= Temple Mount =

Religious site in Jerusalem

- הר הבית الحرم الشريف; Jerusalem's sacred (or holy) esplanade
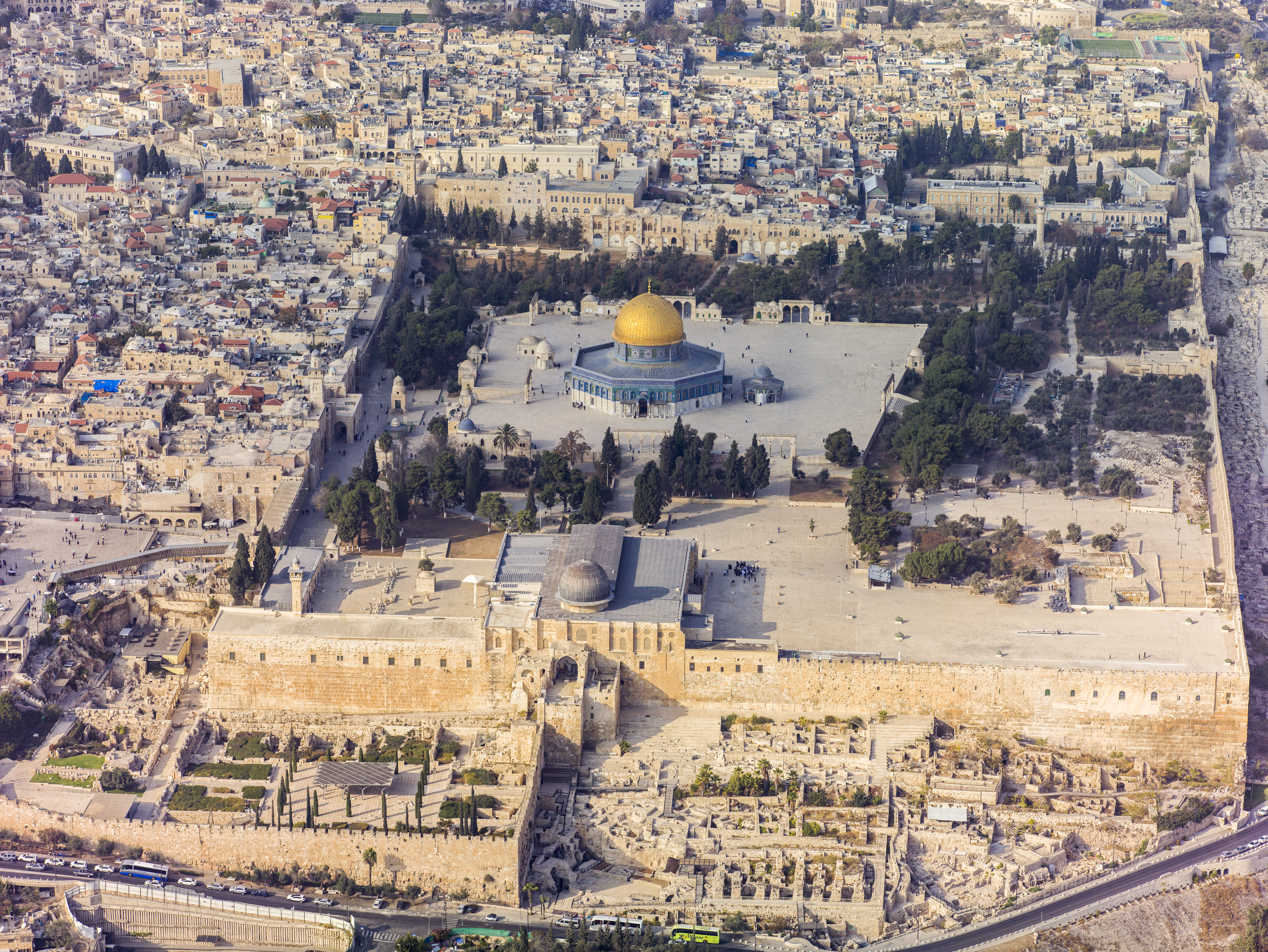
- Aerial view of the Temple Mount

Highest point
- Elevation: 740 m (2,430 ft)
- Coordinates: 31°46′41″N 35°14′9″E

Geography
- Location within Old City of Jerusalem
- Location: Jerusalem
- Parent range: Judean

Geology
- Mountain type: Meleke limestone

The Temple Mount or al-Haram al-Sharif (Biblical Hebrew: הַר הַבַּיִת, romanized: Har hab-Bayiṯ, Arabic: الحَرَم الشَّرِيف, romanized: al-Ḥaram aš-Šarīf or الأَقْصَى, al-Aqṣā) is an elevated plateau in the Old City of Jerusalem that comprises the Islamic religious compound known as al-Aqsa, which includes the al-Aqsa Mosque and the Dome of the Rock. Historically the location of two successive Jewish temples, the area has been venerated as a holy site for thousands of years including in Judaism, Christianity, and Islam.

The present site is a flat plaza surrounded by retaining walls (including the Western Wall), which were originally built by Herod the Great in the first century BCE to expand the Second Temple. The plaza is dominated by two monumental structures originally built during the Rashidun and early Umayyad caliphates after the 637 first Muslim conquest of Jerusalem: the Qibli Mosque of al-Aqsa and the Dome of the Rock, near the center of the hill, which was completed in 692, making it one of the oldest extant Muslim structures in the world. The Herodian walls and gates, with additions from the late Byzantine, early Muslim, Mamluk, and Ottoman periods, flank the site, which can be reached through eleven gates, ten reserved for Muslims and one for non-Muslims, with guard posts of the Israel Police in the vicinity of each. The courtyard is surrounded on the north and west by two Mamluk-era porticos or arcades (arwiqa) and four minarets.

The Temple Mount is the holiest site in Judaism, (Note: To the Jews the Temple Mount is the holiest place on Earth, the place where God manifested himself to King David and where two Jewish temples – Solomon's Temple and the Second Temple – were located.) and where the Temples in Jerusalem once stood. According to Jewish and Samaritan tradition and scriptures, the first Temple was Solomon's Temple, built by King Solomon, the son of King David, in 957 BCE, and was destroyed along with the city itself by the Neo-Babylonian Empire in the siege of Jerusalem, in 587 BCE. No archaeological evidence has been found to verify the existence of the First Temple, and scientific excavations are limited due to religious sensitivities.

The Second Temple, constructed under Zerubbabel in 516 BCE, was later renovated by King Herod and destroyed by the Roman Empire in 70 CE. Judaism maintains it is here that the third and final Temple will be built when the Messiah comes.

Jews face the Temple Mount during prayer. Jewish attitudes towards entering the site vary. Due to its extreme sanctity, many Jews will not walk on the Mount itself to avoid unintentionally entering the area where the Holy of Holies stood, since, according to rabbinical law, there is still some aspect of the divine presence at the site.

In Islam, the Mount is believed to be the second mosque mentioned by the Quran and one of the three Sacred Mosques, the holiest sites in Islam; it is revered as "the Noble Sanctuary". Its courtyard (sahn) can host more than 400,000 worshippers, making it one of the largest mosques in the world.

For Sunni and Shia Muslims alike, it ranks as the third holiest site in Islam. The plaza includes the location regarded as where Muhammad ascended bodily into heaven, and served as the initial qibla, the direction Muslims turn towards when praying. As in Judaism, Muslims also associate the site with Solomon and other prophets also venerated in Islam. The site, and the term "al-Aqsa", in relation to the whole plaza, is also a central identity symbol for Palestinians, including Palestinian Christians.

Since the Crusades, the Muslim community of Jerusalem has managed the site through the Jerusalem Waqf. The site, along with the whole of East Jerusalem (which includes the Old City), was controlled by Jordan from 1948 until 1967 and has been occupied by Israel since the Six-Day War of 1967. Shortly after capturing the site, Israel handed its administration back to the Waqf under the Hashemite (Jordanian) custodianship while maintaining Israeli security control. Israel enforces a ban on prayer by non-Muslims as part of an arrangement usually referred to as the "status quo". The site remains a major focal point of the Israeli–Palestinian conflict.

== Terminology ==
The name of the site is disputed, primarily between Muslims and Jews, in the context of the ongoing Israeli–Palestinian conflict. Some Arab-Muslim commentators and scholars attempt to deny Jewish connection with the Temple Mount, while some Jewish commentators and scholars attempt to belittle the importance of the site in Islam. During a 2016 dispute over the name of the site, UNESCO Director-General Irina Bokova stated: "Different peoples worship the same places, sometimes under different names. The recognition, use of and respect for these names is paramount."

=== Temple Mount ===
The term Har haBayīt – commonly translated as "Temple Mount" in English – was first used in the books of Micah (4:1) and Jeremiah (26:18), literally as "Mount of the House", a literary variation of the longer phrase "Mountain of the House of the Lord". The abbreviation was not used again in the later books of the Hebrew Bible or in the New Testament. The term remained in use throughout the Second Temple period, although the term "Mount Zion", which today refers to the eastern hill of ancient Jerusalem, was used more frequently. Both terms are in use in the Book of Maccabees. The term Har haBayīt is used throughout the Mishnah and later Talmudic texts.

The exact moment when the concept of the Mount as a topographical feature separate from the Temple or the city itself first came into existence is a matter of debate among scholars. According to Eliav, it was during the first century CE, after the destruction of the Second Temple. Shahar and Shatzman reached different conclusions. In the Books of Chronicles, edited at the end of the Persian period, the mountain is already referred to as a distinct entity. In 2 Chronicles, Solomon's Temple was constructed on Mount Moriah (3:1), and Manasseh's atonement for his sins is associated with the Mountain of the House of the Lord (33:15). The conception of the Temple as being located on a holy mountain possessing special qualities is found repeatedly in Psalms, with the surrounding area being considered an integral part of the Temple itself.

The governmental organization which administers the site, the Jerusalem Islamic Waqf (part of the Jordanian government), have stated that the name "The Temple Mount" is a "strange and alien name" and a "newly-created Judaization term". In 2014, the Palestine Liberation Organization (PLO) issued a press release urging journalists not to use the term "Temple Mount" when referring to the site. In 2017, it was reported that Waqf officials harassed archeologists such as Gabriel Barkay and tour guides who used the term at the site. According to Jan Turek and John Carman, in modern usage, the term Temple Mount can potentially imply support for Israeli control of the site.

=== Other Hebrew terms ===
2 Chronicles 3:1 refers to the Temple Mount in the time before the construction of the temple as Mount Moriah (Hebrew: הַר הַמֹּורִיָּה, har ha-Môriyyāh).

Several passages in the Hebrew Bible indicate that during the time when they were written, the Temple Mount was identified as Mount Zion. The Mount Zion mentioned in the later parts of the Book of Isaiah (Isaiah 60:14), in the Book of Psalms, and the First Book of Maccabees (c. 2nd century BCE) seems to refer to the top of the hill, generally known as the Temple Mount. According to the Book of Samuel, Mount Zion was the site of the Jebusite fortress called the "stronghold of Zion", but once the First Temple was erected, according to the Bible, at the top of the Eastern Hill ("Temple Mount"), the name "Mount Zion" migrated there too. The name later migrated for a last time, this time to Jerusalem's Western Hill.

=== Al-Aqsa Mosque ===
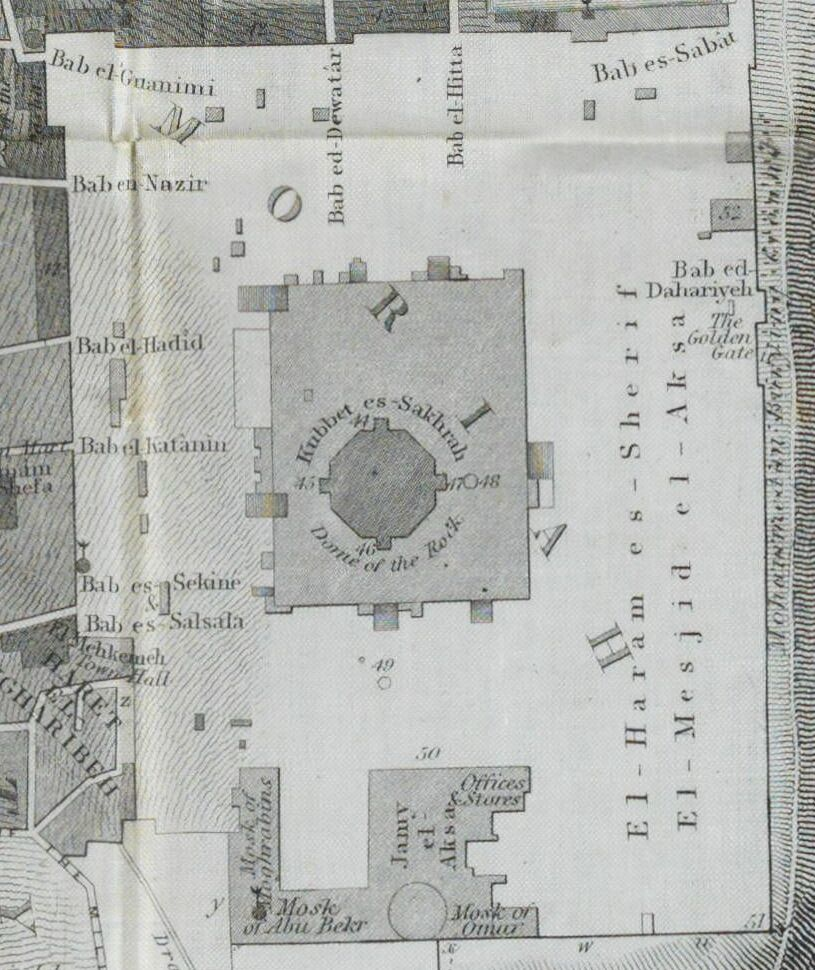
Extract of an 1841 British map showing both "Mesjid el-Aksa" and "Jami el-Aksa"

The English term "al-Aqsa Mosque" is a translation of either al-Masjid al-'Aqṣā (Arabic: ٱلْمَسْجِد ٱلْأَقْصَىٰ) or al-Jâmi' al-Aqṣā (Arabic: ٱلْـجَـامِـع الْأَقْـصّى). Al-Masjid al-'Aqṣā – "the farthest mosque" – is derived from the Quran's Surah 17 ("The Night Journey") which writes that Muhammad travelled from Mecca to the mosque, from where he subsequently ascended to Heaven. Arabic and Persian writers such as 10th-century geographer Al-Maqdisi, 11th-century scholar Nasir Khusraw, 12th-century geographer Muhammad al-Idrisi and 15th-century Islamic scholar Mujir al-Din, as well as 19th century American and British Orientalists Edward Robinson, Guy Le Strange and Edward Henry Palmer explained that the term Masjid al-Aqsa refers to the entire esplanade plaza which is the subject of this article – the entire area including the Dome of the Rock, the fountains, the gates, and the four minarets – because none of these buildings existed at the time the Quran was written.

Al-Jâmi' al-Aqṣá refers to the specific site of the silver-domed congregational mosque building, also referred to as Qibli Mosque or Qibli Chapel (al-Jami' al-Aqsa or al-Qibli, or Masjid al-Jumah or al-Mughata), in reference to its location on the southern end of the compound as a result of the Islamic qibla being moved from Jerusalem to Mecca. The two different Arabic terms, translated as "mosque" in English, parallel the two different Greek terms translated as "temple" in the New Testament: Greek: ίερόν, romanized: hieron (equivalent to Masjid) and Greek: ναός, romanized: naos (equivalent to Jami'a), and use of the term "mosque" for the whole compound follows the usage of the same term for other early Islamic sites with large courtyards such as the Mosque of Ibn Tulun in Cairo, the Umayyad Mosque in Damascus and the Great Mosque of Kairouan. Other sources and maps have used the term al-Masjid al-'Aqṣā to refer to the congregational mosque itself.

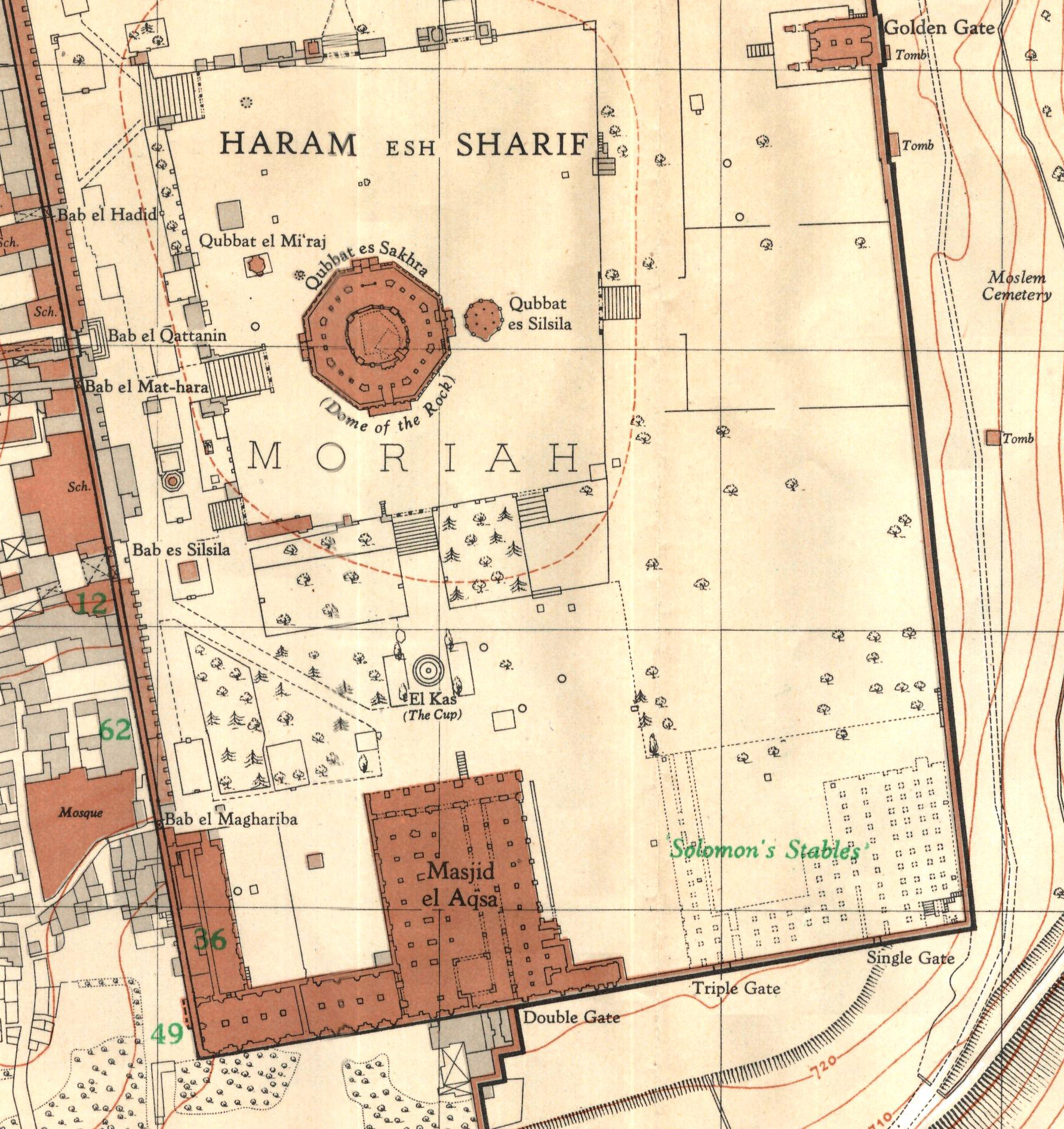
Extract of a 1936 British map showing the entire site as "Moriah" or "Haram esh-Sharif"; the Al-Aqsa Mosque shown as "Mesjid el-Aksa"

The term "al-Aqsa" as a symbol and brand-name has become popular and prevalent in the region. For example, the Al-Aqsa Intifada (the uprising of September 2000), the al-Aqsa Martyrs' Brigades (a coalition of Palestinian nationalist militias in the West Bank), al-Aqsa TV (the official Hamas-run television channel), al-Aqsa University (Palestinian university established in 1991 in the Gaza Strip), Jund al-Aqsa (a Salafist jihadist organization that was active during the Syrian Civil War), the Jordanian military periodical published since the early 1970s, and the associations of both the southern and northern branches of the Islamic Movement in Israel are all named Al-Aqsa after this site.

=== al-Haram ash-Sharif ===
During the period of Mamluk (1260–1517) and Ottoman rule (1517–1917), the wider compound of the Temple Mount began to also be popularly known as the Haram al-Sharif, or الحَرَم الشَّرِيف, al-ḥaram aš-šharīf, which translates as the 'Noble Sanctuary,' or الحَرَم القُدْسِي الشَّرِيف, al-ḥaram al-qudsī aš-šharīf, the 'Noble Jerusalem/Holy Sanctuary.' The Arabic word ḥaram (حَرَم)—related to but distinct from the word ḥarām (حَرام)—is used to refer to a campus or a compound, especially of a mosque, as in ḥaram jāmiʿī (حَرَم جَامِعيّ).

It mirrors the terminology of the Masjid al-Haram in Mecca; This term elevated the compound to the status of Haram, which had previously been reserved for the Masjid al-Haram in Mecca, and the Al-Masjid an-Nabawi in Medina. Other Islamic figures disputed the haram status of the site. Usage of the name Haram al-Sharif by local Palestinians has waned in recent decades, in favor of the traditional name of Al-Aqsa Mosque.

=== Jerusalem's sacred esplanade ===
Some scholars have used the terms Sacred Esplanade or Holy Esplanade as a "strictly neutral term" for the site. A notable example of this usage is the 2009 work Where Heaven and Earth Meet: Jerusalem's Sacred Esplanade, written as a joint undertaking by 21 Jewish, Muslim and Christian scholars.

=== Jerusalem's Holy Esplanade ===
In recent years, the term "Holy Esplanade" has been used by the United Nations, by its Secretary-General and by the UN's subsidiary organs.

== Location and dimensions ==
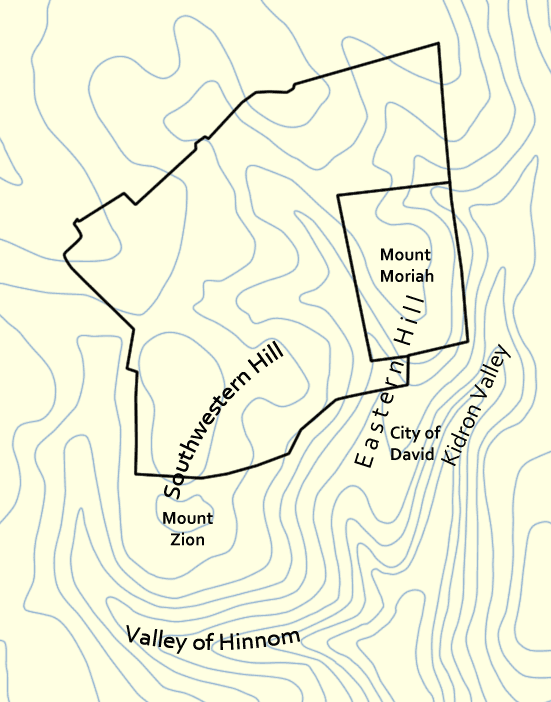
Topographical map of Jerusalem, showing the Temple Mount on the eastern peak

The Temple Mount forms the northern portion of a narrow spur of hill that slopes sharply downward from north to south. Rising above the Kidron Valley to the east and Tyropoeon Valley to the west, its peak reaches a height of 740 m (2,428 ft) above sea level. In around 19 BCE, Herod the Great extended the Mount's natural plateau by enclosing the area with four massive retaining walls and filling the voids. This artificial expansion resulted in a large flat expanse which today forms the eastern section of the Old City of Jerusalem. The trapezium shaped platform measures 488 m (1,601 ft) along the west, 470 m (1,540 ft) along the east, 315 m (1,033 ft) along the north and 280 m (920 ft) along the south, giving a total area of approximately 150,000 m^{2} (37 acres). The northern wall of the Mount, together with the northern section of the western wall, is hidden behind residential buildings. The southern section of the western flank is revealed and contains what is known as the Western Wall. The retaining walls on these two sides descend many meters below ground level. A northern portion of the western wall may be seen from within the Western Wall Tunnel, which was excavated through buildings adjacent to the platform. On the southern and eastern sides, the walls are visible almost to their full height. The platform itself is separated from the rest of the Old City by the Tyropoeon Valley, though this once deep valley is now largely hidden beneath later deposits and is imperceptible in places. The platform can be reached via Gate of the Chain Street – a street in the Muslim Quarter at the level of the platform, actually sitting on a monumental bridge; the bridge is no longer externally visible due to the change in ground level, but it can be seen from beneath via the Western Wall Tunnel.

== Heritage site ==
In 1980, Jordan proposed that the Old City be listed as a UNESCO World Heritage Site and it was added to the List in 1981. In 1982, it was added to the List of World Heritage in Danger.

On 26 October 2016, UNESCO passed the Occupied Palestine Resolution that condemned what it described as "escalating Israeli aggressions" and illegal measures against the waqf, called for the restoration of Muslim access and demanded that Israel respect the historical status quo and also criticized Israel for its continuous "refusal to let the body's experts access Jerusalem's holy sites to determine their conservation status". While the text acknowledged the "importance of the Old City of Jerusalem and its walls for the three monotheistic religions", it referred to the sacred hilltop compound in Jerusalem's Old City only by its Muslim name Al-Haram al-Sharif.

In response, Israel denounced the UNESCO resolution for its omission of the words "Temple Mount" or "Har HaBayit", stating that it denied Jewish ties to the site. Israel froze all ties with UNESCO. In October 2017, Israel and the United States announced they would withdraw from UNESCO, citing anti-Israel bias.

On 6 April 2022, UNESCO unanimously adopted a resolution reiterating all 21 previous resolutions concerned with Jerusalem.

== Religious significance ==
The Temple Mount has historical and religious significance for all three of the major Abrahamic religions: Judaism, Christianity and Islam. It has particular religious significance for Judaism and Islam.

=== Judaism ===
The Temple Mount is considered the holiest site in Judaism. According to Jewish tradition, both Temples stood at the Temple Mount. Jewish tradition further places the Temple Mount as the location for a number of important events which occurred in the Bible, including the Binding of Isaac, Jacob's dream, and the prayer of Isaac and Rebekah. According to the Talmud, the Foundation Stone is the place from where the world was created and expanded into its current form. Orthodox Jewish tradition maintains it is here that the third and final Temple will be built when the Messiah comes.

The Temple Mount is the place Jews turn towards during prayer. Jewish attitudes towards entering the site vary. Due to its extreme sanctity, many Jews will not walk on the Mount itself, to avoid unintentionally entering the area where the Holy of Holies stood, since, according to rabbinical law, there is still some aspect of the divine presence at the site.

==== The Temple ====
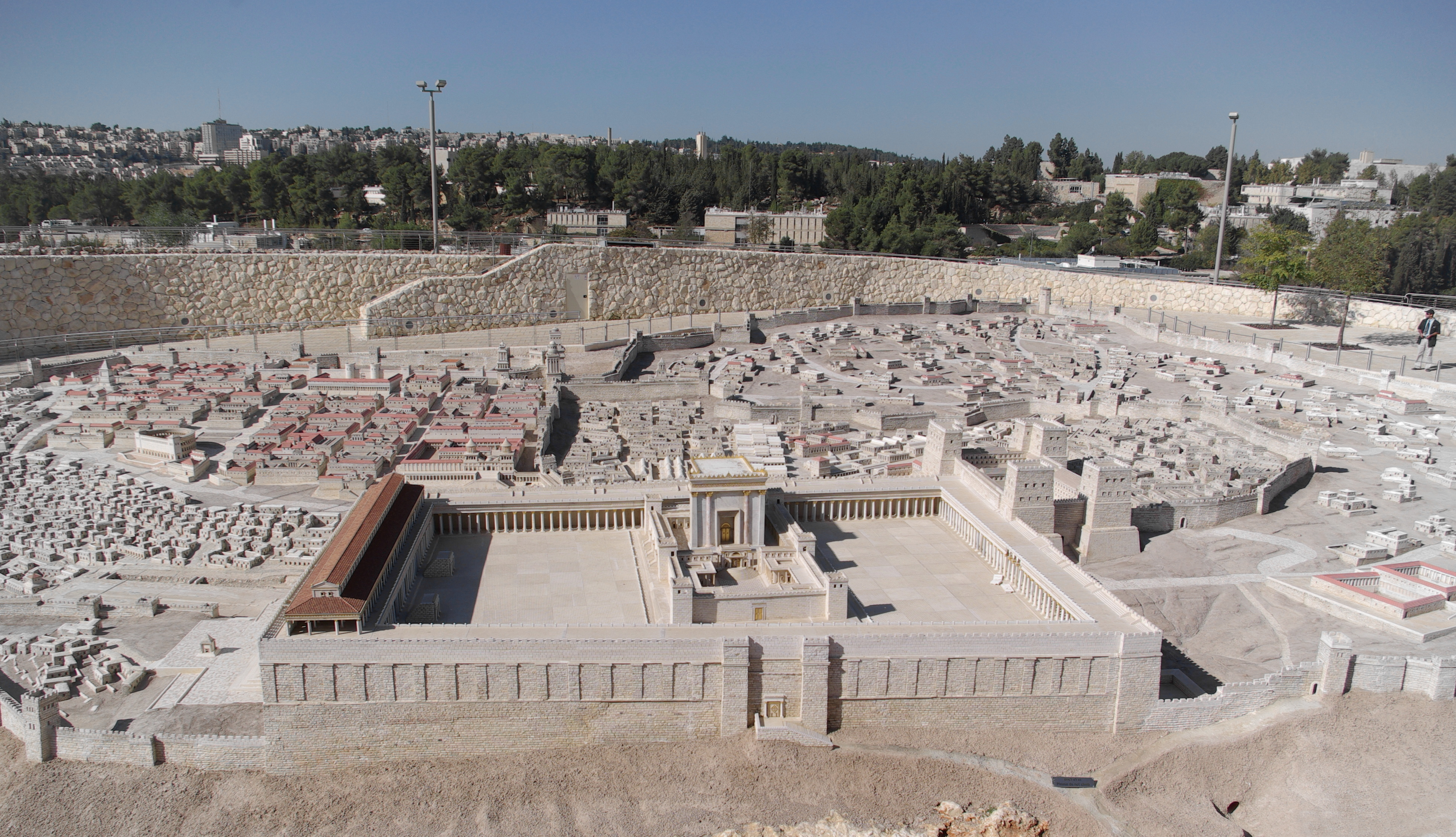
The Holyland Model of Jerusalem depicts Jerusalem during the late Second Temple period. The Temple Mount and Herod's Temple are shown in the middle. View from the east.

According to the Hebrew Bible, the Temple Mount was originally a threshing-floor owned by Araunah, a Jebusite. The Bible narrates how David united the twelve Israelite tribes, conquered Jerusalem and brought the Israelites' central artifact, the Ark of the Covenant, into the city. When a great plague struck Israel, a destroying angel appeared on Araunah's threshing floor. The prophet Gad then suggested the area to David as a fitting place for the erection of an altar to Yahweh. David bought the property from Araunah, for fifty pieces of silver, and erected the altar. God answered his prayers and stopped the plague. David subsequently chose the site for a future temple to replace the Tabernacle and house the Ark of the Covenant; God forbade him from building it, however, because he had "shed much blood".

The First Temple was instead constructed under David's son Solomon, who became an ambitious builder of public works in ancient Israel:

Then Solomon began to build the house of the LORD at Jerusalem in Mount Moriah, where [the LORD] appeared unto David his father; for which provision had been made in the Place of David, in the threshing floor of Ornan the Jebusite.

— 2 Chronicles 3:1

Solomon placed the Ark in the Holy of Holies – the windowless innermost sanctuary and most sacred area of the temple in which God's presence rested; entry into the Holy of Holies was heavily restricted, and only the High Priest of Israel entered the sanctuary once per year on Yom Kippur, carrying the blood of a sacrificial lamb and burning incense. According to the Bible, the site functioned as the center of all national life – a governmental, judicial and religious center.

The Genesis Rabba, which was probably written between 300 and 500 CE, states that this site is one of three about which the nations of the world cannot taunt Israel and say, "you have stolen them," since it was purchased "for its full price" by David.

The First Temple was destroyed in 587/586 BCE by the Neo-Babylonian Empire under the second Babylonian king, Nebuchadnezzar II, who subsequently exiled the Judeans to Babylon following the fall of the Kingdom of Judah and its annexation as a Babylonian province. The Jews who had been deported in the aftermath of the Babylonian conquest of Judah were eventually allowed to return following a proclamation by the Persian king Cyrus the Great that was issued after the fall of Babylon to the Achaemenid Empire. In 516 BCE, the returned Jewish population in Judah, under Persian provincial governance, rebuilt the Temple in Jerusalem under the auspices of Zerubbabel, producing what is known as the Second Temple.

During the Second Temple Period, Jerusalem was the center of religious and national life for Jews, including those in the Diaspora. The Second Temple is believed to have attracted tens and maybe hundreds of thousands during the Three Pilgrimage Festivals. The holiday of Hanukkah commemorates the rededication of the Temple at the beginning of the Maccabean revolt in the 2nd century BCE. During the first century BCE, the Temple was renovated by Herod. It was destroyed by the Roman Empire at the height of the First Jewish-Roman War in 70 CE. Tisha B'Av, an annual fast day in Judaism, marks the destruction of the First and Second Temples, which according to Jewish tradition, occurred on the same day on the Hebrew calendar.

==== In prophecy ====
The Book of Isaiah foretells the international importance of the Temple Mount:

And it shall come to pass in the end of days, that the mountain of the LORD'S house shall be established as the top of the mountains, and shall be exalted above the hills; and all nations shall flow unto it. And many peoples shall go and say: 'Come ye, and let us go up to the mountain of the LORD, to the house of the God of Jacob; and He will teach us of His ways, and we will walk in His paths.' For out of Zion shall go forth the law, and the word of the LORD from Jerusalem.

— Isaiah 2:2–3

==== Binding of Isaac ====
In Jewish tradition, the Temple Mount is also believed to be the location of Abraham's binding of Isaac. 2 Chronicles 3:1 refers to the Temple Mount in the time before the construction of the temple as Mount Moriah (Hebrew: הַר הַמֹּורִיָּה, har ha-Môriyyā). The "land of Moriah" (אֶרֶץ הַמֹּרִיָּה, ereṣ ha-Môriyyā) is the name given by Genesis to the location of the binding of Isaac. Since at least the first century CE, the two sites have been identified with one another in Judaism, this identification being subsequently perpetuated by Jewish and Christian tradition. Modern scholarship tends to regard them as distinct (see Moriah).

==== Creation of the world ====
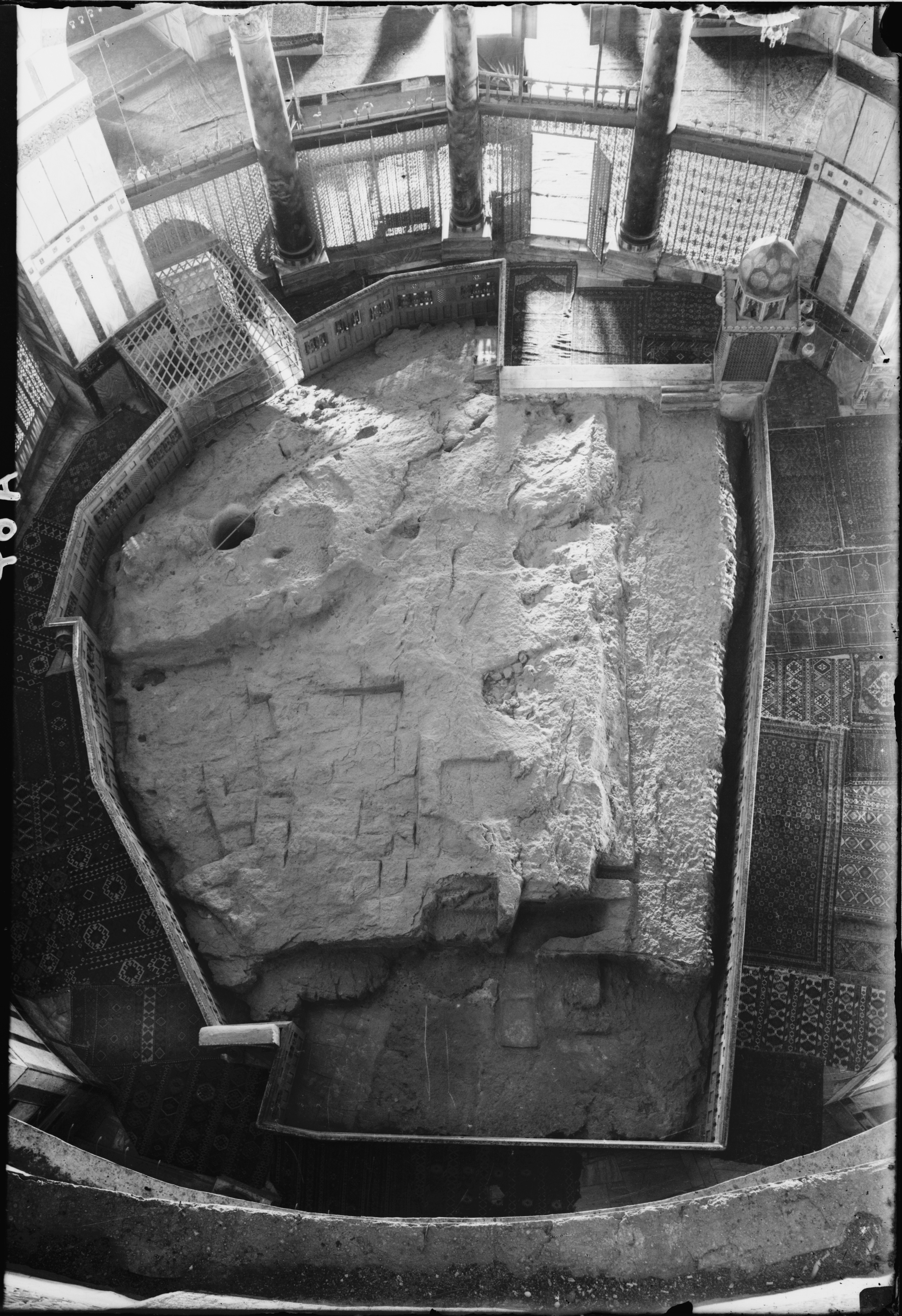
Picture showing what is presumed to be the Foundation Stone, or a large part of it

According to the rabbinic sages whose debates produced the Talmud, the Foundation Stone, which sits below the Dome of the Rock, was the spot from where the world was created and expanded into its current form, and where God gathered the dust used to create the first human, Adam.

==== Third Temple ====
Jewish texts predict that the Mount will be the site of a Third and final Temple, which will be rebuilt with the coming of the Messiah. The rebuilding of the Temple remained a recurring theme among generations, particularly in thrice daily Amidah (Standing prayer), central prayer of the Jewish liturgy, which contains a plea for the building of a Third Temple and the restoration of sacrificial services.

A few very small Jewish groups today support constructing a Third Temple, but most Jews oppose this, both due to the enormously hostile reaction from Palestinians and Arab nations that would likely result, and because according to the Talmud and traditional halakha, the reconstruction of the Temple and accession to the sacred precinct carry severe ritual impurity restrictions, with many authorities arguing the rebuilding awaits the messianic era rather than human agency. Furthermore, reconstruction would require the reinstitution of ancient sacrificial rites (korbanot), a prospect that lacks widespread support across modern streams of Judaism. Some groups even advocate building the Third Temple without delay in order to bring to pass God's "end-time prophetic plans for Israel and the entire world."

Some fundamentalist and evangelical Christian groups, particularly those adhering to dispensational premillennialism, believe that the Jewish people will construct a Third Temple on the Temple Mount as an essential precursor to the Great Tribulation, occurring either shortly before or after the rapture of the Christian church. This eschatological framework relies on interpretations of Daniel 9:27, Matthew 24:15, and 2 Thessalonians 2:3–4, which dispensationalist authors interpret as requiring a physical temple in Jerusalem where the Antichrist will commit the "abomination of desolation" before the Second Coming of Jesus. As a result, several American evangelical organizations actively provide financial and political support to Israeli Temple activist organizations, anticipating that rebuilding the sanctuary will accelerate the biblical end times.

=== Christianity ===
The Temple was of central importance in Jewish worship in the Tanakh (Old Testament). In the New Testament, Herod's Temple was the site of several events in the life of Jesus, and Christian loyalty to the site as a focal point remained long after his death. After the destruction of the Temple in 70 CE, which came to be regarded by early Christians, as it was by Josephus and the sages of the Jerusalem Talmud, to be a divine act of punishment for the sins of the Jewish people, the Temple Mount lost its significance for Christian worship with the Christians considering it a fulfillment of Christ's prophecy at, for example, Matthew 23:38 and Matthew 24:2. It was to this end, proof of a biblical prophecy fulfilled and of Christianity's victory over Judaism with the New Covenant, that early Christian pilgrims also visited the site. Byzantine Christians, despite some signs of constructive work on the esplanade, generally neglected the Temple Mount, especially when a Jewish attempt to rebuild the Temple was destroyed by the earthquake of 363. It became a desolate local rubbish dump, perhaps outside the city limits, as Christian worship in Jerusalem shifted to the Church of the Holy Sepulchre, and Jerusalem's centrality was replaced by Rome.

During the Byzantine era, Jerusalem was primarily Christian and pilgrims came by the tens of thousands to experience the places where Jesus walked. After the Persian invasion in 614 many churches were razed, and the site was turned into a dump. The Arabs conquered the city from the Byzantine Empire which had retaken it in 629. The Byzantine ban on the Jews was lifted and they were allowed to live inside the city and visit the places of worship. Christian pilgrims were able to come and experience the Temple Mount area. The war between Seljuqs and Byzantine Empire and increasing Muslim violence against Christian pilgrims to Jerusalem instigated the Crusades. The Crusaders captured Jerusalem in 1099 and the Dome of the Rock was given to the Augustinians, who turned it into a church, and al-Aqsa Mosque became the royal palace of Baldwin I of Jerusalem in 1104. The Knights Templar, who believed the Dome of the Rock was the site of Solomon's Temple, gave it the name "Templum Domini" and set up their headquarters in al-Aqsa Mosque adjacent to the Dome for much of the 12th century.

In Christian art, the circumcision of Jesus was conventionally depicted as taking place at the Temple, even though European artists until recently had no way of knowing what the Temple looked like and the Gospels do not state that the event took place at the Temple.

Though some Christians believe that the Temple will be reconstructed before, or concurrent with, the Second Coming of Jesus (also see dispensationalism), pilgrimage to the Temple Mount is not viewed as important in the beliefs and worship of most Christians. The New Testament recounts a story of a Samaritan woman asking Jesus about the appropriate place to worship, Jerusalem (as it was for the Jews) or Mount Gerizim (as it was for the Samaritans), to which Jesus replies:

Woman, believe me, the hour is coming when neither on this mountain nor in Jerusalem will you worship the Father. You worship what you do not know; we worship what we know, for salvation is from the Jews. But the hour is coming, and is now here, when the true worshipers will worship the Father in spirit and in truth, for the Father is seeking such people to worship him. God is spirit, and those who worship him must worship in spirit and truth.

— John 4:21–24

This has been construed to mean that Jesus dispensed with physical location for worship, which was a matter rather of spirit and truth.

=== Islam ===
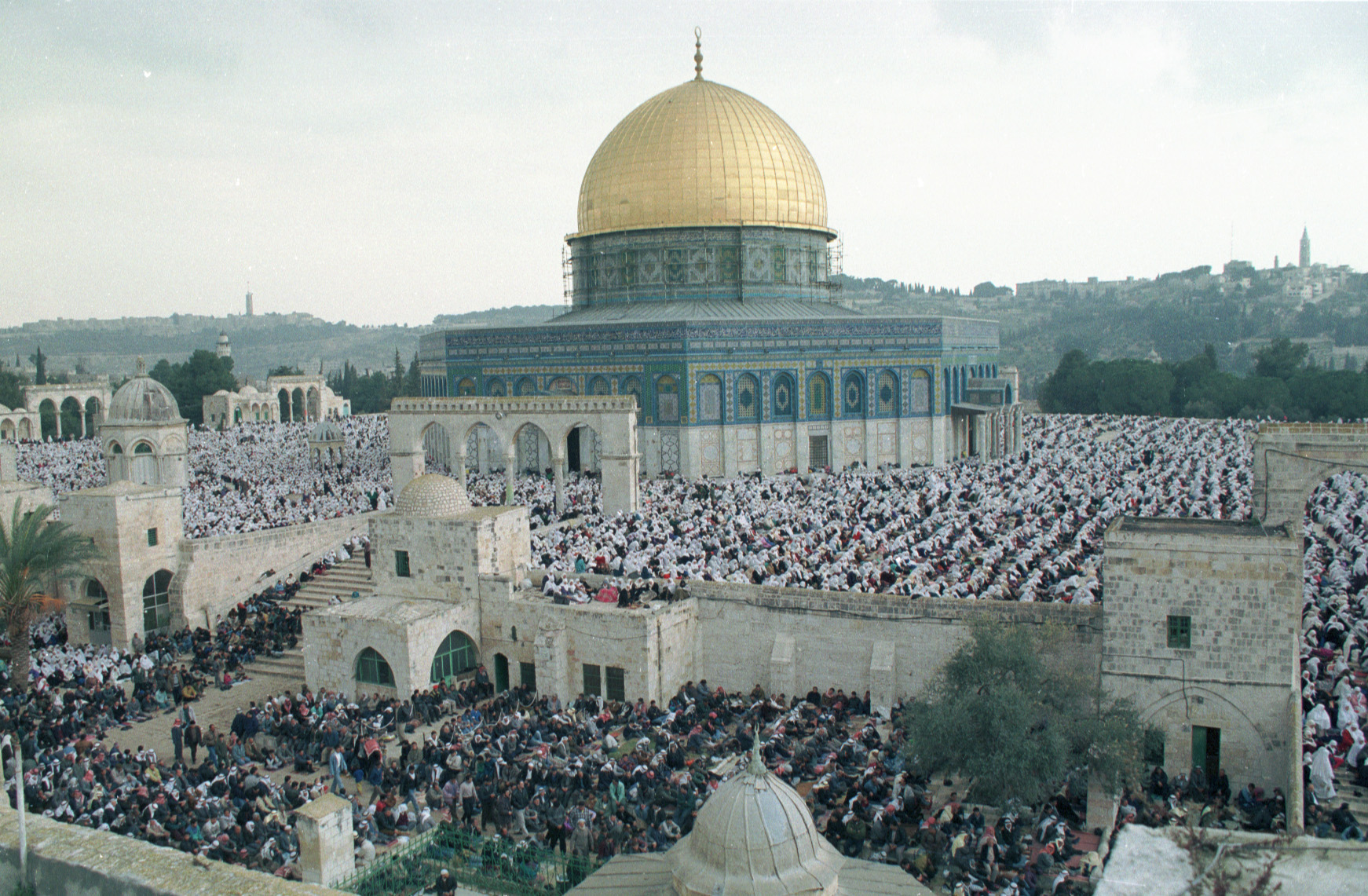
c.300,000 Muslims praying at Ramadan, 1996

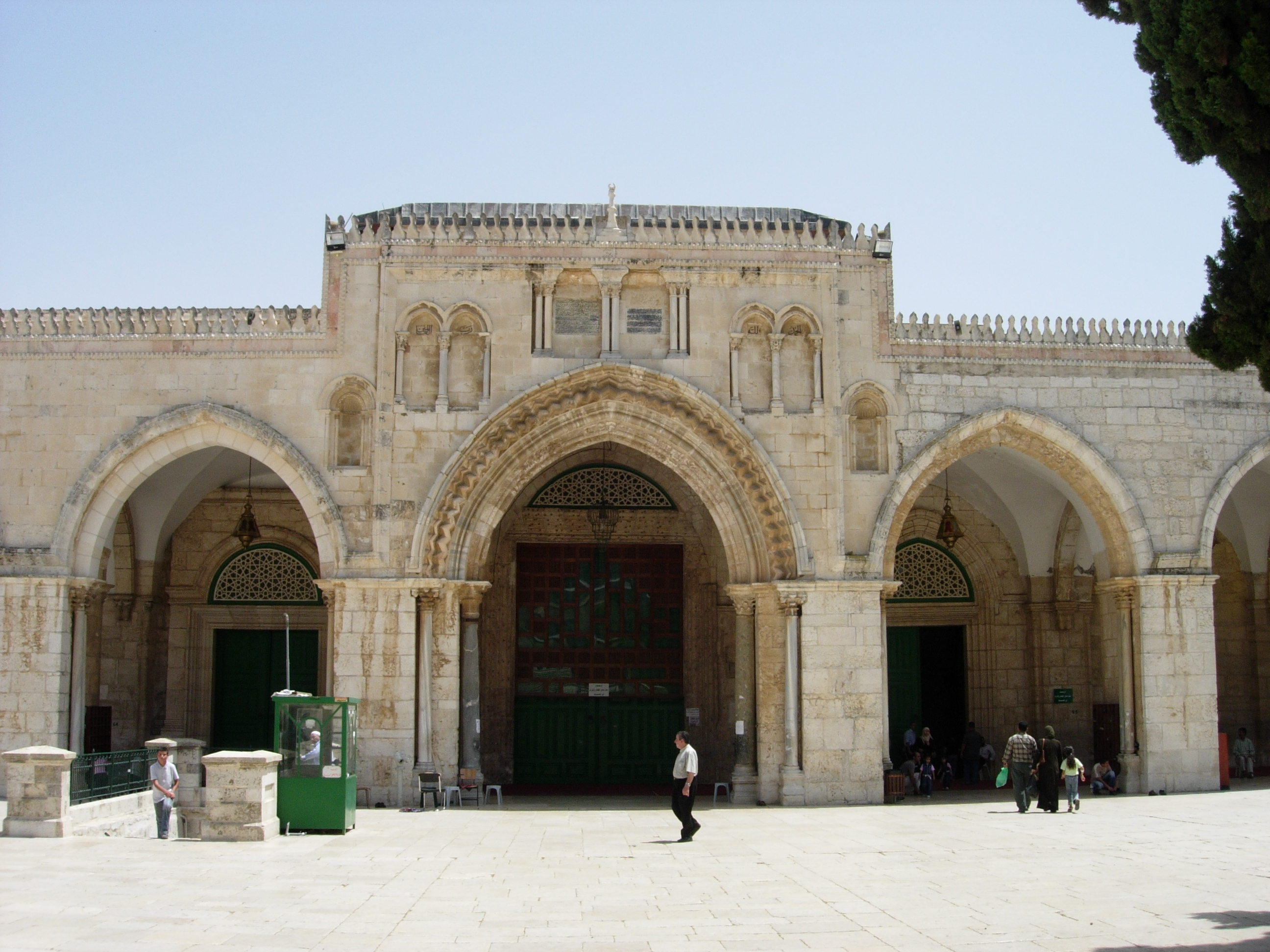
Façade of al-Aqsa's main praying hall, the Qibli Mosque, viewed from the north

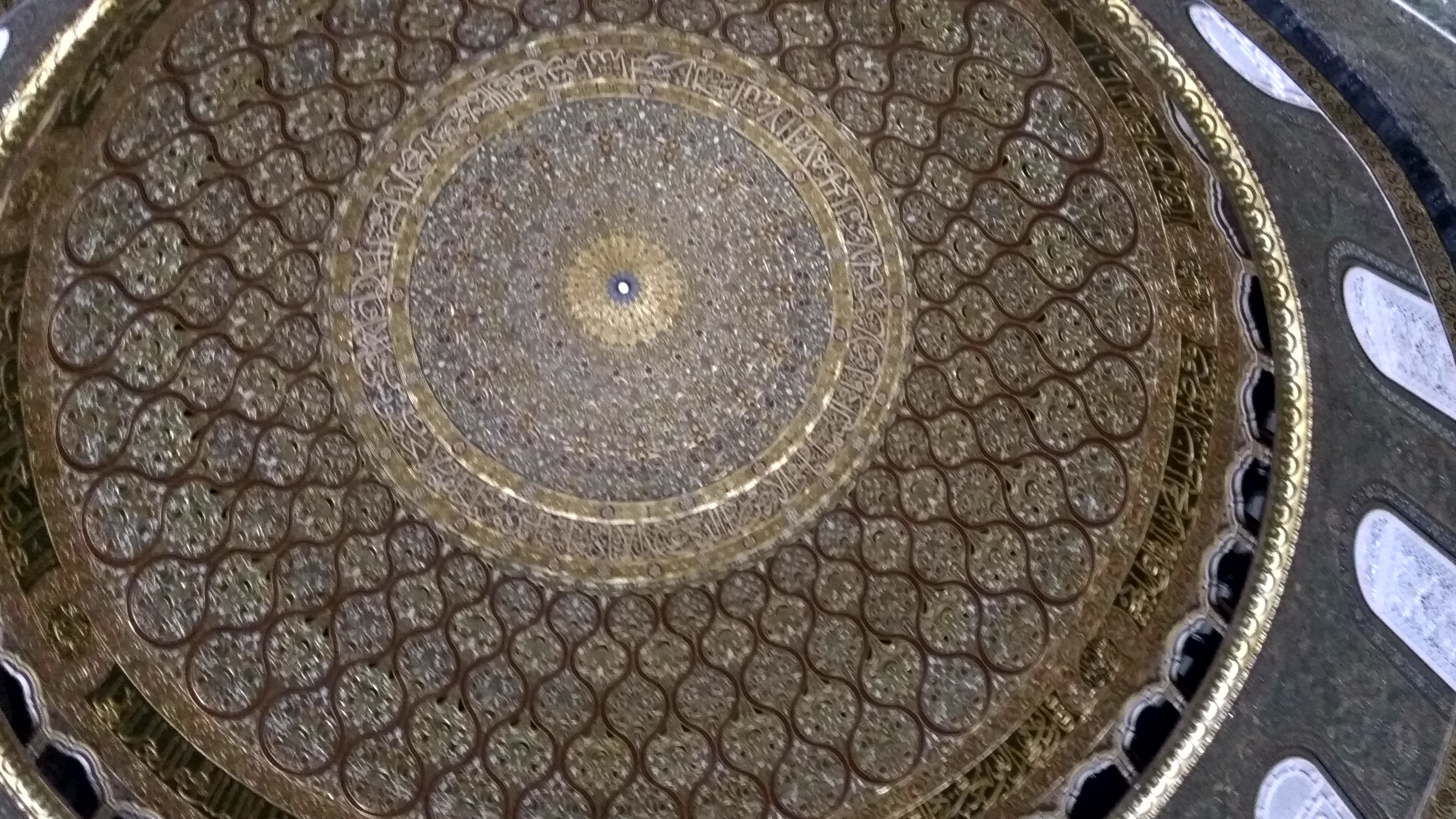
Interior decoration of the Dome of the Rock

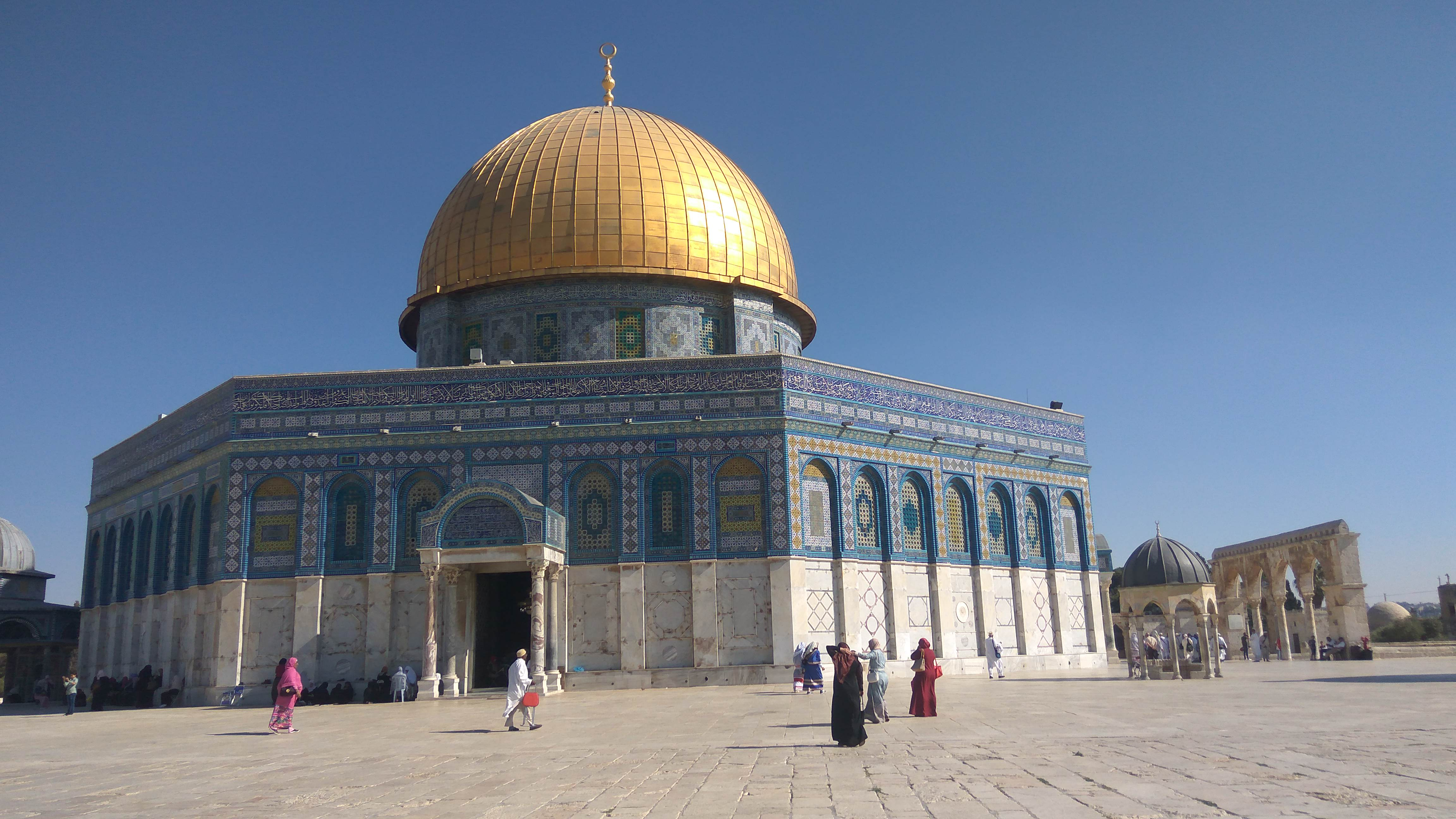
The Dome of the Rock as an Islamic shrine, as seen from the north

Among both Sunni and Shia Muslims, the entire plaza, known as the al-Aqsa Mosque, also known as Haram al-Sharif or "the Noble Sanctuary", is considered the third holiest site in Islam. According to Islamic tradition, the plaza is the location of Muhammad's ascension to heaven from Jerusalem, and served as the first "qibla", the direction Muslims turn towards when praying. As in Judaism, Muslims also associate the site with Abraham, and other prophets who are also venerated in Islam. Muslims view the site as being one of the earliest and most noteworthy places of worship of God. They preferred to use the esplanade as the heart for the Muslim quarter, since it had been abandoned by Christians, to avoid disturbing the Christian quarters of Jerusalem. Umayyad Caliphs commissioned the construction of al-Aqsa Mosque on the site, including the shrine known as the "Dome of the Rock". The Dome was completed in 692 CE, making it one of the oldest extant Islamic structures in the world. The Al-Aqsa Mosque, sometimes known as the Qibli Mosque, rest on the far southern side of the Mount, facing Mecca.

==== In early Islam ====
Early Islam regarded the Foundation Stone as the location of Solomon's Temple, and the first architectural initiatives on the Temple Mount sought to glorify Jerusalem by presenting Islam as a continuation of Judaism and Christianity. Almost immediately after the Muslim conquest of Jerusalem in 638 CE, Caliph 'Omar ibn al Khatab, reportedly disgusted by the filth covering the site, had it thoroughly cleaned, and granted Jews access to the site. According to early Quranic interpreters and what is generally accepted as Islamic tradition, in 638 CE Umar, upon entering a conquered Jerusalem, consulted with Ka'ab al-Ahbar – a Jewish convert to Islam who came with him from Medina – as to where the best spot would be to build a mosque. Al-Ahbar suggested to him that it should be behind the Rock "... so that all of Jerusalem would be before you." Umar replied, "You correspond to Judaism!" Immediately after this conversation, Umar began to clean up the site – which was filled with trash and debris – with his cloak, and other Muslim followers imitated him until the site was clean. Umar then prayed at the spot where it was believed that Muhammad had prayed before his night journey, reciting the Quranic sura Sad. Thus, according to this tradition, Umar thereby reconsecrated the site as a mosque.

Muslim interpretations of the Quran agree that the Mount is the site of the Temple originally built by Solomon, considered a prophet in Islam, that was later destroyed. After the construction, Muslims believe, the temple was used for the worship of the one God by many prophets of Islam, including Jesus. Other Muslim scholars have used the Torah (called Tawrat in Arabic) to expand on the details of the temple. The term Bayt al-Maqdis (or Bayt al-Muqaddas), which frequently appears as a name of Jerusalem in early Islamic sources, is a cognate of the Hebrew term bēt ha-miqdāsh (בית המקדש), the Temple in Jerusalem. Mujir al-Din, a 15th-century Jerusalemite chronicler, mentions an earlier tradition related by al-Wasti, according which "after David built many cities and the situation of the children of Israel was improved, he wanted to construct Bayt al-Maqdis and build a dome over the rock in the place that Allah sanctified in Aelia."

==== Isra and Mi'raj ====
According to the Qur'an, Muhammad was transported to a site named Al-Aqsa Mosque – "the furthest place of prayer" (al-Masjid al-'Aqṣā) during his Night Journey (Isra and Mi'raj). The Qur'an describes how Muhammad was taken by the miraculous steed Buraq from the Great Mosque of Mecca to al-Aqsa Mosque where he prayed. After Muhammad finished his prayers, the angel Jibril (Gabriel) traveled with him to heaven, where he met several other prophets and led them in prayer:

Glory be to the One Who took His servant ˹Muḥammad˺ by night from the Sacred Mosque to the Farthest Mosque whose surroundings We have blessed, so that We may show him some of Our signs. Indeed, He alone is the All-Hearing, All-Seeing.

— Surah Al-Isra 17:1

The Qur'an does not mention the exact location of "the furthest place of prayer", and the city of Jerusalem is not mentioned by any of its names in the Qur'an. According to the Encyclopaedia of Islam, the phrase was originally understood as a reference to a site in the heavens. A group of Islamic scholars understood the story of Muhammad's ascension from al-Aqsa Mosque as relating to the Jewish Temple in Jerusalem. Another group disagreed with this identification and preferred the meaning of the term as referring to heaven. Al-Bukhari and Al-Tabari, for example, are believed to have rejected the identification with Jerusalem. Eventually, a consensus emerged around the identification of the "furthest place of prayer" with Jerusalem, and by implication the Temple Mount. Later hadiths referred to Jerusalem as the site of the Al-Aqsa Mosque:

Narrated Jabir bin `Abdullah:
That he heard Allah's Messenger saying, "When the people of Quraish did not believe me (i.e. the story of my Night Journey), I stood up in Al-Hijr and Allah displayed Jerusalem in front of me, and I began describing it to them while I was looking at it."

— Sahih al-Bukhari 3886

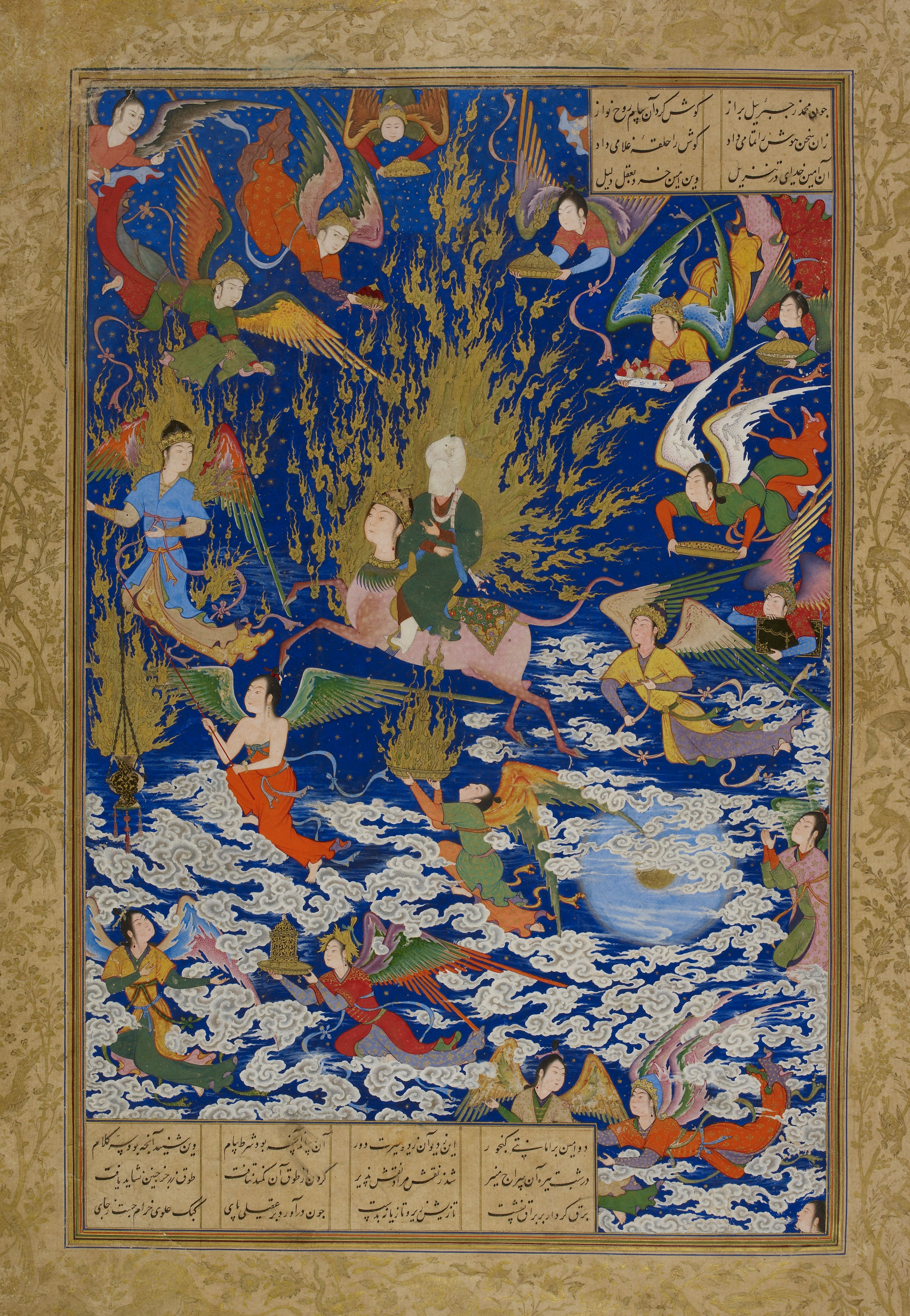
A depiction of Muhammad's ascent to heaven by Sultan Mohammed

Some scholars point to the political motives of the Umayyad dynasty which led to the sanctification of Jerusalem in Islam. According to the Encyclopaedia of Islam, the Night Journey was associated with Jerusalem by the Umayyads as a political means to advance the glory of Jerusalem to compete with the glory of the sanctuary in Mecca then controlled by Abd Allah ibn al-Zubayr. The construction of the Dome of the Rock was interpreted by Ya'qubi, a 9th-century Abbasid historian, as an Umayyad attempt to redirect the Hajj from Mecca to Jerusalem by creating a rival to the Ka'aba.

Other academics attribute the holiness of Jerusalem to the rise and expansion of a certain type of literary genre, known as al-Fadhail or history of cities. The Fadhail of Jerusalem inspired Muslims, especially during the Umayyad period, to embellish the sanctity of the city beyond its status in the holy texts. Based on the writings of the eighth century historians Al-Waqidi and al-Azraqi, some scholars have suggested that al-Aqsa Mosque mentioned in the Qur'an is not in Jerusalem but in the village of al-Ju'ranah, 18 miles northeast of Mecca.

Later medieval scripts, as well as modern-day political tracts, tend to classify al-Aqsa Mosque as the third holiest site in Islam.

==== First qibla ====
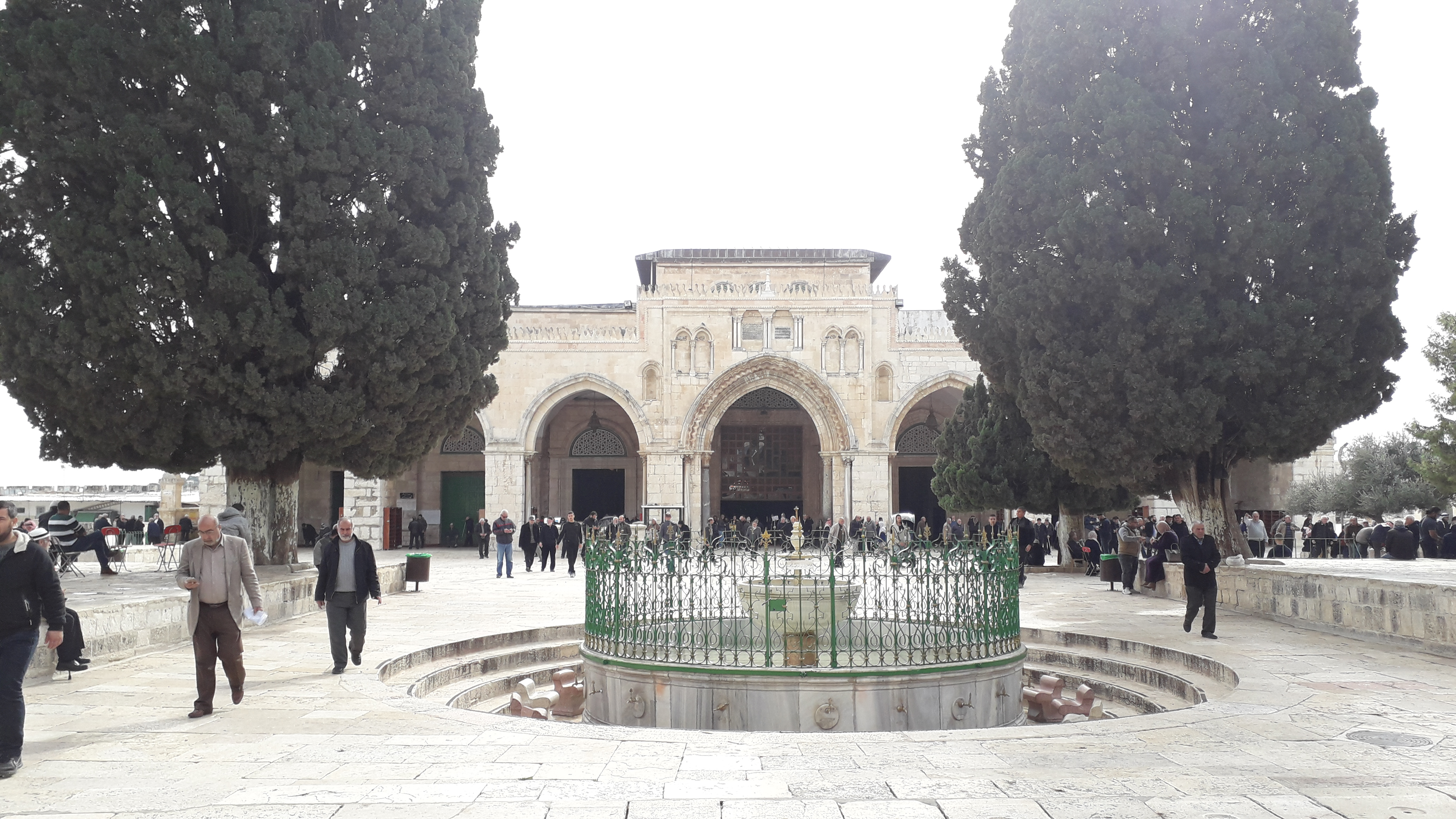
Al-Aqsa Mosque in 2019

The historical significance of al-Aqsa Mosque in Islam is further emphasized by the fact that Muslims turned towards al-Aqsa when they prayed for a period of 16 or 17 months after migration to Medina in 624; it thus became the qibla ("direction") that Muslims faced for prayer. Muhammad later prayed towards the Kaaba in Mecca after receiving a revelation during a prayer session in the Masjid al-Qiblatayn. The qibla was relocated to the Kaaba where Muslims have been directed to pray ever since.

==== Religious status ====
The Organisation of Islamic Cooperation refers to al-Aqsa Mosque as the third holiest site in Islam (and calls for Arab sovereignty over it).

== History ==
=== Pre-Israelite ===
The hill is believed to have been inhabited since the 4th millennium BCE. An amulet bearing the cartouche of Thutmose III (r. 1479–1425 BCE) was discovered by the Temple Mount Sifting Project at the site in 2012.

=== Israelite period ===
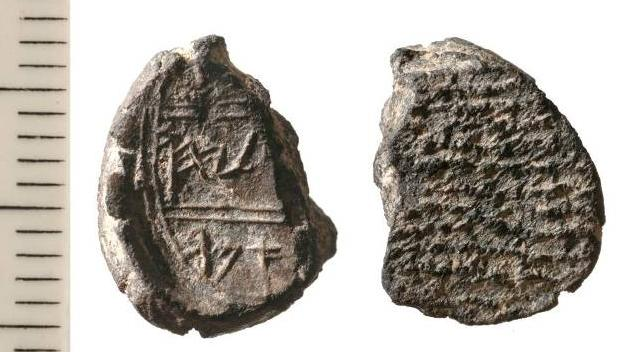
The Immer Bulla (late 7th–early 6th century BCE), inscribed in Paleo-Hebrew script, recovered during the Temple Mount Sifting Project from unstratified earth removed from the compound. The patronym Immer corresponds to a priestly family associated with temple administration in biblical texts.

While direct archaeological excavation within the compound has not been possible, many historians and biblical archaeologists reconstruct the site as the religious center and royal acropolis of the Kingdom of Judah during the Iron Age II. The First Temple is believed to have once been a part of a much larger royal complex. The Bible also mentions several other buildings constructed by Solomon at the site, including the royal palace, the "House of the Lebanon Forest", the "Hall of Pillars", the "Hall of Throne" and the "House of Pharaoh's Daughter". Some scholars believe that, in accordance with biblical accounts, the royal and religious compound on the Temple Mount was built by Solomon during the 10th century BCE as a separate entity, which was later incorporated into the city. Knauf argued that the Temple Mount already served as the cultic and governmental center of Jerusalem as early as in the Late Bronze Age. Alternatively, Na'aman suggested that Solomon built the Temple on a much smaller scale than the one described in the Bible, which was enlarged or rebuilt during the 8th century BCE. In 2014, Finkelstein, Koch and Lipschits proposed that the tell of ancient Jerusalem lies beneath the modern-day compound, rather than the nearby archeological site known as the City of David, as mainstream archaeology believes; however, this proposal, known as "the mound on the Mount" theory, was rejected by other scholars of the subject.

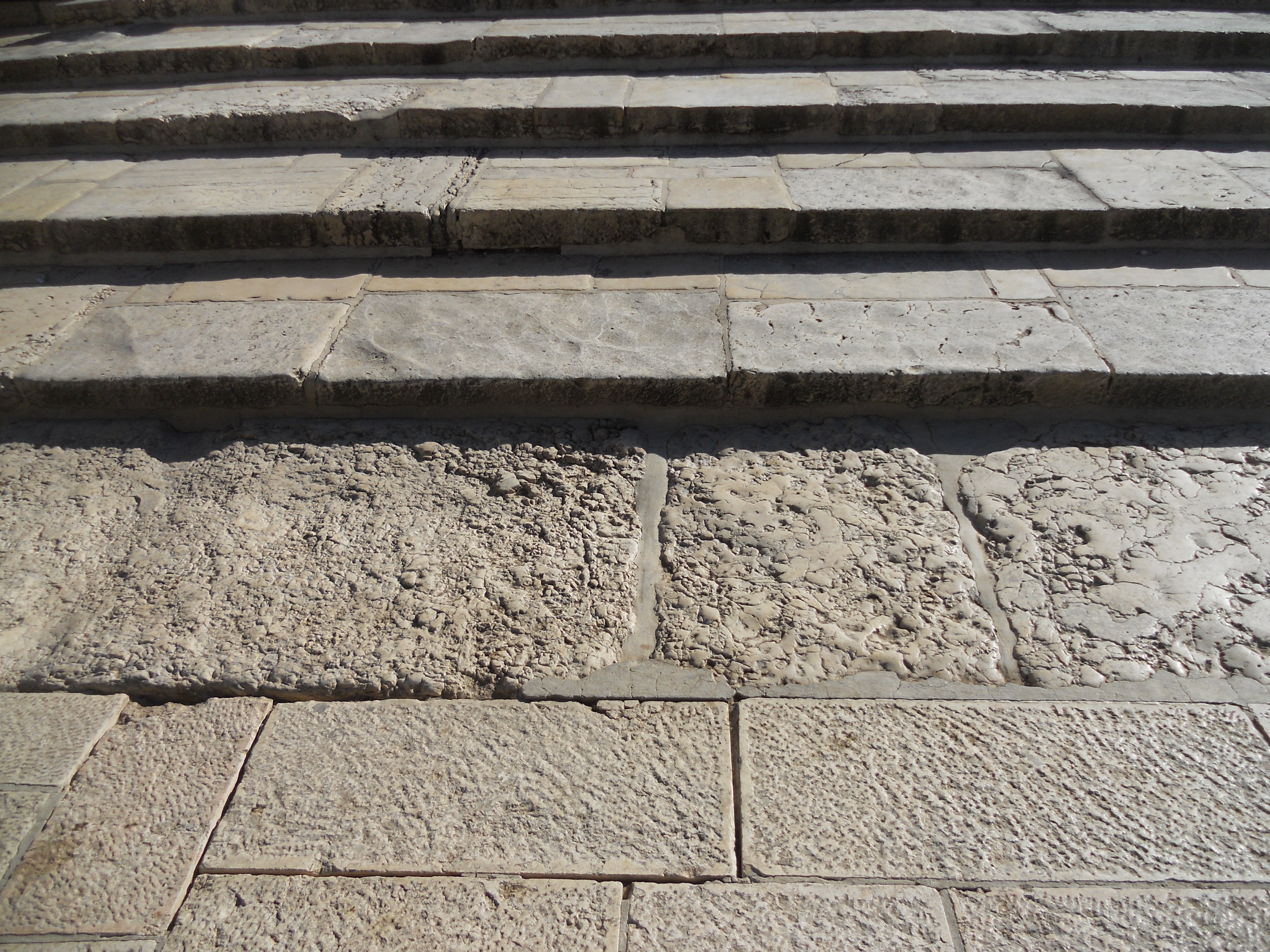
Remains of a wall in the northwest part of the elevated platform; Ritmeyer suggested that it is the top of a remaining stone course of the western wall of the Iron Age compound.

All scholars agree that the Iron Age Temple Mount was smaller than the Herodian compound still visible today. Some scholars, such as Kathleen Kenyon and Leen Ritmeyer, argued that the walls of the First Temple compound extended eastward as far as the Eastern Wall. Ritmeyer identifies specific courses of visible ashlars located to the north and south of the Golden Gate as Judean Iron Age in style, dating them to the construction of this wall by Hezekiah. More such stones are supposed to survive underground. Ritmeyer has also suggested that one of the steps leading to the Dome of the Rock is actually the top of a remaining stone course of the western wall of the Iron Age compound.

The First Temple was destroyed in 587/586 BCE by the Neo-Babylonian Empire under Nebuchadnezzar II.

=== Persian, Hellenistic and Hasmonean periods ===
Construction of the Second Temple began under Cyrus the Great in around 538 BCE and was completed in 516 BCE. It was built at the original site of Solomon's Temple.

Joseph Patrich and Marcos Edelcopp reconstruct a project of elevation and leveling of the outer court under High Priest Simon II (identified with Simeon the Just, who is mentioned in the Mishnah), during his tenure from around 219 to 196 BCE. The project included an approximately square courtyard of about 197.5 × 197.5 metres, supported by retaining walls, surrounded by stoas, and enclosing a precinct defined by the soreg (which itself defined a slight smaller, 186 x 186 metres square). They connect this project to the praise of Simon in the Book of Sirach for his restoration of the "House," his strengthening of the "Temple," and his laying of the foundations for an elevated courtyard enclosing the sacred precinct, from which non-Jews were prohibited, as well as his construction of a reservoir. Patrich and Edelcopp also use two documents of Seleucid king Antiochus III as evidence for Simon's construction works. One indicated a colonnaded court surrounding the sanctuary, while the ot her concerns restrictions on non-Jewish access.

Building activity continued during the Maccabean Revolt. Following his retaking of the city in 164 BCE, Judas Maccabeus is said to have fortified the precinct, constructing towers and raising the walls to defend it against the isolated Seleucid garrison at the Acra fortress to the south. Around 163/62 BCE, Lysias and Antiochus V captured the precinct and razed its new walls. Later, in 152 BCE, Judas's brother and successor Jonathan restored the walls and added towers.

Construction at the site continued under the Hasmonean dynasty, founded by Judas and Jonathan's brother Simon, who secured Judea's independence and whose descendants ruled it as a sovereign state. Patrich and Edelcopp contend that Simon's son, John Hyrcanus (r. 134–104 BCE), expanded the complex to the south and east, attaining for ideological reasons the ideal area of 500 × 500 cubits (approx. 262 x 262 meters) described in Ezekiel's vision. This is the same size recommended by the roughly contemporary Temple Scroll and later retrospectively described by the Mishnah (Middot 2:1). Patrich and Edelcopp argue that part of the present eastern wall follows as Hasmonean line which Herod later extended. They adopt the 500 x 500 cubits square identified by Ritmeyer as plausible, but reject his Iron Age/Persian period dating and attribute it instead to the Hasmonean period.

In 67 BCE a quarrel broke out between Aristobulus II and Hyrcanus II, sons of Alexander Jannaeus and Salome Alexandra, on the Hasmonean throne. Roman general Pompey, who had been invited to intervene in the conflict, sided with Hyrcanus; Aristobulus and his followers barricaded themselves inside the Temple Mount and destroyed the bridge linking it to the city. When the Roman Army arrived in Jerusalem, Pompey ordered the moat defending the Temple Mount from the north to be filled in. To accomplish this, Pompey waited for Shabbats, so the defenders would not disrupt the work. After a three-month siege, the Romans were able to topple one of the guard towers and storm the Temple Mount. Pompey himself entered the Holy of Holies, but did not harm the Temple, and allowed the priests to continue their work as usual.

=== Herodian and early Roman periods ===
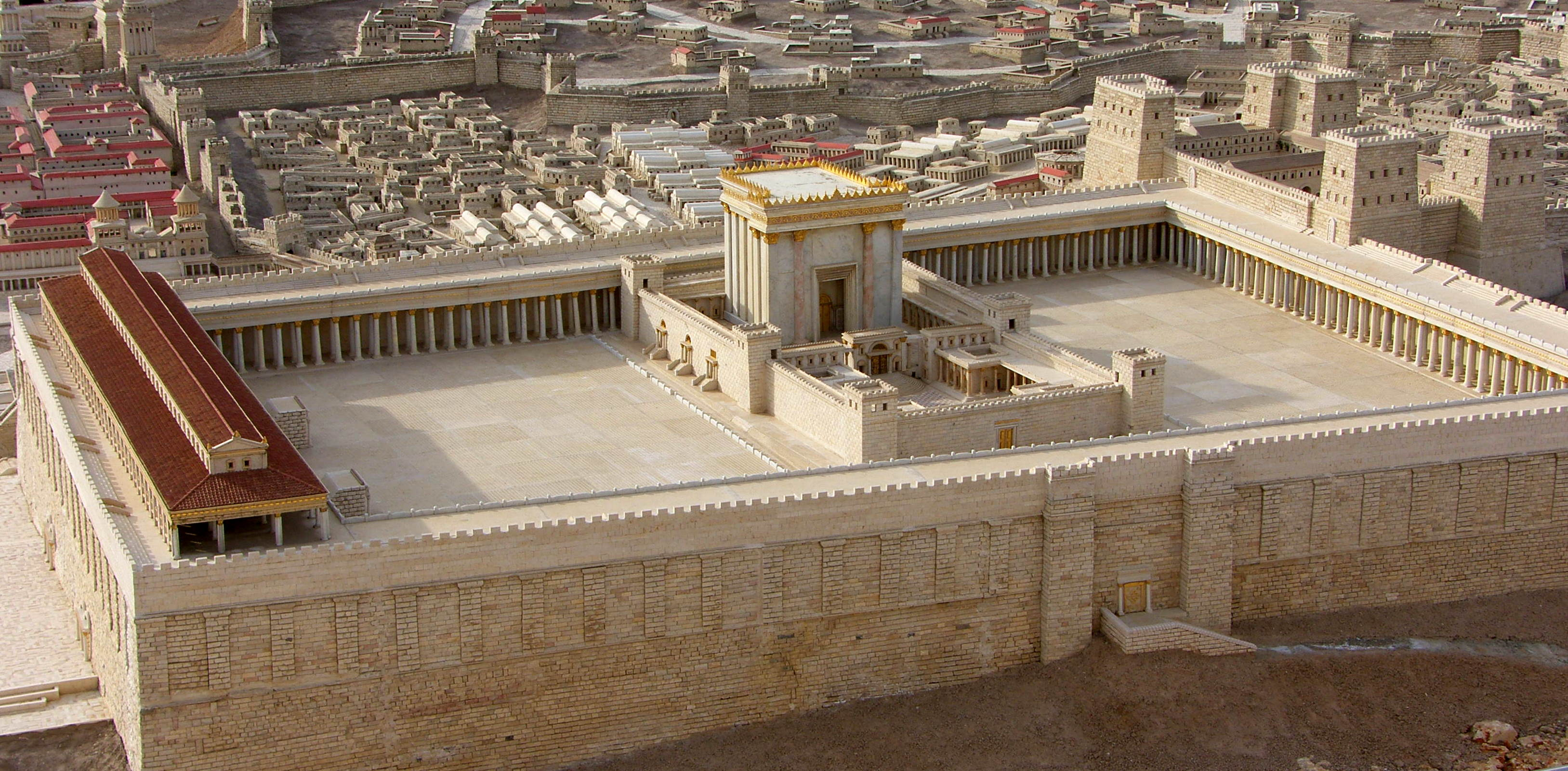
Scale model reconstruction of the Herodian Temple Mount complex, part of the Holyland Model of Jerusalem at the Israel Museum

Around 19 BCE, Herod the Great further expanded the Temple Mount and rebuilt the temple. The ambitious project, which involved the employment of 10,000 workers, more than doubled the size of the Temple Mount to approximately 36 acres (150,000 m^{2}). Herod leveled the area by cutting away rock on the northwest side and raising the sloping ground to the south. He achieved this by constructing huge buttress walls and vaults and filling the necessary sections with earth and rubble. The result was the largest temenos in the ancient world.

The main entrances to the Herodian Temple Mount were two sets of gates built into the southern wall, together with four other gates reachable from the western side by stairs and bridges. Grand stoas encircled the platform on three sides, and on its southern side stood a magnificent basilica Josephus referred to as the Royal Stoa. The Royal Stoa served as a center for the city's commercial and legal transactions, and was provided with separate access to the city below via the Robinson's Arch overpass. The Temple itself and its courts were located on an elevated platform in the middle of the larger compound. In addition to the restoration of the Temple, its courtyards and porticoes, Herod also built the Antonia Fortress, which dominated the northwestern corner of the Temple Mount, and a rainwater reservoir, Birket Israel, in the northeast. A monumental street, today referred to as the "Stepped Street", took pilgrims from the city's southern gate via the Tyropoeon Valley to the western side of the Temple Mount. It has been proposed in 2019 that Pontius Pilate constructed the road during the 30s.

=== Destruction of the Temple (70 CE) ===
During the early phases of the First Jewish–Roman War (66–70 CE), the Temple Mount became a center of fighting for various Jewish factions struggling for control of the city, with different factions holding the area during the conflict. In April 70, the Roman army under Titus reached Jerusalem and began besieging the city. It took the Romans four months to defeat the Temple Mount's defenders and take the site. The Romans completely destroyed the Temple and all the other structures on the platform.

Stones from the Temple Mount complex lying on the ancient street below the Western Wall at the Jerusalem Archaeological Park

Massive stone collapses from the upper walls were discovered laying over the Herodian street that runs along the southern part of the Western Wall. Excavations also recovered hundreds of architectural fragments below the southern wall, attributed on stylistic grounds to the Royal Stoa. Geological analysis found white crusts and gray discoloration on the stones consistent with soot absorption and conversion to calcium oxide, indicating sustained burning above 800 °C (1,470 °F). One limestone rosette also preserved a veneer of bone dust fused into its surface through vitrification, though whether the bone was human or animal could not be determined.

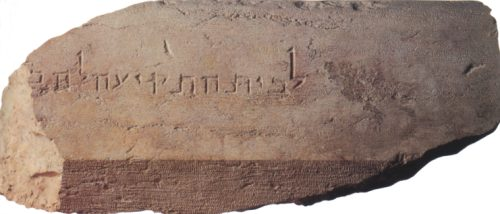
The Trumpeting Place inscription, a stone (2.43x1 m) with Hebrew inscription לבית התקיעה להב "To the Trumpeting Place" excavated by Benjamin Mazar at the southern foot of the Temple Mount is believed to be a part of the Second Temple.

Near the southern end of the Western Wall, excavators recovered the Trumpeting Place inscription, a stone marking the spot where a priest would sound a trumpet to announce the beginning and end of Shabbat. The inscription's placement corresponds to a station described by Josephus, who writes that Jewish rebels built a tower above this same spot to gain height for hurling missiles at the Roman legionaries below.

=== Middle/Late Roman period ===
The city of Aelia Capitolina was built in 130 CE by the Roman emperor Hadrian and occupied by a Roman colony on the site of Jerusalem, which was still in ruins from the First Jewish Revolt in 70 CE. Aelia came from Hadrian's nomen gentile, Aelius, while Capitolina meant that the new city was dedicated to Jupiter Capitolinus, to whom a temple was built overlapping the site of the former second Jewish temple, the Temple Mount.

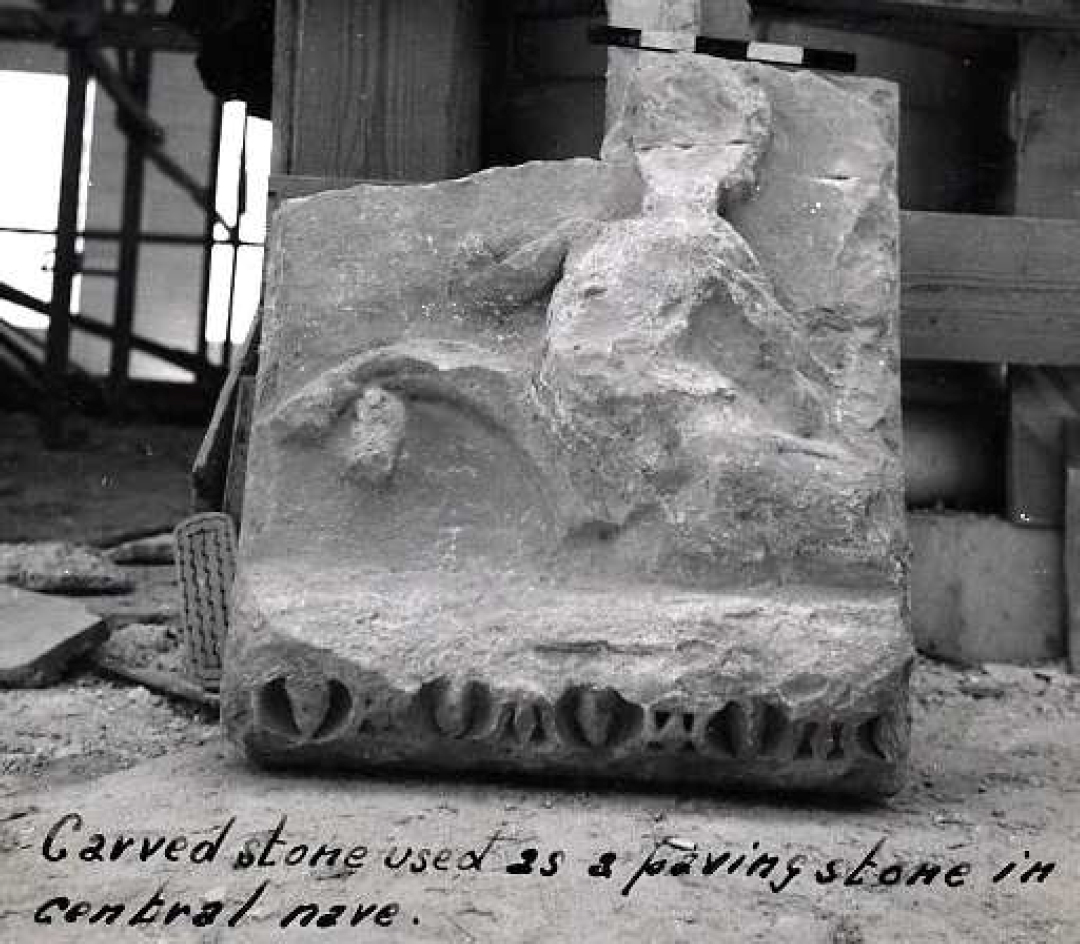
Roman centaur relief (135–325 CE) reused as a floor panel in the al-Aqsa Mosque, was found during restoration work in the 1930s

Hadrian had intended the construction of the new city as a gift to the Jews, but since he had constructed a giant statue of himself in front of the Temple of Jupiter and the Temple of Jupiter had a huge statue of Jupiter inside it, there were on the Temple Mount now two enormous graven images, which Jews considered idolatrous. It was also customary in Roman rites to sacrifice a pig in land purification ceremonies. After the Third Jewish Revolt, all Jews were forbidden on pain of death from entering the city or the surrounding territory around the city.

In circa 318 CE, the Christian scholar Eusebius wrote that, in his time, stones from the ruined Temple Mount were still being reused in pagan construction projects. In his Proof of the Gospel, writes: "It is sad for the eyes to see stones from the Temple itself, and from its ancient sanctuary and holy place, used for the building of idol temples, and of theatres for the populace." In the same work he also provided evidence for guided tours in which Christian pilgrims were brought to the Mount of Olives to look out over the ruined Temple Mount.

=== Byzantine period ===
Emperor Constantine I promoted the Christianization of Roman society, giving it precedence over pagan cults. One consequence was that Hadrian's Temple to Jupiter on the Temple Mount was demolished immediately following the First Council of Nicea in 325 CE on orders of Constantine.

The Bordeaux Pilgrim, who visited Jerusalem in 333–334, during the reign of Emperor Constantine I, wrote that "There are two statues of Hadrian, and, not far from them, a pierced stone to which the Jews come every year and anoint. They mourn and rend their garments, and then depart." The occasion is assumed to have been Tisha b'Av, since decades later Jerome related that that was the only day on which Jews were permitted to enter Jerusalem.

Constantine's nephew Emperor Julian granted permission in the year 363 for the Jews to rebuild the Temple. In a letter attributed to Julian he wrote to the Jews that "This you ought to do, in order that, when I have successfully concluded the war in Persia, I may rebuild by my own efforts the sacred city of Jerusalem, which for so many years you have longed to see inhabited, and may bring settlers there, and, together with you, may glorify the Most High God therein." Julian saw the Jewish God as a fitting member of the pantheon of gods he believed in, and he was also a strong opponent of Christianity. Church historians wrote that the Jews began to clear away the structures and rubble on the Temple Mount but were thwarted, first by a great earthquake, and then by miracles that included fire springing from the earth. However, no contemporary Jewish sources mention this episode directly. A synagogue was later built on the site, according to Philostorgius, and Jews in the fourth century visited the Temple Mount to pray.

During his excavations in the 1930s, Robert Hamilton uncovered portions of a multicolor mosaic floor with geometric patterns, but did not publish them. The date of the mosaic is disputed: Zachi Dvira considers that they are from the pre-Islamic Byzantine period, while Baruch, Reich and Sandhaus favor a much later Umayyad origin on account of their similarity to a mosaic from an Umayyad palace excavated adjacent to the Temple Mount's southern wall. By comparing the photographs to Hamilton's excavation report, Di Cesare determined that they belong to the second phase of mosque construction in the Umayyad period. Moreover, the mosaic designs were common in Islamic, Jewish and Christian buildings from the 2nd to the 8th century. Di Cesare suggested that Hamilton did not include the mosaics in his book because they were destroyed to explore beneath them.

=== Sassanid period ===
In 610, the Sassanid Empire drove the Byzantine Empire out of the Middle East, giving the Jews control of Jerusalem for the first time in centuries. The Jews in Palestine were allowed to set up a vassal state under the Sassanid Empire called the Sassanid Jewish Commonwealth which lasted for five years. Jewish rabbis ordered the restart of animal sacrifice for the first time since the time of Second Temple and started to reconstruct the Jewish Temple. Shortly before the Byzantines took the area back five years later in 615, the Persians gave control to the Christian population, who tore down the partially built Jewish Temple edifice and turned it into a garbage dump, which is what it was when the Rashidun Caliph Umar took the city in 637.

=== Early Muslim period ===
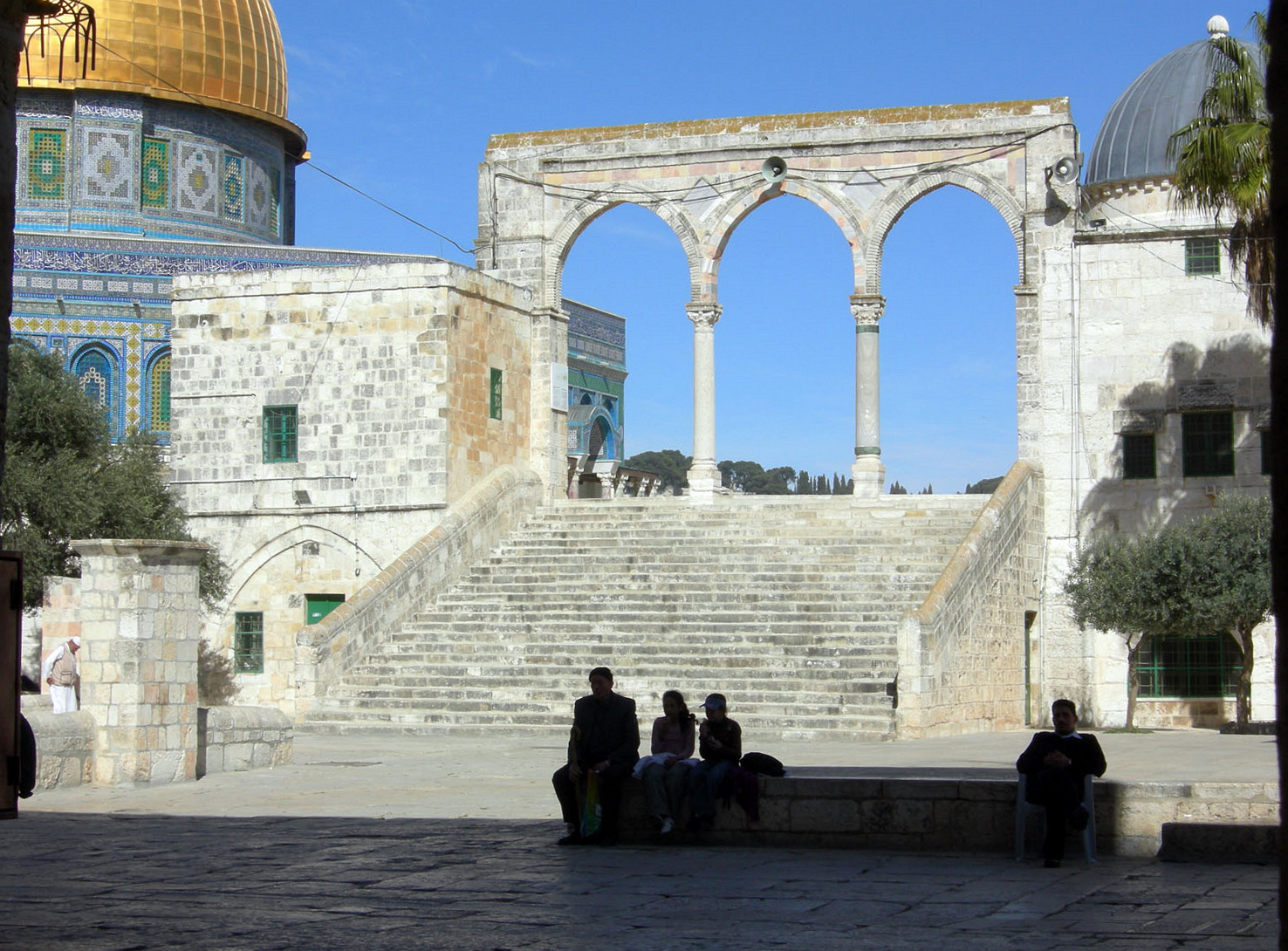
The Southwest qanatir (arches) of the Haram al Sharif; Qubat al-Nahawiyya is also partially visible to the right.

In 637, Arabs besieged and captured the city from the Byzantine Empire, which had defeated the Persian forces and their allies, and reconquered the city. There are no contemporary records, but many traditions, about the origin of the main Islamic buildings on the mount. A popular account from later centuries is that the Rashidun Caliph Umar was led to the place reluctantly by the Christian patriarch Sophronius. He found it covered with rubbish, but the sacred Rock was found with the help of a converted Jew, Ka'b al-Ahbar. Al-Ahbar advised Umar to build a mosque to the north of the rock, so that worshippers would face both the rock and Mecca, but instead Umar chose to build it to the south of the rock. It became known as al-Aqsa Mosque. According to Muslim sources, Jews participated in the construction of the haram, laying the groundwork for both al-Aqsa and the Dome of the Rock mosques. The first known eyewitness testimony is that of the pilgrim Arculf who visited about 670. According to Arculf's account as recorded by Adomnán, he saw a rectangular wooden house of prayer built over some ruins, large enough to hold 3,000 people.

In 691, an octagonal Islamic building topped by a dome was built by the Caliph Abd al-Malik around the rock, for a myriad of political, dynastic and religious reasons, built on local and Quranic traditions articulating the site's holiness, a process in which textual and architectural narratives reinforced one another. The shrine became known as the Dome of the Rock (قبة الصخرة, Qubbat as-Sakhra). (The dome itself was covered in gold in 1920.) In 715, the Umayyads, led by the Caliph al-Walid I, built al-Aqsa Mosque (المسجد الأقصى, al-Masjid al-'Aqṣā, lit. "Furthest Mosque"), corresponding to the Islamic belief of Muhammad's miraculous nocturnal journey as recounted in the Quran and hadith. The term "Noble Sanctuary" or "Haram al-Sharif", as it was called later by the Mamluks and Ottomans, refers to the entirer area that surrounds that Rock.

=== Crusader and Ayyubid period ===
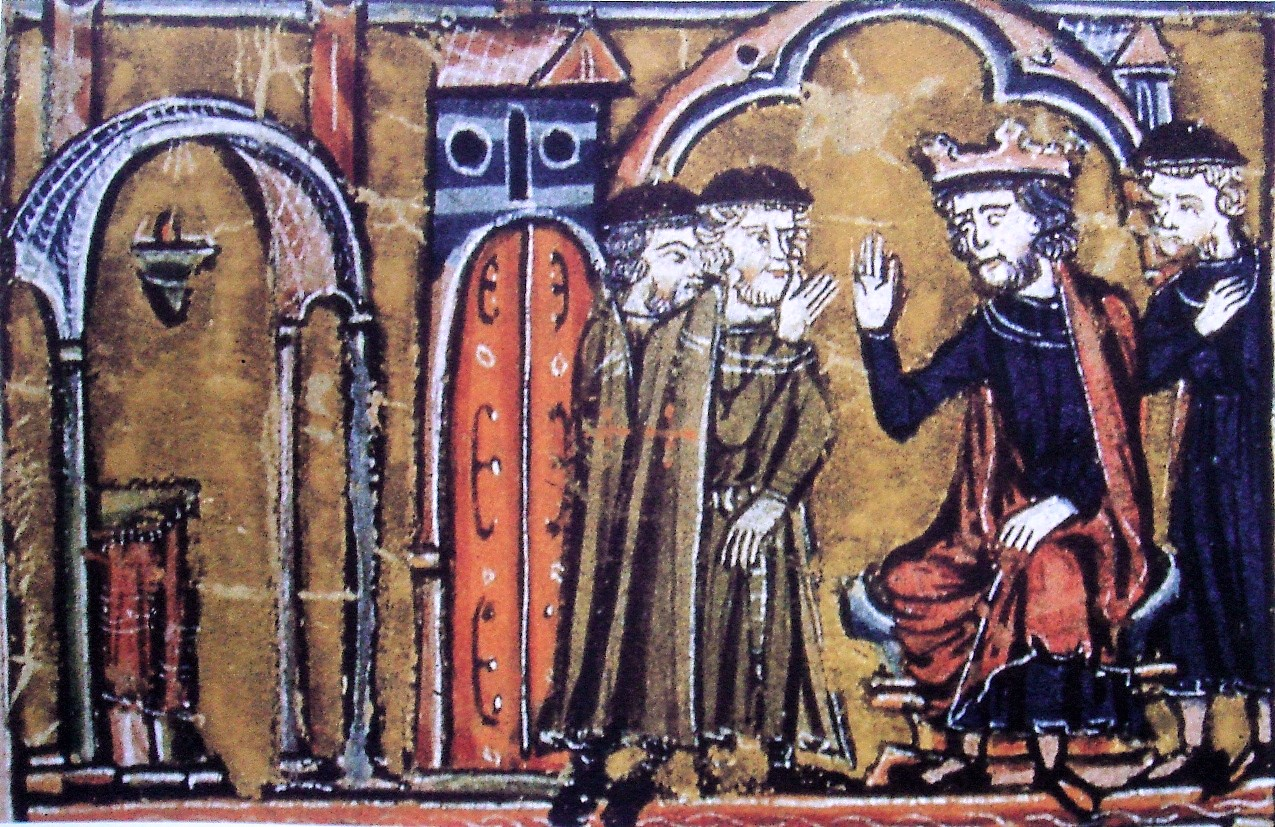
Baldwin II of Jerusalem, assigning the captured Al-Aqsa Mosque to Hugues de Payens and Godfrey

The Crusader period began in 1099 with the First Crusade's capture of Jerusalem. After the city's conquest, the Crusading order known as the Knights Templar was granted use of Al-Aqsa Mosque to use as their headquarters. This was probably by Baldwin II of Jerusalem and Warmund, Patriarch of Jerusalem at the Council of Nablus in January 1120. The Temple Mount had a mystique because it was above what were believed to be the ruins of the Temple of Solomon. The Crusaders therefore referred to al-Aqsa Mosque as Solomon's Temple, and it was from this location that the new Order took the name of "Poor Knights of Christ and the Temple of Solomon", or "Templar" knights.

In 1187, once he retook Jerusalem, Saladin removed all traces of Christian worship from the Temple Mount, returning the Dome of the Rock and al-Aqsa Mosque to their Muslim purposes. It remained in Muslim hands thereafter, even during the relatively short periods of Crusader rule following the Sixth Crusade.

=== Mamluk period ===
There are several Mamluk buildings on and around the Haram esplanade, such as the late 15th-century al-Ashrafiyya Madrasa and Sabil (fountain) of Qaytbay. The Mamluks also raised the level of Jerusalem's Central or Tyropoean Valley bordering the Temple Mount from the west by constructing huge substructures, on which they then built on a large scale. The Mamluk-period substructures and over-ground buildings are thus covering much of the Herodian western wall of the Temple Mount.

=== Ottoman period ===
Following the Ottoman conquest of Palestine in 1516, the Ottoman authorities continued the policy of prohibiting non-Muslims from setting foot on the Temple Mount until the early 19th century, when non-Muslims were again permitted to visit the site.

In the mid-19th century, the British consul in Jerusalem, James Finn, described the Temple Mount as guarded by African Muslims called "Takarni", whom he identified as originating from Darfur. Finn reported that Europeans approaching the entrances were sometimes beaten with clubs or pelted with stones by the guards. He also recorded an incident in 1851 in which a Muslim soldier praying inside the sanctuary was challenged by a Muslim devotee who doubted he was a Muslim, and who struck him across the face with a sword. The soldier died the following day. His wife, Elizabeth Anne Finn, wrote that the African "Takruri" guards were organized under their own chief and armed with large clubs. She reported that they had once killed a high-ranking Muslim pilgrim from India after failing to recognize his clothing as Muslim. In 1855, she recounted, the Ottoman governor confined the guards to prevent them from interfering with the visit of the Duke of Brabant, the future Leopold II of Belgium.

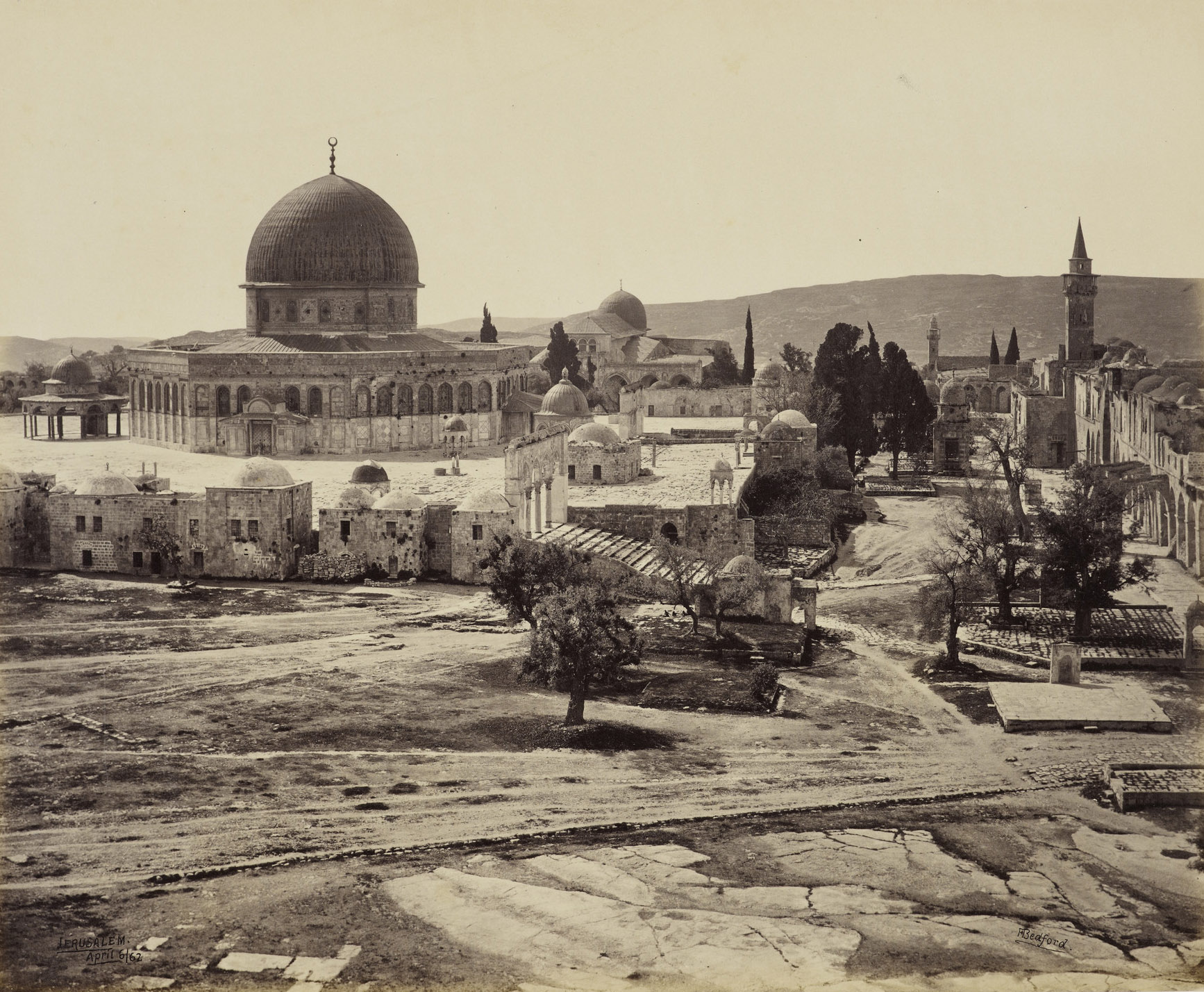
Temple Mount, photographed by Francis Bedford, 1862

In 1867, a team from the Royal Engineers, led by Lieutenant Charles Warren and financed by the Palestine Exploration Fund (P.E.F.), discovered a series of tunnels near the Temple Mount. Warren secretly excavated some tunnels near the Temple Mount walls and was the first one to document their lower courses. Warren also conducted some small-scale excavations inside the Temple Mount, by removing rubble that blocked passages leading from the Double Gate chamber.

=== British Mandatory period ===
Between 1922 and 1924, the Dome of the Rock was restored by the Islamic Higher Council. The Zionist movement at the time was strongly opposed to any notion that the Temple itself might be rebuilt. Indeed, its armed wing, the Haganah militia, assassinated a Jewish man when his plan to blow up the Islamic sites on the Haram came to their attention in 1931. Renovations were also conducted at the Al-Aqsa Mosque from 1938–1942, following an earthquake in the summer of 1937.

=== Jordanian period ===
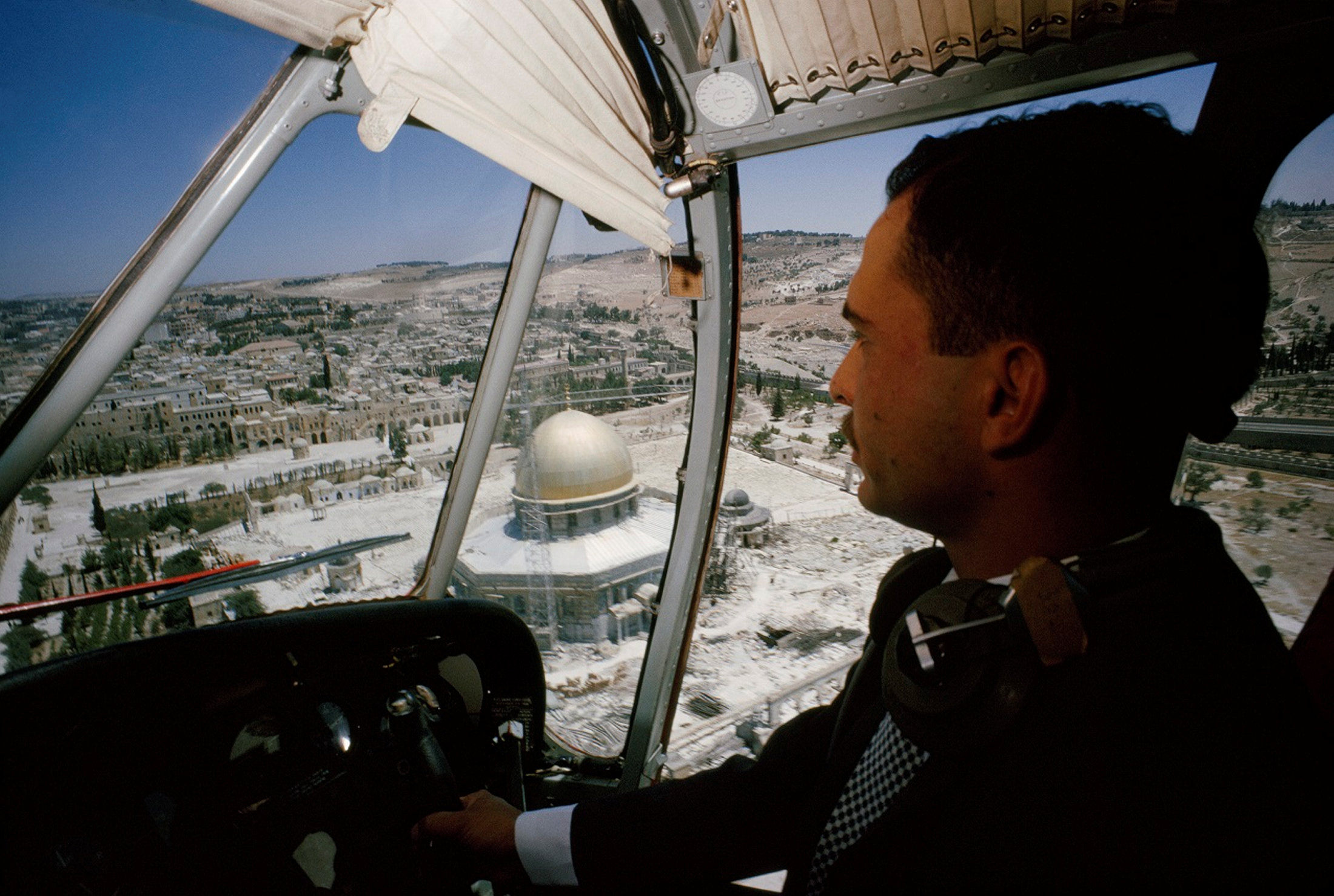
King Hussein flying over the Temple Mount while it was under Jordanian control, 1965

Jordan undertook two renovations of the Dome of the Rock, replacing the leaking, wooden inner dome with an aluminum dome in 1952, and, when the new dome leaked, carrying out a second restoration between 1959 and 1964.

Neither Israeli Arabs nor Israeli Jews could visit their holy places in the Jordanian territories during this period.

=== Israeli period ===
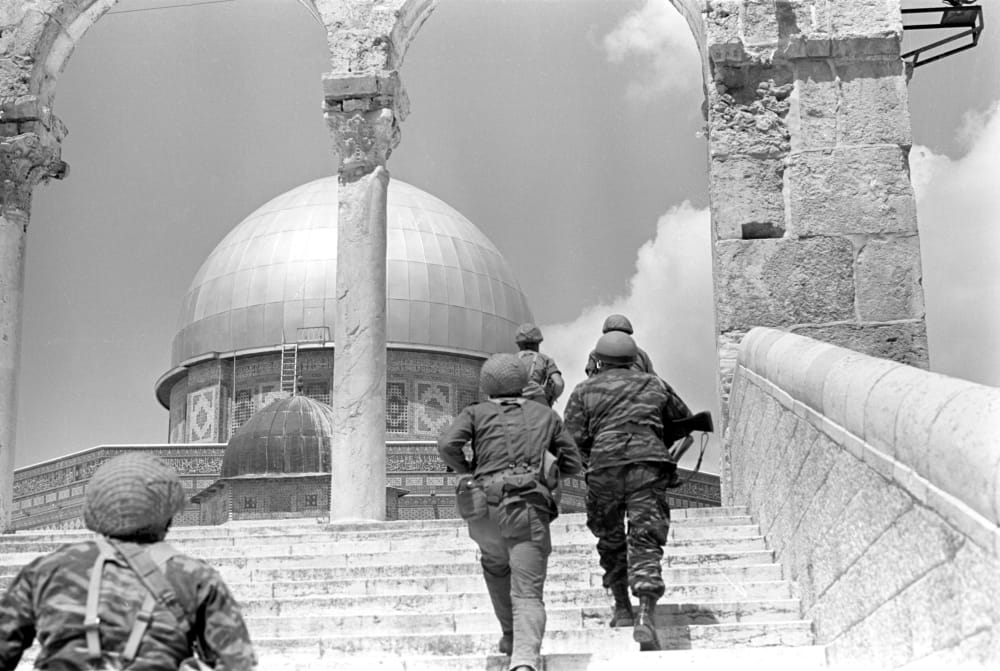
Israeli paratroopers entering the Temple Mount through the Lions Gate in 1967

On 7 June 1967, during the Six-Day War, Israeli forces advanced beyond the 1949 Armistice Agreement Line into West Bank territories, taking control of the Old City of Jerusalem, inclusive of the Temple Mount.

The Chief Rabbi of the Israel Defense Forces, Shlomo Goren, led the soldiers in religious celebrations on the Temple Mount and at the Western Wall. The Israeli Chief Rabbinate also declared a religious holiday on the anniversary, called "Yom Yerushalayim" (Jerusalem Day), which became a national holiday to commemorate the reunification of Jerusalem. Many saw the capture of Jerusalem and the Temple Mount as a miraculous liberation of biblical-messianic proportions. A few days after the war over 200,000 Jews flocked to the Western Wall in the first mass Jewish pilgrimage near the Mount since the destruction of the Temple in 70 CE. Islamic authorities did not disturb Goren when he went to pray on the Mount until, on the Ninth Day of Av, he brought 50 followers and introduced both a shofar, and a portable ark to pray, an innovation which alarmed the Waqf authorities and led to a deterioration of relations between the Muslim authorities and the Israeli government.

In June 1969, an Australian set fire to the Jami'a al-Aqsa. On April 11, 1982, a Jew hid in the Dome of the Rock and sprayed gunfire, killing 2 Palestinians and wounding 44; in 1974, 1977 and 1983 groups led by Yoel Lerner conspired to blow up both the Dome of the Rock and al-Aqsa. On 26 January 1984 Waqf guards detected members of B'nei Yehuda, a messianic cult of former gangsters turned mystics based in Lifta, trying to infiltrate the area to blow it up.

On 15 January 1988, during the First Intifada, Israeli troops fired rubber bullets and tear gas at protesters outside the mosque, wounding 40 worshipers.

On October 8, 1990, Israeli forces patrolling the site blocked worshippers from reaching it. A tear gas canister was set off among the female worshippers, which caused events to escalate. On 12 October 1990 Palestinian Muslims protested violently the intention of some extremist Jews to lay a cornerstone on the site for a New Temple as a prelude to the destruction of the Muslim mosques. The attempt was blocked by Israeli authorities but demonstrators were widely reported as having stoned Jews at the Western Wall. According to Palestinian historian Rashid Khalidi, investigative journalism has shown this allegation to be false. Rocks were eventually thrown, while security forces fired rounds that killed 21 people and injuring 150 more. An Israeli inquiry found Israeli forces at fault, but it also concluded that charges could not be brought against any particular individuals.

On 8 October 1990, 22 Palestinians were killed and over 100 others injured by Israeli Border Police during protests that were triggered by the announcement of the Temple Mount Faithful, a group of religious Jews, that they were going to lay the cornerstone of the Third Temple. Between 1992 and 1994, the Jordanian government undertook the unprecedented step of gilding the dome of the Dome of the Rock, covering it with 5000 gold plates, and restoring and reinforcing the structure. Saladin's minbar was also reconstructed. The project was paid for by King Hussein personally, at a cost of $8 million. The Temple Mount remains, under the terms of the 1994 Israel–Jordan peace treaty, under Jordanian custodianship. In December 1997, Israeli security services preempted an attempt by Jewish extremists to throw a pig's head wrapped in the pages of the Quran into the area, in order to spark a riot and embarrass the government.

On 28 September 2000, then-opposition leader of Israel Ariel Sharon and members of the Likud Party, along with 1,000 armed guards, visited the al-Aqsa compound. The visit was seen as a provocative gesture by many Palestinians, who gathered around the site. After Sharon and the Likud Party members left, a demonstration erupted and Palestinians on the grounds of the Haram al-Sharif began throwing stones and other projectiles at Israeli riot police. Police fired tear gas and rubber bullets at the crowd, injuring 24 people. The visit sparked a five-year uprising by the Palestinians, commonly referred to as the al-Aqsa Intifada, though some commentators, citing subsequent speeches by Palestinian Authority officials, particularly Imad Falouji and Yasar Arafat, claim that the Intifada had been planned months in advance, as early as July upon Arafat's return from Camp David talks in the United States. On 29 September, the Israeli government deployed 2,000 riot police to the mosque. When a group of Palestinians left the mosque after Friday prayers (Jumu'ah,) they hurled stones at the police. The police then stormed the mosque compound, firing both live ammunition and rubber bullets at the group of Palestinians, killing four and wounding about 200.

On 3 January 2023, Israeli Minister of National Security Itamar Ben-Gvir visited the Temple Mount in Jerusalem, sparking protests by Palestinians and the condemnation of several Arab countries.

== Status quo ==
=== Under Muslim control ===
Jews were not allowed to visit for approximately one thousand years.

=== British Mandate ===
In the first ten years of British rule in Palestine, all were allowed entry to the Temple Mount/Haram al-Sharif complex. Sometimes violence broke out at the entrance between Jews and Muslims. During the 1929 Palestine riots, Jews were accused of violating the status quo. Following the riots, the Supreme Muslim Council and the Jerusalem Islamic Waqf prohibited Jews from entering the site's gates. During the mandate period, Jewish leaders celebrated ancient religious practices at the Western Wall. The ban on visitors continued until 1948

=== Jordanian control (1948–1967) ===
Although Article VIII of the 1949 Israel–Jordan Armistice Agreement provided for the resumption of normal operations at the cultural and humanitarian institutions on Mount Scopus, free access to religious sites, and the continued use of the Mount of Olives Jewish Cemetery, these provisions were never implemented. The city remained divided by barbed wire, walls, and a fortified no man's land.

During the partition, Israeli Jews were barred from visiting the Western Wall and the Haram al-Sharif/Temple Mount, while Israeli Arabs were largely unable to access holy sites in the Old City. Numerous Jewish religious sites, synagogues, and cemeteries in the Jordanian-controlled sector were damaged, destroyed, or repurposed, while Muslim and Christian heritage sites in Israeli-controlled West Jerusalem also suffered damage, expropriation, or neglect.

=== Under Israeli control ===
A few days after the Six-Day War, on June 17, 1967, a meeting was held at the al-Aqsa mosque between Moshe Dayan and Muslim religious authorities of Jerusalem reformulating the status quo. Jews were given the right to visit the Temple Mount unobstructed and free of charge if they respected Muslims' religious feelings and acted decently, but they were not allowed to pray. The Western Wall was to remain the Jewish place of prayer. 'Religious sovereignty' was to remain with the Muslims while 'overall sovereignty' became Israeli. The Muslims objected to Dayan's offer, as they completely rejected the Israeli conquest of Jerusalem and the Temple Mount. Some Jews, led by Shlomo Goren, then the military chief rabbi, had objected as well, claiming the decision handed over the complex to the Muslims, since the Western Wall's holiness is derived from the Mount and symbolizes exile, while praying on the Mount symbolizes freedom and the return of the Jewish people to their homeland. The President of the High Court of Justice, Aharon Barak, in response to an appeal in 1976 against police interference with an individual's putative right to prayer on the site, expressed the view that, while Jews had a right to prayer there, it was not absolute but subject to the public interest and the rights of other groups. Israel's courts have considered the issue as one beyond their remit, and, given the delicacy of the matter, under political jurisdiction. Barak wrote:

The basic principle is that every Jew has the right to enter the Temple Mount, to pray there, and to have communion with his maker. This is part of the religious freedom of worship, it is part of the freedom of expression. However, as with every human right, it is not absolute, but a relative right... Indeed, in a case where there is near certainty that injury may be caused to the public interest if a person's rights of religious worship and freedom of expression would be realized, it is possible to limit the rights of the person in order to uphold the public interest.

Police continued to forbid Jews to pray on the Temple Mount. Subsequently, several prime ministers also made attempts to change the status quo but failed. In October 1986, an agreement between the Temple Mount Faithful, the Supreme Muslim Council and police, which would allow short visits in small groups, was exercised once and never repeated, after 2,000 Muslims armed with stones and bottles attacked the group and stoned worshipers at the Western Wall. During the 1990s, additional attempts were made for Jewish prayer on the Temple Mount, which were stopped by Israeli police.

Until 2000, non-Muslim visitors could enter the Dome of the Rock, al-Aqsa Mosque and the Islamic Museum by getting a ticket from the Waqf. This procedure ended when the Second Intifada erupted. Fifteen years later, negotiation between Israel and Jordan might result in reopening of those sites once again.

In the 2010s, fear arose among Palestinians that Israel planned to change the status quo and permit Jewish prayers or that al-Aqsa mosque might be damaged or destroyed by Israel. Al-Aqsa was used as a base for attacks on visitors and the police from which stones, firebombs and fireworks were thrown. The Israeli police had never entered al-Aqsa Mosque until November 5, 2014, when dialog with the leaders of the Waqf and the rioters failed. This resulted in imposing strict limitations on entry of visitors to the Temple Mount. Israeli leadership repeatedly stated that the status quo would not change. According to then Jerusalem police commissioner Yohanan Danino, the place is at the center of a "holy war" and "anyone who wants to change the status quo on the Temple Mount should not be allowed up there", citing an "extreme right-wing agenda to change the status quo on the Temple Mount"; Hamas and Islamic Jihad continued to erroneously assert that the Israeli government planned to destroy the al-Aqsa Mosque, resulting in chronic terrorist attacks and rioting.

There have been several changes to the status quo:

1. Jewish visits are often prevented or considerably restricted.
2. Jews and other non-Islamic visitors can only visit from Sunday to Thursday, for four hours each day.
3. Visits inside the mosques are not allowed.
4. Jews with religious appearance must visit in groups monitored by Waqf guards and policemen.

Many Palestinians believe the status quo is threatened since right-wing Israelis have been challenging it with more force and frequency, asserting a religious right to pray there. Until Israel banned them, members of Murabitat, a group of women, cried 'Allah Akbar' at groups of Jewish visitors to remind them the Temple Mount was still in Muslim hands. In October 2021, a Jewish man, Aryeh Lippo, who was banned by Israeli police from the Temple Mount for fifteen days after being caught quietly praying, had his ban overturned by an Israeli court on the grounds that his behavior had not violated police instructions. Hamas called the ruling "a clear declaration of war". A higher Israel court quickly reversed the lower court's ruling.

== Management and access ==
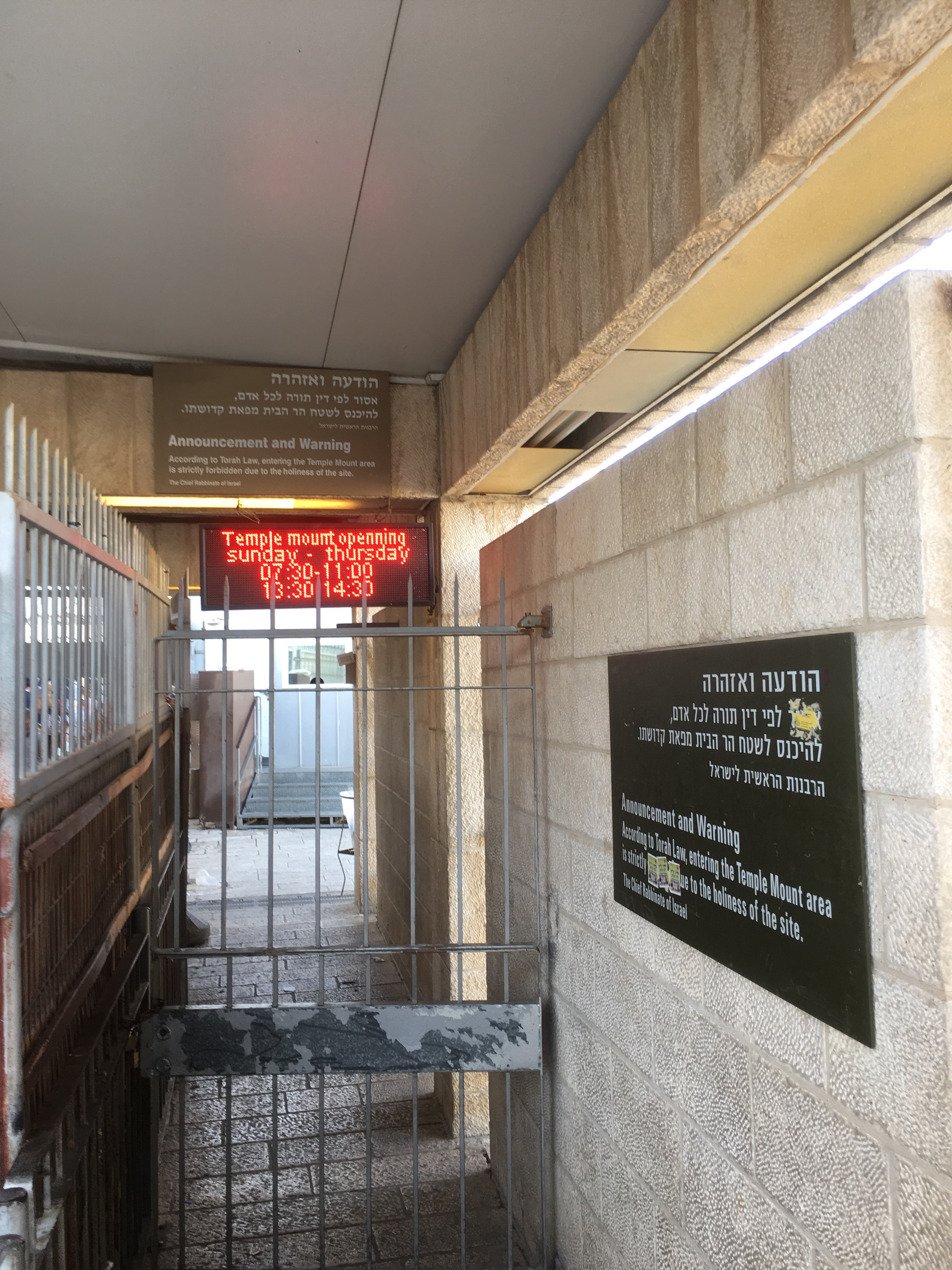
A security gate guarding the entrance to the site

An Islamic Waqf has managed the Temple Mount continuously since the Muslim reconquest of the Latin Kingdom of Jerusalem in 1187. On June 7, 1967, soon after Israel had taken control of the area during the Six-Day War, Prime Minister Levi Eshkol assured that "no harm whatsoever shall come to the places sacred to all religions". Together with the extension of Israeli jurisdiction and administration over east Jerusalem, the Knesset passed the Preservation of the Holy Places Law, ensuring protection of the Holy Places against desecration, as well as freedom of access thereto. The site remains within the area controlled by the State of Israel, with administration of the site remaining in the hands of the Jerusalem Islamic Waqf.

Although freedom of access was enshrined in the law, as a security measure, the Israeli government now enforces a ban on non-Muslim prayer on the site. Non-Muslims who are observed praying on the site are subject to expulsion by the police. At various times, when there is fear of Arab rioting upon the mount resulting in throwing stones from above towards the Western Wall Plaza, Israel has prevented Muslim men under 45 from praying in the compound, citing these concerns. Sometimes such restrictions have coincided with Friday prayers during the Islamic holy month of Ramadan. Normally, West Bank Palestinians are allowed access to Jerusalem only during Islamic holidays, with access usually restricted to men over 35 and women of any age eligible for permits to enter the city. Palestinian residents of Jerusalem, which because of Israel's annexation of Jerusalem, hold Israeli permanent residency cards, and Israeli Arabs, are permitted unrestricted access to the Temple Mount. The Mughrabi Gate is the only entrance to the Temple Mount accessible to non-Muslims.

== Jewish attitudes towards entering the site ==
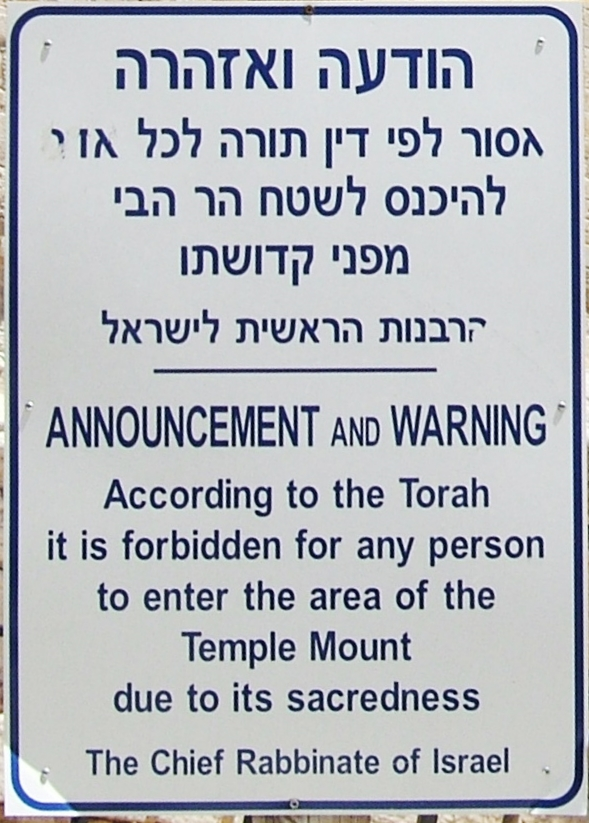
Sign in Hebrew and English outside the Temple Mount stating that "According to the Torah, it is forbidden for any person to enter the area of the Temple Mount due to its sacredness"

Due to religious restrictions on entering the most sacred areas of the Temple Mount (see following section), the Western Wall, a retaining wall for the Temple Mount and remnant of the Second Temple structure, is considered by some rabbinical authorities to be the holiest accessible site for Jews to pray. A 2013 Knesset committee hearing considered allowing Jews to pray at the site, amidst heated debate. Arab-Israeli MPs were ejected for disrupting the hearing, after shouting at the chairman, calling her a "pyromaniac". Religious Affairs Minister Eli Ben-Dahan of Jewish Home said his ministry was seeking legal ways to enable Jews to pray at the site.

=== Jewish religious law concerning entry to the site ===
During Temple times, entry to the Mount was limited by a complex set of purity laws. Persons suffering from corpse uncleanness were not allowed to enter the inner court. Non-Jews were also prohibited from entering the inner court of the Temple. A hewn stone measuring 60 cm × 90 cm (24 in × 35 in) and engraved with Greek uncials was discovered in 1871 near a court on the Temple Mount in Jerusalem in which it outlined this prohibition:

ΜΗΟΕΝΑΑΛΛΟΓΕΝΗΕΙΣΠΟ
ΡΕΥΕΣΟΑΙΕΝΤΟΣΤΟΥΠΕ
ΡΙΤΟΙΕΡΟΝΤΡΥΦΑΚΤΟΥΚΑΙ
ΠΕΡΙΒΟΛΟΥΟΣΔΑΝΛΗ
ΦΘΗΕΑΥΤΩΙΑΙΤΙΟΣΕΣ
ΤΑΙΔΙΑΤΟΕΞΑΚΟΛΟΥ
ΘΕΙΝΘΑΝΑΤΟΝ

Translation: "Let no foreigner enter within the parapet and the partition which surrounds the Temple precincts. Anyone caught [violating] will be held accountable for his ensuing death." Today, the stone is preserved in Istanbul's Museum of Antiquities.

Maimonides wrote that it was only permitted to enter the site to fulfill a religious precept. After the destruction of the Temple there was discussion as to whether the site, bereft of the Temple, still maintained its holiness. Jewish codifiers accepted the opinion of Maimonides who ruled that the holiness of the Temple sanctified the site for eternity and consequently the restrictions on entry to the site remain in force. While secular Jews ascend freely, the question of whether ascending is permitted is a matter of some debate among religious authorities, with a majority holding that it is permitted to ascend to the Temple Mount, but not to step on the site of the inner courtyards of the ancient Temple. The question then becomes whether the site can be ascertained accurately.

There is debate over whether reports that Maimonides himself ascended the Mount are reliable. One such report claims that he did so on Thursday, October 21, 1165, during the Crusader period. Some early scholars however, claim that entry onto certain areas of the Mount is permitted. It appears that Radbaz also entered the Mount and advised others how to do this. He permits entry from all the gates into the 135 x 135 cubits of the Women's Courtyard in the east, since the biblical prohibition only applies to the 187 x 135 cubits of the Temple in the west. There are also Christian and Islamic sources which indicate that Jews visited the site, but these visits may have been made under duress.

Those persons who suffered a nocturnal emission and who have not yet immersed themselves in a ritual bath were permitted to enter the Court of the Israelites, but were prohibited from entering the Court of the Levites and the Court of the Priests until they had immersed. Entrance into the areas of the other two courts was strictly forbidden to those who had not immersed themselves and who had been defiled by corpse uncleanness and who had not yet been purified. Since the latter state of impurity is pervasive, and since there is an inability to be purified from its effects, many rabbis forbid entrance into the Temple Mount altogether as a safeguard.

=== Opinions of contemporary rabbis concerning entry to the site ===
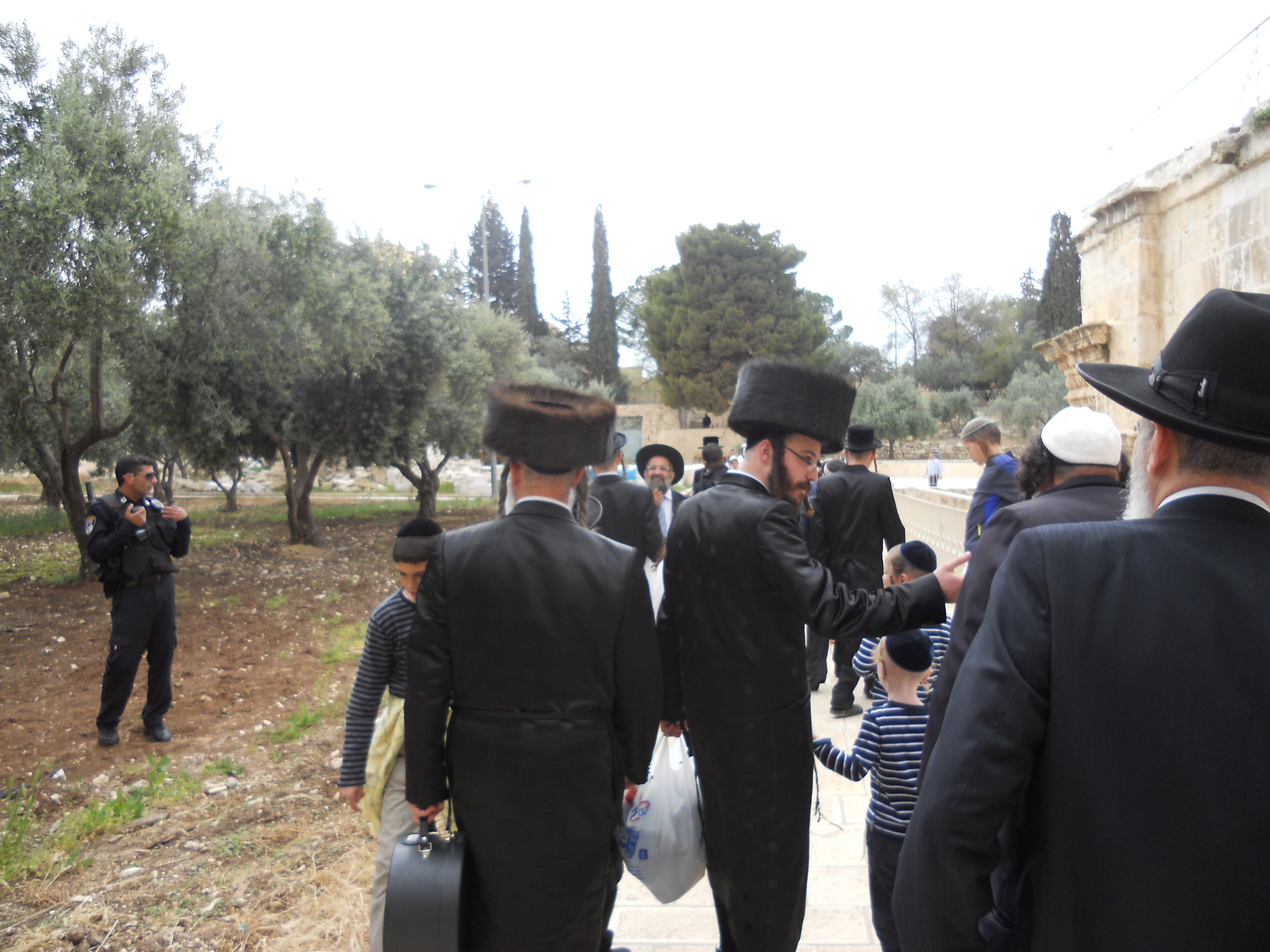
Haredi Jews visiting the Temple Mount during Passover

A few hours after the Temple Mount came under Israeli control during the Six-Day War, a message from the Chief Rabbis of Israel, Isser Yehuda Unterman and Yitzhak Nissim was broadcast, warning that Jews were not permitted to enter the site. This warning was reiterated by the Council of the Chief Rabbinate a few days later, which issued an explanation written by Rabbi Bezalel Jolti (Zolti) that "Since the sanctity of the site has never ended, it is forbidden to enter the Temple Mount until the Temple is built." The signatures of more than 300 prominent rabbis were later obtained.

A major critic of the decision of the Chief Rabbinate was Rabbi Shlomo Goren, the chief rabbi of the IDF. According to General Uzi Narkiss, who led the Israeli force that conquered the Temple Mount, Goren proposed to him that the Dome of the Rock be immediately blown up. After Narkiss refused, Goren unsuccessfully petitioned the government to close off the Mount to Jews and non-Jews alike. Later he established his office on the Mount and conducted a series of demonstrations on the Mount in support of the right of Jewish men to enter there. His behavior displeased the government, which restricted his public actions, censored his writings, and in August prevented him from attending the annual Oral Law Conference at which the question of access to the Mount was debated. Although there was considerable opposition, the conference consensus was to confirm the ban on entry to Jews. The ruling said "We have been warned, since time immemorial [lit. 'for generations and generations'], against entering the entire area of the Temple Mount and have indeed avoided doing so." According to Ron Hassner, the ruling "brilliantly" solved the government's problem of avoiding ethnic conflict, since those Jews who most respected rabbinical authority were those most likely to clash with Muslims on the Mount.

Rabbinical consensus in the post-1967 period, held that it is forbidden for Jews to enter any part of the Temple Mount, and in January 2005, a declaration was signed confirming the 1967 decision.

Most Haredi rabbis are of the opinion that the Mount is off limits to Jews and non-Jews alike. Their opinions against entering the Temple Mount are based on the current political climate surrounding the Mount, along with the potential danger of entering the hallowed area of the Temple courtyard and the impossibility of fulfilling the ritual requirement of cleansing oneself with the ashes of a red heifer. The boundaries of the areas which are completely forbidden, while having large portions in common, are delineated differently by various rabbinic authorities.

However, there is a growing body of Modern Orthodox and national religious rabbis who encourage visits to certain parts of the Mount, which they believe are permitted according to most medieval rabbinical authorities. These rabbis include: Shlomo Goren (former Ashkenazi Chief Rabbi of Israel); Chaim David Halevi (former Chief Rabbi of Tel Aviv and Yafo); Dov Lior (Rabbi of Kiryat Arba); Yosef Elboim; Yisrael Ariel; She'ar Yashuv Cohen (Chief Rabbi of Haifa); Yuval Sherlo (rosh yeshiva of the hesder yeshiva of Petah Tikva); Meir Kahane. One of them, Shlomo Goren, held that it is possible that Jews are even allowed to enter the heart of the Dome of the Rock in time of war, according to Jewish Law of Conquest. These authorities demand an attitude of veneration on the part of Jews ascending the Temple Mount, ablution in a mikveh prior to the ascent, and the wearing of non-leather shoes. Some rabbinic authorities are now of the opinion that it is imperative for Jews to ascend in order to halt the ongoing process of Islamization of the Temple Mount. Maimonides, perhaps the greatest codifier of Jewish Law, wrote in Laws of the Chosen House ch 7 Law 15 "One may bring a dead body in to the (lower sanctified areas of the) Temple Mount and there is no need to say that the ritually impure (from the dead) may enter there, because the dead body itself can enter". One who is ritually impure through direct or in-direct contact of the dead cannot walk in the higher sanctified areas. For those who are visibly Jewish, they have no choice, but to follow a peripheral route as it has become unofficially part of the status quo on the Mount. Many of these recent opinions rely on archaeological evidence.

In December 2013, the two Chief Rabbis of Israel, David Lau and Yitzhak Yosef, reiterated the ban on Jews entering the Temple Mount. They wrote, "In light of [those] neglecting [this ruling], we once again warn that nothing has changed and this strict prohibition remains in effect for the entire area [of the Temple Mount]". In November 2014, the Sephardic chief rabbi Yitzhak Yosef reiterated the point of view held by many rabbinic authorities that Jews should not visit the Mount.

On the occasion of an upsurge in Palestinian knifing attacks on Israelis, associated with fears that Israel was changing the status quo on the Mount, the Haredi newspaper Mishpacha ran a notification in Arabic asking, 'their cousins', Palestinians, to stop trying to murder members of their congregation, since they were vehemently opposed to ascending the Mount and consider such visits proscribed by Jewish law.

== Features ==
=== Courtyard ===
The large courtyard (sahn) can host more than 400,000 worshippers, making it one of the largest mosques in the world.

==== Upper platform ====
The upper platform surrounds the Dome of the Rock, beneath which lies the Well of Souls, originally accessible only by a narrow hole in the Sakhrah, the foundation stone on which the Dome of the Rock site and after which it is named, until the Crusaders dug a new entrance to the cave from the south. The platform is accessible via eight staircases, each of which is topped by a free-standing arcade known in Arabic as the qanatir or mawazin. The arcades were erected in different periods from the 10th to 15th centuries.

There is also a smaller domed building on the upper platform, to the east of the Dome of the Rock, known as the Dome of the Chain (Qubbat al-Sisila in Arabic). Its exact origin and purpose is uncertain but historical sources indicate it was built under the reign of Abd al-Malik, the same Umayyad caliph who built the Dome of the Rock. Two other small domes stand to the northwest of the Dome of the Rock. The Dome of the Ascension (Qubbat al-Miraj in Arabic) has an inscription with a date corresponding to 1201 CE. It may have been a former Crusader structure, possibly a baptistery, that was repurposed at this time, or it may be a structure that was built after Saladin's capture of the city and reused some Crusader-era materials, including its columns. Per its name, this dome commemorates the spot where, according to some, Muhammad ascended to heaven. The Dome of the Spirits or Dome of the Winds (Qubbat al-Arwah in Arabic) stands a little further north and is dated to the 16th century.

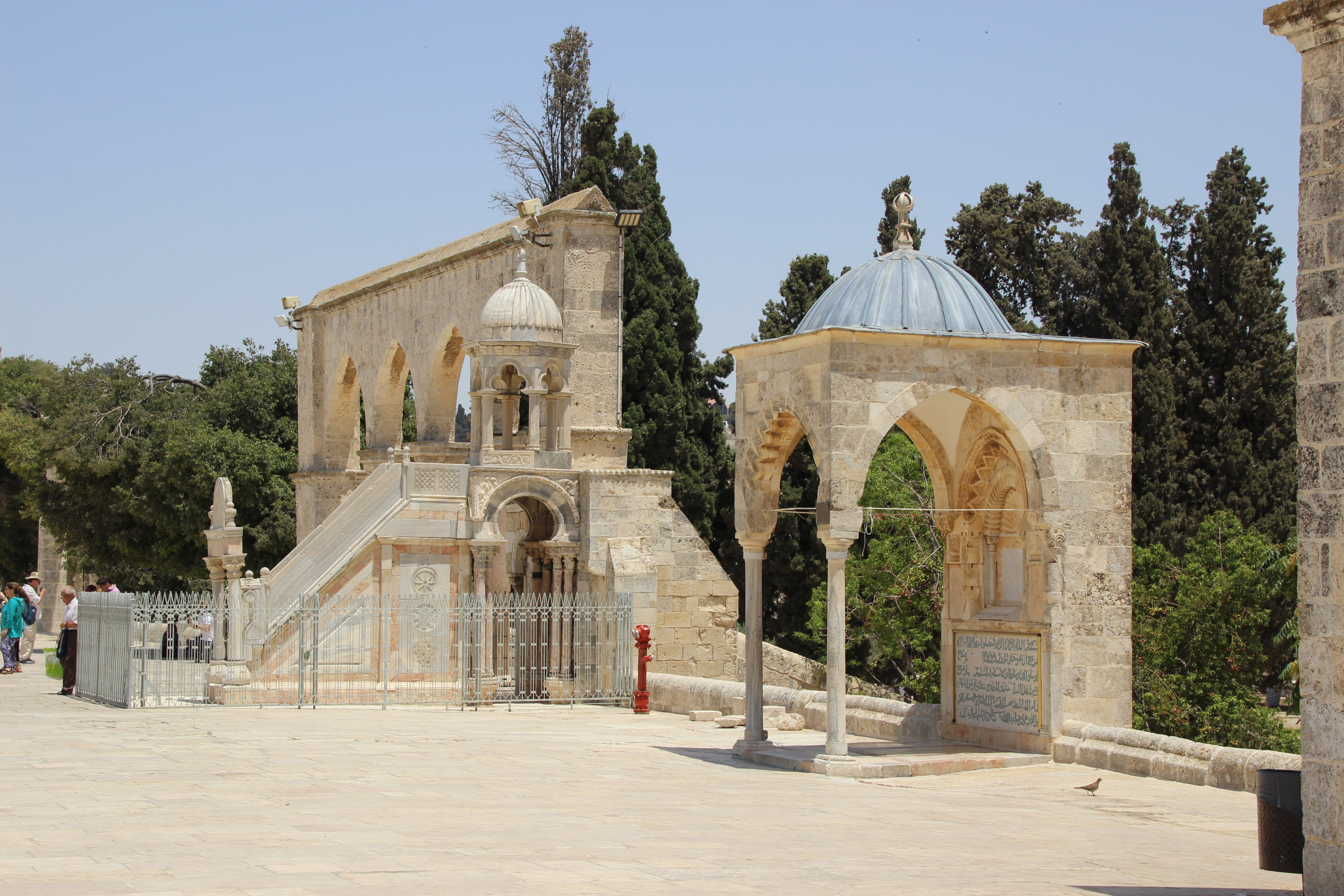
Southern edge of the upper platform, with view of the Summer Pulpit (left) and the southern qanatir behind it

In the southwest corner of the upper platform is a quadrangular structure which includes a portion topped by another dome. It is known as the Dome of Literature (Qubba Nahwiyya in Arabic) and dated to 1208. Standing further east, close to one of the southern entrance arcades, is a stone minbar known as the "Summer Pulpit" or Minbar of Burhan al-Din, used for open-air prayers. It appears to be an older ciborium from the Crusader period, as attested by its sculptural decoration, which was then reused under the Ayyubids. Sometime after 1345, a Mamluk judge named Burhan al-Din (d. 1388) restored it and added a stone staircase, giving it its present form.

==== Lower platform ====
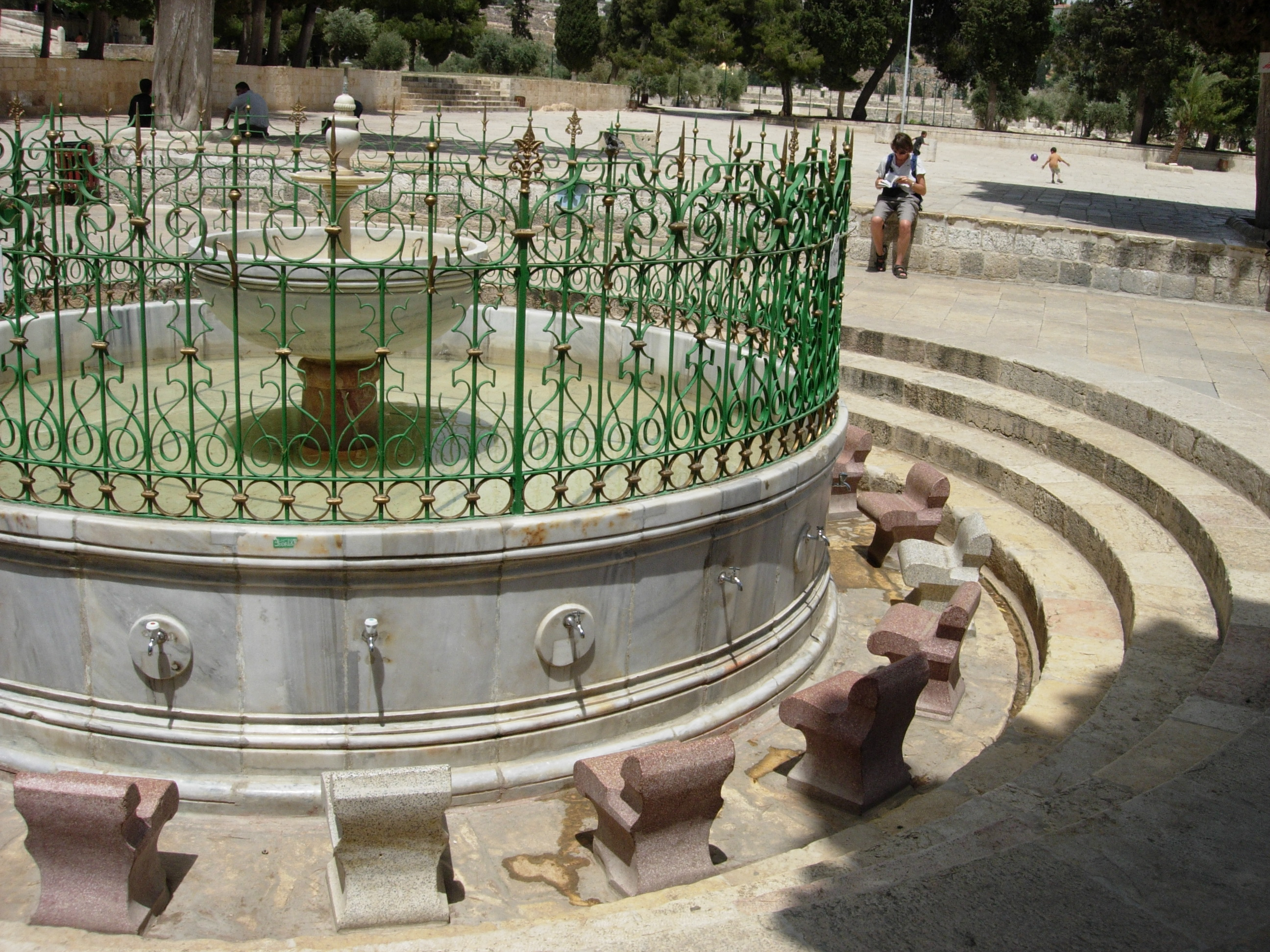
The al-Kas ablution fountain for Muslim worshippers on the southern portion of the lower platform

The lower platform – which constitutes most of the surface of the Temple Mount – has at its southern end al-Aqsa Mosque, which takes up most of the width of the Mount. Gardens take up the eastern and most of the northern side of the platform; the far north of the platform houses an Islamic school.

The lower platform also houses an ablution fountain (known as al-Kas), originally supplied with water via a long narrow aqueduct leading from the so-called Solomon's Pools near Bethlehem, but now supplied from Jerusalem's water mains.

There are several cisterns beneath the lower platform, designed to collect rainwater as a water supply. These have various forms and structures, seemingly built in different periods, ranging from vaulted chambers built in the gap between the bedrock and the platform, to chambers cut into the bedrock itself. Of these, the most notable are (numbering traditionally follows Wilson's scheme):

- Cistern 1 (located under the northern side of the upper platform). There is a speculation that it had a function connected with the altar of the Second Temple (and possibly of the earlier Temple), or with the bronze sea.
- Cistern 5 (located under the southeastern corner of the upper platform) – a long and narrow chamber, with a strange anti-clockwise curved section at its northwestern corner and containing within it a doorway currently blocked by earth. The cistern's position and design is such that there has been speculation it had a function connected with the altar of the Second Temple (and possibly of the earlier Temple), or with the bronze sea. Charles Warren thought that the altar of burnt offerings was located at the northwestern end.
- Cistern 8 (located just north of the al-Aqsa Mosque) – known as the Great Sea, a large rock hewn cavern, the roof supported by pillars carved from the rock; the chamber is particularly cave-like and atmospheric, and its maximum water capacity is several hundred thousand gallons.
- Cistern 9 (located just south of cistern 8, and directly under the al-Aqsa Mosque) – known as the Well of the Leaf due to its leaf-shaped plan, is also rock hewn.
- Cistern 11 (located east of cistern 9) – a set of vaulted rooms forming a plan shaped like the letter E. Probably the largest cistern, it has the potential to house over 700,000 gallons of water.
- Cistern 16/17 (located at the centre of the far northern end of the Temple Mount). Despite the currently narrow entrances, this cistern (17 and 16 are the same cistern) is a large, vaulted chamber, which Warren described as looking like the inside of the cathedral at Cordoba (which was previously a mosque). Warren believed that it was almost certainly built for some other purpose and was only adapted into a cistern at a later date; he suggested that it might have been part of a general vault supporting the northern side of the platform, in which case substantially more of the chamber exists than is used for a cistern.

=== Gates ===
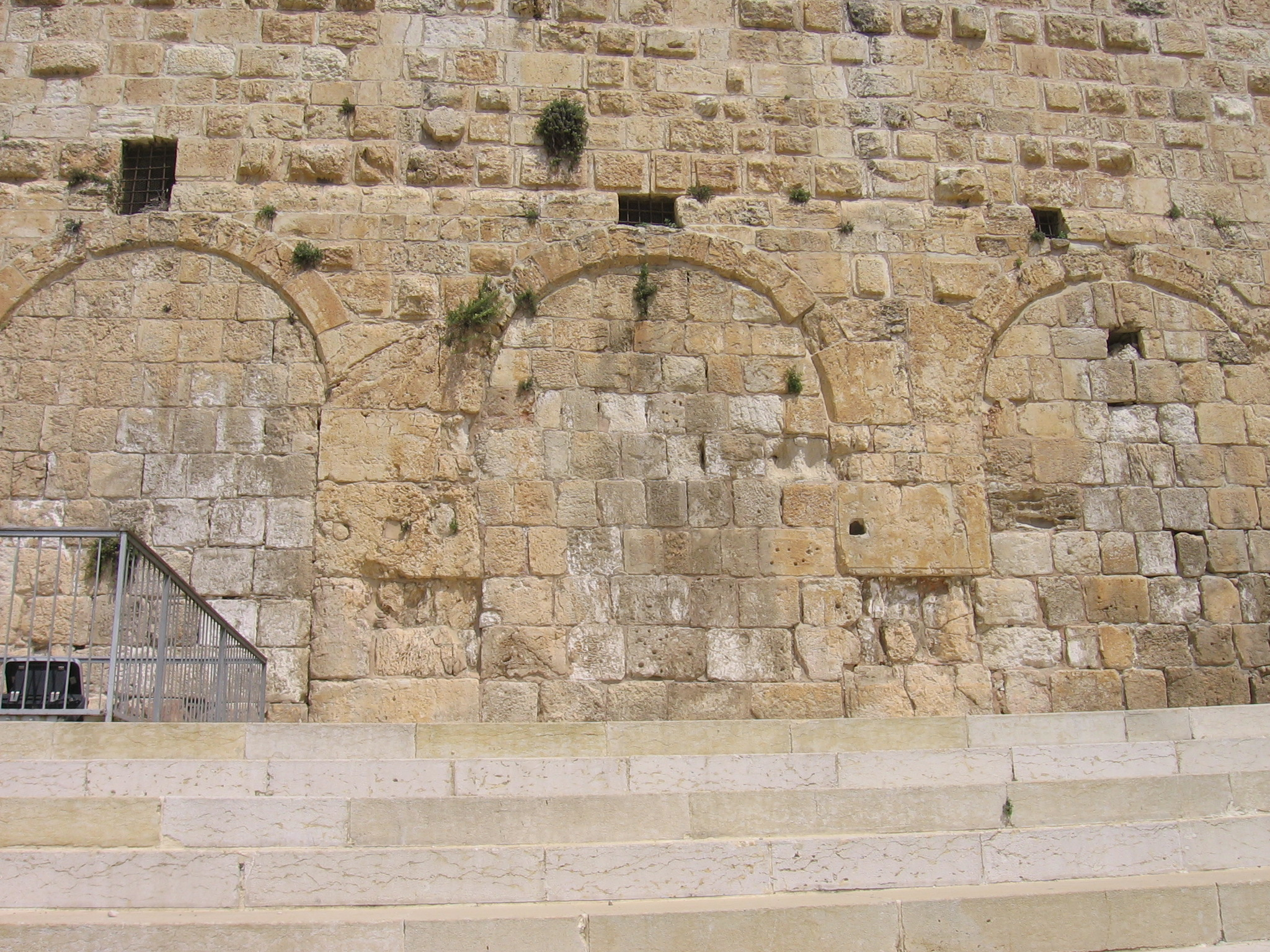
The eastern set of Hulda gates

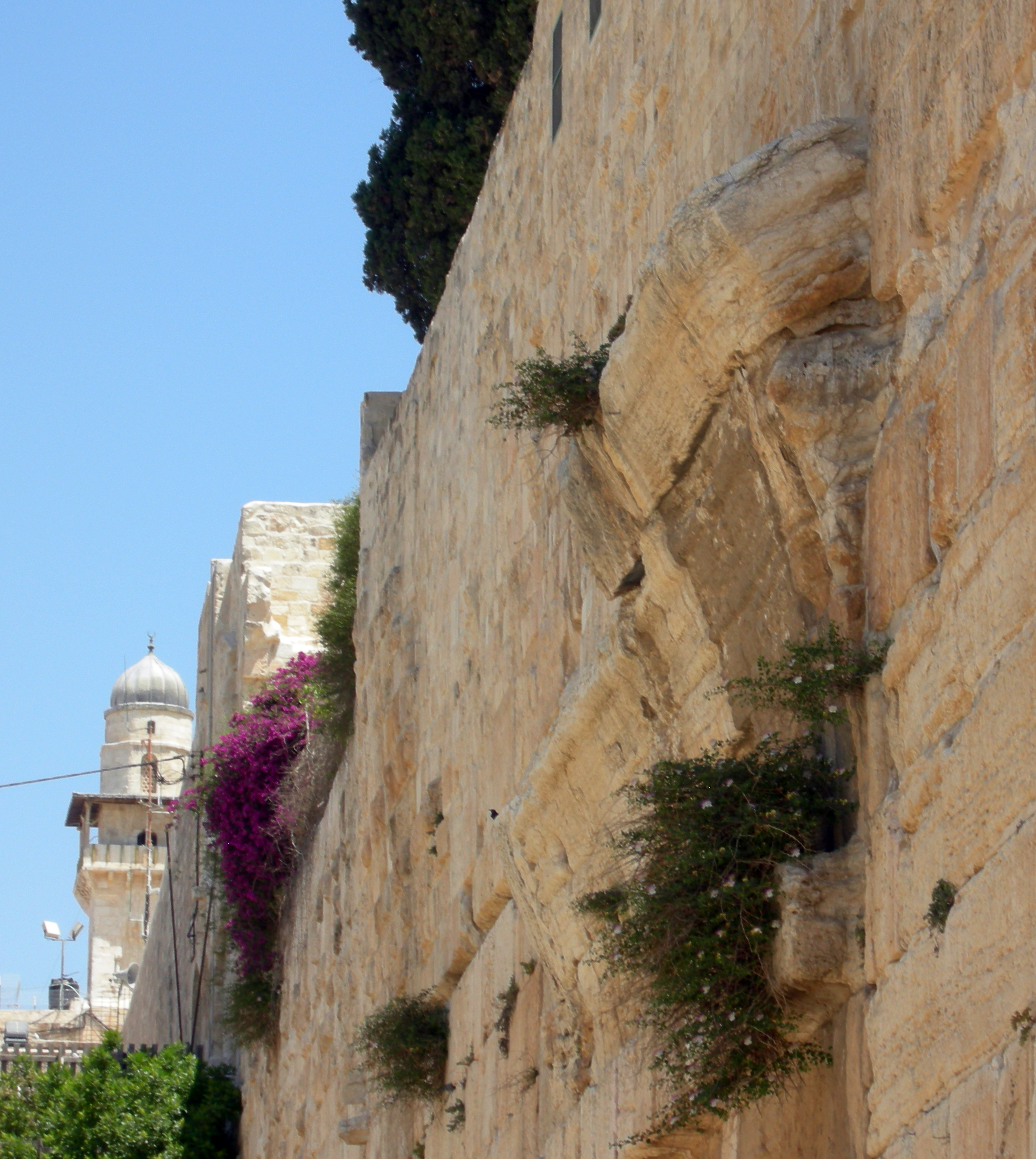
Robinson's Arch, situated on the southwestern flank, once supported a staircase that led to the Mount.

Sealed gates

The retaining walls of the platform contain several gateways, all now blocked. In the eastern wall is the Golden Gate, through which legend states the Jewish Messiah would enter Jerusalem. On the southern face are the Hulda Gates – the triple gate (which has three arches) and the double gate (which has two arches and is partly obscured by a Crusader building); these were the entrance and exit (respectively) to the Temple Mount from Ophel (the oldest part of Jerusalem), and the main access to the Mount for ordinary Jews. In the western face, near the southern corner, is the Barclay's Gate – only half visible due to a building (the "house of Abu Sa'ud") on the northern side. Also in the western face, hidden by later construction but visible via the recent Western Wall Tunnels, and only rediscovered by Warren, is Warren's Gate; the function of these western gates is obscure, but many Jews view Warren's Gate as particularly holy, due to its location due west of the Dome of the Rock. The current location of the Dome of the Rock is considered one of the possible locations where the Holy of Holies was placed; numerous alternative opinions exist, based on study and calculations, such as those of Tuvia Sagiv.

Warren was able to investigate the inside of these gates. Warren's Gate and the Golden Gate simply head toward the centre of the Mount, giving access to the surface by steps. Barclay's Gate is similar, but abruptly turns south as it does so; the reason for this is unknown. The double and triple gates (the Huldah Gates) are more substantial; heading into the Mount for some distance they each finally have steps rising to the surface just north of al-Aqsa Mosque. The passageway for each is vaulted, and has two aisles (in the case of the triple gate, a third aisle exists for a brief distance beyond the gate); the eastern aisle of the double gates and western aisle of the triple gates reach the surface, the other aisles terminating some way before the steps. Warren believed that one aisle of each original passage was extended when al-Aqsa Mosque blocked the original surface exits.

In the process of investigating Cistern 10, Warren discovered tunnels that lay under the Triple Gate passageway. These passages lead in erratic directions, some leading beyond the southern edge of the Temple Mount (they are at a depth below the base of the walls); their purpose is unknown – as is whether they predate the Temple Mount – a situation not helped by the fact that apart from Warren's expedition no one else is known to have visited them.

Altogether, there are six major sealed gates and a postern, listed here counterclockwise, dating from either the Roman/Herodian, Byzantine, or Early Muslim periods:

- Bab al-Jana'iz/al-Buraq (Gate of the Funerals/of al-Buraq); eastern wall; a hardly noticeable postern, or maybe an improvised gate, a short distance south of the Golden Gate
- Golden Gate (Bab al-Zahabi); eastern wall (northern third), a double gate:

Bab al-Rahma (Door of Mercy) is the southern opening,
Bab al-Tauba (Door of Repentance) is the northern opening

- Warren's Gate; western wall, now only visible from the Western Wall Tunnel
- Bab an-Nabi (Gate of the Prophet) or Barclay's Gate; western wall, visible from al-Buraq Mosque inside the Haram, and from the Western Wall plaza (women's section) and the adjacent building (the so-called house of Abu Sa'ud)
- Double Gate (Bab al-Thulathe; possibly one of the Huldah Gates); southern wall, underneath al-Aqsa Mosque
- Triple Gate; southern wall, outside Solomon's Stables/Marwani Mosque
- Single Gate; southern wall, outside Solomon's Stables/Marwani Mosque

Open gates of the Haram

There are now eleven open gates offering access to the Muslim Haram al-Sharif.

- Bab al-Asbat (Gate of the Tribes); north-east corner
- Bab al-Hitta/Huttah (Gate of Remission, Pardon, or Absolution); northern wall
- Bab al-Atim/'Atm/Attim (Gate of Darkness); northern wall
- Bab al-Ghawanima (Gate of Bani Ghanim); north-west corner
- Bab al-Majlis / an-Nazir/Nadhir (Council Gate / Inspector's Gate); western wall (northern third)
- Bab al-Hadid (Iron Gate); western wall (central part)
- Bab al-Qattanin (Gate of the Cotton Merchants); western wall (central part)
- Bab al-Matarah/Mathara (Ablution Gate); western wall (central part)

Two twin gates follow south of the Ablution Gate, the Tranquility Gate and the Gate of the Chain:

- Bab as-Salam / al-Sakina (Tranquility Gate / Gate of the Dwelling), the northern one of the two; western wall (central part)
- Bab as-Silsileh (Gate of the Chain), the southern one of the two; western wall (central part)
- Bab al-Magharbeh/Maghariba (Moroccans' Gate/Gate of the Moors); western wall (southern third); the only entrance for non-Muslims

A twelfth gate still open during Ottoman rule is now closed to the public:

- Bab as-Sarai (Gate of the Seraglio); a small gate to the former residence of the Pasha of Jerusalem; western wall, northern part (between the Bani Ghanim and Council gates).

=== Solomon's Stables/Marwani Mosque ===
East of and joined to the triple gate passageway is a large vaulted area, supporting the southeastern corner of the Temple Mount platform – which is substantially above the bedrock at this point – the vaulted chambers here are popularly referred to as Solomon's Stables. They were used as stables by the Crusaders, but were built by Herod the Great – along with the platform they were built to support.

=== Northern and western porticos ===
The complex is bordered on the south and east by the outer walls of the Old City of Jerusalem. On the north and west it is bordered by two long porticos (riwaq), built during the Mamluk period. A number of other structures were also built along these areas, mainly also from the Mamluk period. On the north side, they include the Isardiyya Madrasa, built before 1345, and the Almalikiyya Madrasa, dated to 1340. On the west side, they include the Ashrafiyya Madrasa, built by Sultan Qaytbay between 1480 and 1482, and the adjacent Uthmaniyya Madrasa, dated to 1437. The Sabil of Qaytbay, contemporary with the Ashrafiyya Madrasa, also stands nearby.

=== Minarets ===
The existing four minarets include three along the western perimeter of the esplanade and one along the northern wall. The earliest dated minaret was constructed on the northwest corner of the Temple Mount in 1298, with three other minarets added over the course of the 14th century.

== Archaeology, site alterations ==
Due to the extreme political sensitivity of the site, no real archaeological excavations have ever been conducted on the Temple Mount itself. Protests commonly occur whenever archaeologists conduct projects near the Mount. This sensitivity has not, however, protected both Jewish and Muslim works from accusations of destroying archeological evidence on a number of occasions. Aside from visual observation of surface features, most other archaeological knowledge of the site comes from the 19th-century survey carried out by Charles Wilson and Charles Warren and others. Since the Waqf is granted almost full autonomy on the Islamic holy sites, Israeli archaeologists have been prevented from inspecting the area, and are restricted to conducting excavations around the Temple Mount.

Southern Wall of Temple Mount, southwestern corner

After the Six-Day War of 1967, Israeli archeologists began a series of excavations near the site at the southern wall that uncovered finds from the Second Temple period through Roman, Umayyad and Crusader times. Israeli archaeological digs at the southwestern corner of Temple Mount discovered traces of four Muslim palaces built under the Umayyad Caliphate, though the remains have not been well preserved but instead had a museum built upon them. The former UN envoy to Jerusalem, Raymond M. Lemaire, criticised "the construction of a metallic pergola in the middle of the courtyard of one of the Umayyad palaces, which disfigures the site." Upon visiting Jerusalem in September 1999, medieval art historian Léon Pressouyre noted that the palaces had lost their archaeological features due to neglect, "for in the guise of highlighting the remains of previous periods [the Israeli authorities] trivialise the Umayyad palaces, major monuments in the area".

Over the period 1970–1988, a number of tunnels were excavated in the vicinity, including one that passed to the west of the Mount and became known as the Western Wall Tunnel, which was opened to the public in 1996. The same year the Waqf began construction of a new mosque in the structures known since Crusader times as Solomon's Stables. Many Israelis regarded this as a radical change of the status quo, which should not have been undertaken without first consulting the Israeli government. The project was done without attention to the possibility of disturbing historically significant archaeological material, with stone and ancient artifacts treated without regard to their preservation.

Israeli organizations such as the Committee to Prevent the Destruction of Antiquities on the Temple Mount argue that Palestinians are deliberately removing significant amounts of archaeological evidence about the Jewish past of the site and claim to have found significant artifacts in the fill removed by bulldozers and trucks from the Temple Mount. Since the late 1990s, the Temple Mount Sifting Project has been reclaiming earth from similar illegal excavations on the mount that had been dumped in the nearby Kidron Valley that had yielded important finds, including Iron Age figurines, an 8th or 7th centuries BCE clay sealing inscribed in Hebrew, Persian period YHD coins, Herodian opus sectile tiles, Byzantine tesserae, and arrowheads, mostly from the Crusader period.

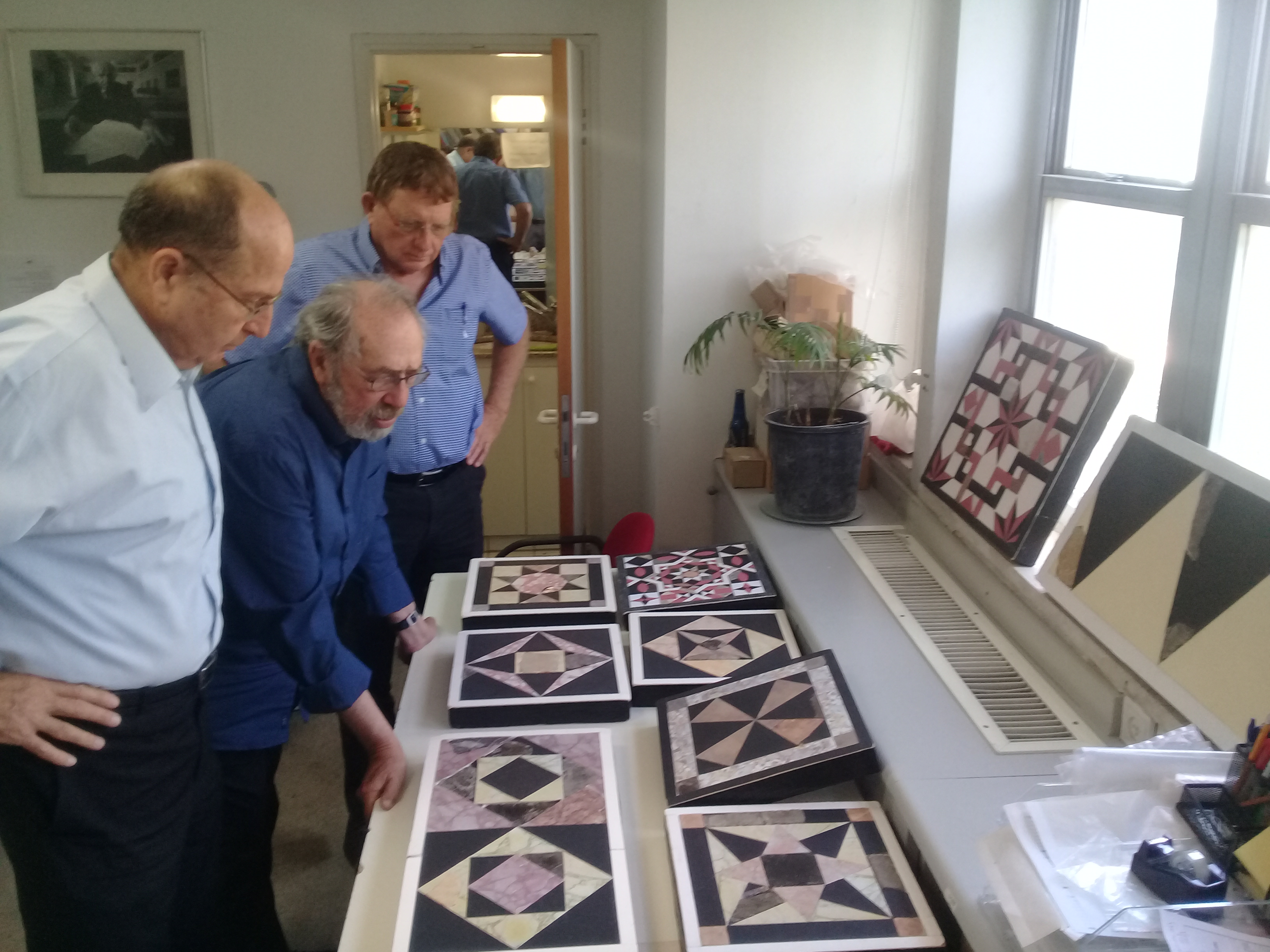
Gabriel Barkay presents Moshe Ya'alon with the reconstructions of the opus sectile floors of the Herodian period plaza

In late 2002, a bulge of about 700 mm (28 in) was reported in the southern retaining wall part of the Temple Mount. A Jordanian team of engineers recommended replacing or resetting most of the stones in the affected area. In February 2004, the eastern wall of the Mount was damaged by an earthquake. The damage threatened to topple sections of the wall into the area known as Solomon's Stables. A few days later, a portion of retaining wall, supporting the earthen ramp that led from the Western Wall plaza to the Gate of the Moors on the Temple Mount, collapsed. In 2007 the Israel Antiquities Authority started construction of a temporary wooden pedestrian pathway to replace the Mugrabi Gate ramp after a landslide in 2005 made it unsafe and in danger of collapse. The works sparked condemnation from Arab leaders.

In July 2007 the Waqf which administers the Mount began digging a 400-metre-long (1,300 ft), 1.5-metre-deep (4.9 ft) trench from the northern side of the Temple Mount compound to the Dome of the Rock in order to replace 40-year-old electric cables in the area. Israeli archaeologists accused the waqf of a deliberate act of cultural vandalism. Accusations of vandalism at the site resurfaced in 2018 and again in 2022.

== Noteworthy events ==
February 2004
Partially collapsed Mughrabi-Bridge: An 800-year-old wall holding back part of the hill jutting out from the Western Wall leading up to the Mughrabi Gate partially collapsed. Authorities believed a recent earthquake may have been responsible.

March 2005
Allah inscription: The word "Allah", in approximately a one-foot-tall (0.30 m) Arabic script, was found newly carved into the ancient stones, an act viewed by Jews as vandalism. The carving was attributed to a team of Jordanian engineers and Palestinian laborers in charge of strengthening that section of the wall. The discovery caused outrage among Israeli archaeologists and many Jews were angered by the inscription at Judaism's holiest site.

October 2006
Synagogue proposal: Uri Ariel, a member of the Knesset from the National Union party (a right-wing opposition party) ascended to the mount, and said that he is preparing a plan where a synagogue will be built on the mount. His proposed synagogue would not be built instead of the mosques but in a separate area in accordance with rulings of 'prominent rabbis.' He said he believed that this will be correcting a historical injustice and that it is an opportunity for the Muslim world to prove that it is tolerant to all faiths.

Minaret proposal: Plans are mooted to build a new minaret on the mount, the first of its kind for 600 years. King Abdullah II of Jordan announced a competition to design a fifth minaret for the walls of the Temple Mount complex. He said it would "reflect the Islamic significance and sanctity of the mosque". The scheme, estimated to cost $300,000, is for a seven-sided tower – after the seven-pointed Hashemite star – and at 42 metres (138 ft), it would be 3.5 metres (11 ft) taller than the next-largest minaret. The minaret would be constructed on the eastern wall of the Temple Mount near the Golden Gate.

February 2007
Mugrabi Gate ramp reconstruction: Repairs to an earthen ramp leading to the Mugrabi Gate sparked Arab protests.

May 2007
Right-wing Jews ascend the Mount: A group of right-wing Religious Zionist rabbis entered the Temple Mount. This elicited widespread criticism from other religious Jews and from secular Israelis, accusing the rabbis of provoking the Arabs. An editorial in the newspaper Haaretz accused the rabbis of 'knowingly and irresponsibly bringing a burning torch closer to the most flammable hill in the Middle East,' and noted that rabbinical consensus in both the Haredi and the Religious Zionist worlds forbids Jews from entering the Temple Mount. On May 16, Rabbi Avraham Shapira, former Ashkenazi Chief Rabbi of Israel and rosh yeshiva of the Mercaz HaRav yeshiva, reiterated his opinion that it is forbidden for Jews to enter the Temple Mount. The Litvish Haredi newspaper Yated Ne'eman, which is controlled by leading Litvish Haredi rabbis including Rabbi Yosef Shalom Eliashiv and Rabbi Nissim Karelitz, accused the rabbis of transgressing a decree punishable by 'death through the hands of heaven.'

July 2007
Temple Mount cable replacement: The Waqf began digging a ditch from the northern side of the Temple Mount compound to the Dome of the Rock as a prelude to infrastructure work in the area. Although the dig was approved by the police, it generated protests from archaeologists.

October 2009
Clashes: Palestinian protesters gathered at the site after rumours that an extreme Israeli group would harm the site, which the Israeli government denied. Israeli police assembled at the Temple Mount complex to disperse Palestinian protesters who were throwing stones at them. The police used stun grenades on the protesters, of which 15 were later arrested, including the Palestinian President's adviser on Jerusalem affairs. Eighteen Palestinians and 3 police officers were injured.

July 2010
A public opinion poll in Israel showed that 49% of Israelis want the Temple to be rebuilt, with 27% saying the government should make active steps towards such reconstruction. The poll was conducted by channel 99, the government-owned Knesset channel, in advance of the ninth day of the Hebrew month of Av, on which Jews commemorate the destruction of both the first and second Temples, which stood at this site.

Knesset Member Danny Danon visited the Temple Mount in accordance with rabbinical views of Jewish Law on the ninth of the Hebrew Month of Av. The Knesset member condemned the conditions imposed by Muslims upon religious Jews at the site and vowed to work to improve conditions.

July 2017
Temple Mount shooting: Three men from the Israeli-Arab city of Umm al-Fahm opened fire on two Israeli Druze policemen at the Lions' Gate. Gun attacks have been unusual at the Temple Mount in recent decades.

Following the July 14 attack, the site was shut down, and reopened on July 16 with metal detector-equipped checkpoints, spurring calls for protests by Muslim leaders associated with the site.

April 2022
Al-Aqsa Mosque clashes: On 15 April 2022, clashes erupted between Palestinians and Israeli Security Forces on the Temple Mount. The clashes began when Palestinians threw stones, firecrackers, and other heavy objects at Israeli police officers. The policemen responded with various riot control measures. Some Palestinians then barricaded themselves inside al-Aqsa Mosque and continued throwing stones at the policemen. In response, police raided the mosque, arresting those who had barricaded themselves inside. Some damage was done to the mosque's structure.

April 2023
Al-Aqsa Mosque clashes

December 2025

Archaeologists in Jerusalem uncovered a 1,300-year-old lead pendant bearing a seven-branched menorah near the southwestern corner of the Temple Mount, during digs in the Davidson Archaeological Park.

The object is almost pure lead with menorahs on both sides, and is only the second known pendant of its kind, the other held in Baltimore.

It dates to the Late Byzantine period, when Jews were formally banned from Jerusalem, yet its presence suggests some still visited or maintained ties to the city.

Researchers think it served as a personal amulet symbolizing Jewish identity, not simple jewelry, and its discovery at the foot of the Temple Mount reinforces the enduring Jewish historical and spiritual connection to the site.

== Panorama ==
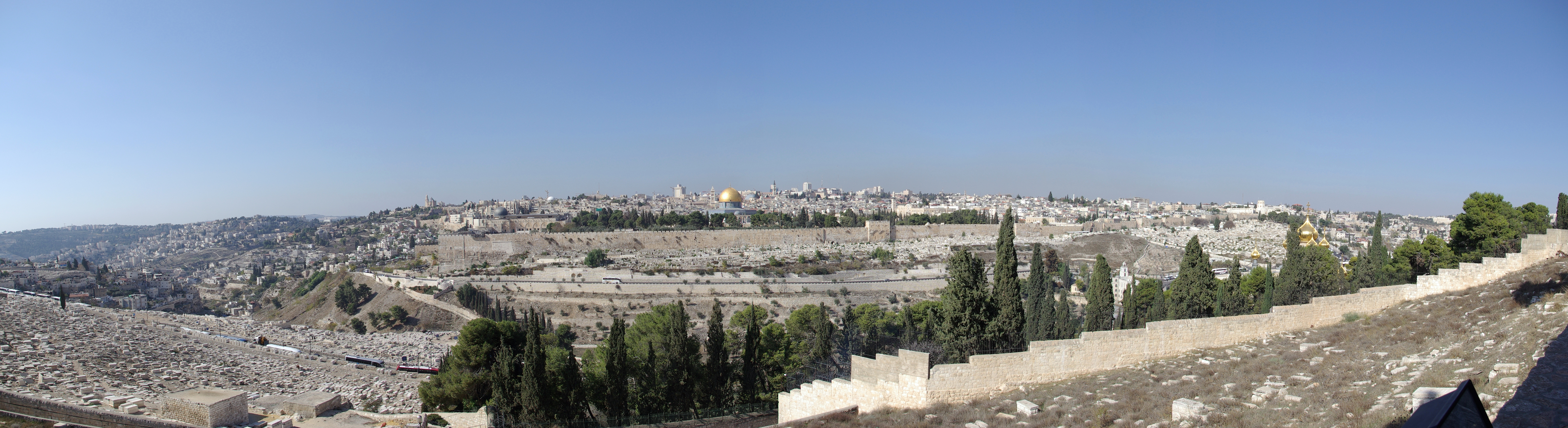
Panorama of the Temple Mount, seen from the Mount of Olives

== See also ==
- List of national symbols of Palestine
- Committee for the Prevention of Destruction of Antiquities on the Temple Mount
- HALIBA, Israeli organization supporting Jewish free access and worship rights on the Temple Mount
- Hashemite custodianship of Jerusalem holy sites
- Jerusalem in Judaism
- As-Sirāt, in Islam, the narrow bridge for the souls on the Day of Judgment
- Temple Mount Sifting Project
