= Excavations at the Temple Mount =

Archaeology of a Jerusalem holy site

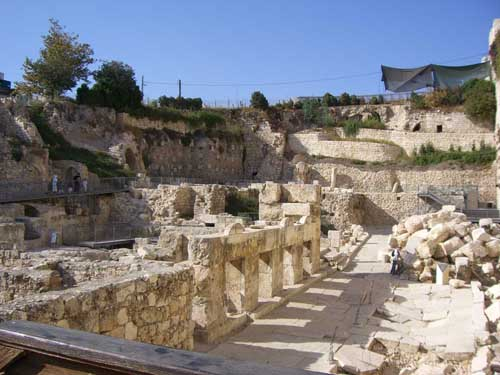
Excavations adjacent to Robinson's Arch

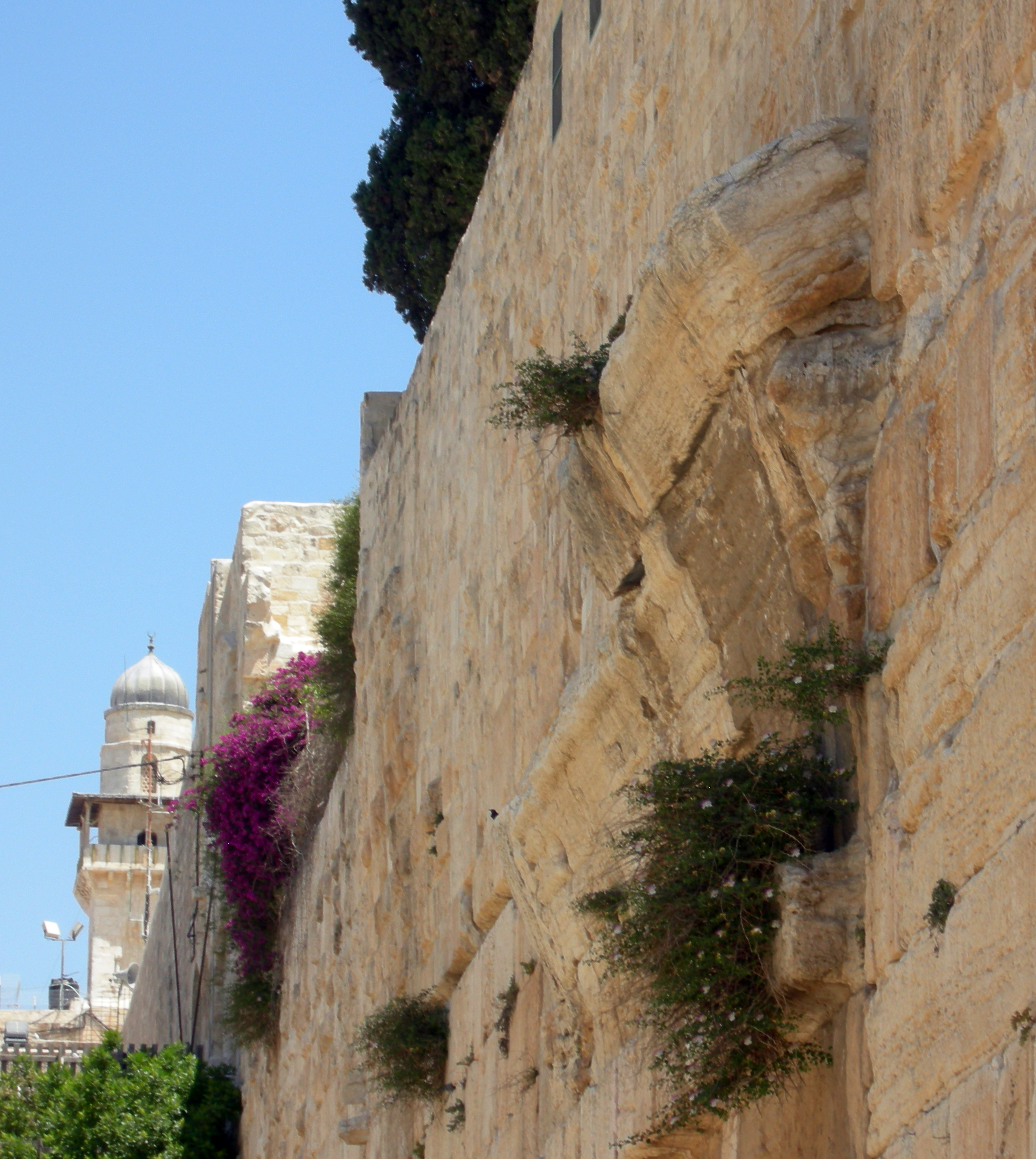
Robinson's Arch: the springers are still jutting out of the Western Wall

A number of archaeological excavations at the Temple Mount— contentious religious site in the Old City of Jerusalem—have taken place over the last 150 years. Excavations in the area represent one of the more sensitive areas of all archaeological excavations in Jerusalem.

The term Temple Mount usually refers to the artificially expanded platform at the top of the natural hill and the compound situated there. The compound is delineated by four ancient retaining walls, and is of high religious significance. The compound itself has only very rarely been the object of archaeological work, unlike the area surrounding it, which has been quite intensively excavated, especially along the southern and western walls.

The first archaeological work was undertaken by the British Royal Engineers in the 1860s in the Ordnance Survey of Jerusalem and subsequently the PEF Survey of Palestine.

Since Israel took control of the Old City in 1967, archaeological excavations in the vicinity of the Mount have been undertaken by Israel. Any type of earthmoving work inside the compound however, has mainly been reserved to the Jordanian/Palestinian-led Jerusalem Islamic Waqf, the Muslim authority in charge of the Al-Aqsa compound, who employs its own archaeologist and who at times has applied for the services of Jordanian and Egyptian restoration specialists. Work done by both sides has been controversial and criticized. Israeli and Jewish groups have criticized excavations conducted by the Waqf, with the Muslim side criticizing work done by the Israeli side. International organizations, such as UNESCO, sometimes intervene in the conflicts.

== History of archaeological work and reactions to it ==
Due to the extreme political sensitivity of the site, few archaeological excavations have been conducted on the Temple Mount itself. Protests commonly occur whenever archaeologists conduct projects on or near the Mount.

For actual finds from the surveys and digs inside the compound and listed in this section, please see the next section, Finds from the compound.

=== PEF work in- and outside the compound ===
Aside from visual observation of surface features, most other archaeological knowledge of the site comes from the 19th-century survey carried out by Charles Wilson (Ordnance Survey of Jerusalem) and Charles Warren (PEF Survey of Palestine). Warren was one of the first to excavate this area, exemplifying a new era of Biblical archaeology in the 1870s. His exploration was under the auspices of the Palestine Exploration Fund, a society with a relationship with the Corps of Royal Engineers. The group was conducting a study and survey of the Levant region, including the southern part, Palestine. Warren and his team improved the topographic map of Jerusalem and discovered the ancient water systems that lay beneath the city of Jerusalem.

=== Mandate-time work inside the compound ===
During the 1930s, repairs being made to the al-Aqsa mosque enabled Robert Hamilton to examine parts of the structure usually hidden, including below the floor.

=== Post-1967 ===
==== Work outside the compound ====
In 1967 the Religious Affairs Ministry began an unlicensed excavation. Starting at the Western Wall Plaza, workers dug northward, under the Old City's Muslim Quarter.

Beginning in 1968, Israeli archaeologists began excavations at the foot of the Temple Mount, immediately south of the al-Aqsa Mosque, uncovering Roman, Umayyad and Crusader remains.

In 1970, Israeli authorities commenced intensive excavations to the south and west of the compound. Over the period 1970–1988, the Israeli authorities excavated a tunnel passing along the western wall of the Temple Mount, northwards from the prayer plaza of the Western Wall, that became known as the Western Wall Tunnel. They sometimes used mechanical excavators under the supervision of archaeologists. Palestinians claim that both of these have caused cracks and structural weakening of the buildings in the Muslim Quarter of the city above. Israelis confirmed this danger:

"The Moslem authorities were concerned about the ministry tunnel along the Temple Mount wall, and not without cause. Two incidents during the Mazar dig along the southern wall had sounded alarm bells. Technion engineers had already measured a slight movement in part of the southern wall during the excavations. ... There was no penetration of the Mount itself or danger to holy places, but midway in the tunnel's progress large cracks appeared in one of the residential buildings in the Moslem Quarter, 12 meters above the excavation. The dig was halted until steel buttresses secured the building."

In an article published in the Egyptian Al-Ahram Weekly in 2007, Palestinian journalist Khaled Amayreh listed Israeli encroachments on the Al-Aqsa Mosque: In 1977, digging continued and a large ancient tunnel was opened below the women's prayer area. A further tunnel was unearthed under the mosque, going from east to west, in 1979. Amayreh further claimed that in March 1984, the Archaeological Department of the Israeli Ministry of Religious Affairs dug a tunnel near the western portion of the mosque, endangering the Islamic "Majlis" or council building. Writing in 1991, Israeli archaeologist Israel Finkelstein denied the claims, asserting that "the closest excavation to the mosque is some 70 meters to its south".

==== 1981 breach of Warren's Gate ====
In 1981, Yehuda Meir Getz, rabbi of the Western Wall, had workmen clear the debris from the gateway of the ancient Warren's Gate. There were allegations the intention of this excavation was to access the innards of the Temple Mount itself from the Western Wall Tunnel. Arabs on the Mount heard banging from one of the more than two dozen cisterns on the Mount. Israeli Government officials, upon being notified of the unauthorized breach, immediately ordered Warren's Gate sealed. The 2,000-year-old stone gate was filled with cement, and remains cemented shut today.

==== Mutual accusation of destruction, neglect ====
Archaeologist Léon Pressouyre, a UNESCO envoy who visited the site in 1998 and claims to have been prevented from meeting Israeli officials (in his own words, "Mr Avi Shoket, Israel's permanent delegate to UNESCO, had repeatedly opposed my mission and, when I expressed the wish to meet with his successor, Uri Gabay, I was denied an appointment"), accuses the Israeli government of culpably neglecting to protect the Islamic period buildings uncovered in Israeli excavations. Later, Prof. Oleg Grabar of the Institute for Advanced Study in Princeton replaced Leon Pressouyre as the UNESCO envoy to investigate the Israeli allegations that antiquities are being destroyed by the Waqf on the Temple Mount. Initially, Grabar was denied access to the buildings by Israel for over a year, allegedly due to the threat of violence resulting from the al-Aqsa Intifada. His eventual conclusion was that the monuments are deteriorating largely because of conflicts over who is responsible for them, the Jordanian government, the local Palestinian Authority or the Israeli government.

=== Western Wall Tunnel (1996) ===
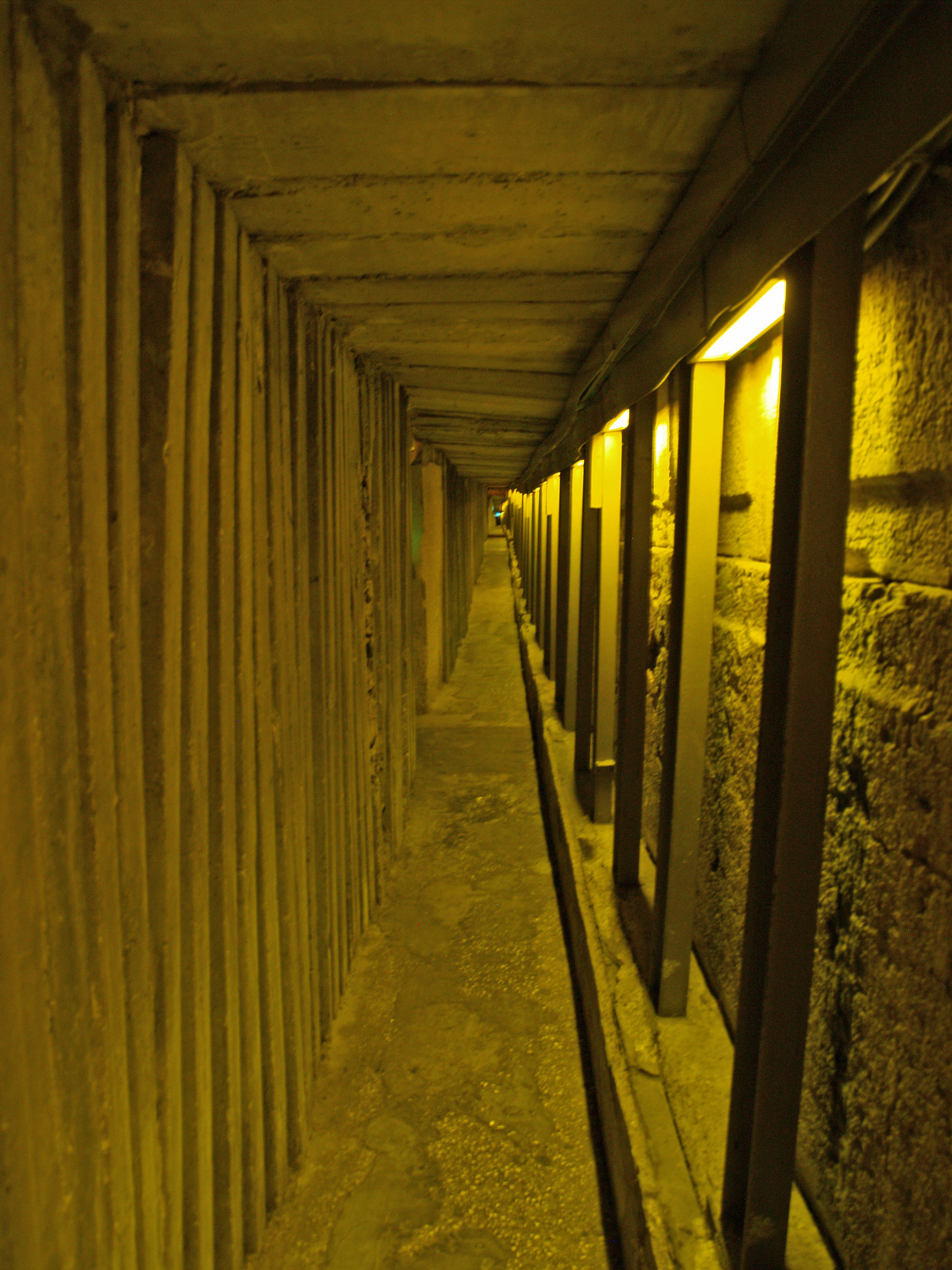
Concrete supports in the tunnel.

After the Six-Day War, the Ministry of Religious Affairs of Israel began the excavations aimed at exposing the continuation of the Western Wall. The excavations lasted almost twenty years and revealed many previously unknown facts about the history and geography of the Temple Mount.

The tunnel exposes a total length of 500 m (a third of a mile) of the wall, revealing the methods of construction and the various activities in the vicinity of the Temple Mount. The excavations included many archaeological finds along the way, including discoveries from the Herodian period (streets, monumental masonry), sections of a reconstruction of the Western Wall dating to the Umayyad period, and various structures dating to the Ayyubid, Mamluk, and Hasmonean periods constructed to support buildings in the vicinity of the Temple Mount. Warren's Gate lies about 150 feet (46 m) into the tunnel. At the northern portion of the Western Wall, remains of a water channel, which originally supplied water to the Temple Mount, were found. The exact source of the channel is unknown, though it passes through an underground pool known as the Strouthion Pool. The water channel was dated to the Hasmonean period and was accordingly dubbed the Hasmonean Channel.

The biggest stone in the Western Wall often called the Western Stone is also revealed within the tunnel and ranks as one of the heaviest objects ever lifted by human beings without powered machinery. The stone has a length of 41 feet (12 meters) and an estimated width between 11.5 and 15 ft (3.5 and 4.6 meters) Estimates place its weight at 550 metric tons.

In 1996, Israeli Prime Minister Binyamin Netanyahu opened the Western Wall Tunnel near the site. Fueled by the allegation that the tunnel would undermine the Temple Mount, Palestinians protested. Consequently, gun battles in the West Bank and Gaza Strip killed 54 Palestinians and 14 Israeli soldiers.

==== Construction at Solomon's Stables (1996–1999) ====
In 1996 the Waqf began unauthorized construction in the structures known since Crusader times as Solomon's Stables, and in the Eastern Hulda Triple Gate passageway, allowing the area to be (re)opened as a prayer space called the Marwani Musalla, capable of accommodating 7,000 people. In 1997, the Western Hulda Double Gate passageway was converted into another mosque.

According to The New York Times, an emergency exit had been urged upon the Waqf by the Israeli police. In 1999, the Waqf agreed on its necessity, which was also acknowledged by the Israel Antiquities Authority (IAA). But the IAA criticized the Waqf's use of bulldozers, and said that salvation archaeology needed to be performed first. Gabriel Barkay, an Israeli archaeology professor, said the construction demolished Crusader structures dating to the twelfth century, and went on without archaeological supervision. He said the workers used ancient stones from early Jewish structures in order to build modern ones. Israel Finkelstein has described the project as "the greatest devastation to have recently been inflicted on Jerusalem's archaeological heritage".

In 2000, an Israeli high court rejected a petition to halt construction, saying the matter should be left to the Israeli government. Ehud Olmert, then mayor of Jerusalem, also criticized the construction. He ordered a halt to the construction, on grounds of archaeological damage, defying an Israeli government decision to allow excavations at the site. The Waqf rejected that Israel had any right to halt the construction. Formally, the Waqf does not recognize Israeli authority, though it had cooperated with Israel until the 1996 opening of Western Wall tunnel (see above).

The Temple Mount Sifting Project is an archaeological project established in 2005 and dedicated to recovering archaeological artifacts from the 300 truckloads of topsoil removed from the Temple Mount by the Waqf during the construction of the underground el-Marwani Mosque from 1996 to 1999. For the items recovered, see below in the "Findings from the compound" section and the Sifting Project article.

==== Southern wall bulge (2002–2004) ====
In 2002, a bulge of about 27 inches (69 cm) was reported in the southern retaining wall part of the Temple Mount. Archaeologists suspected Waqf excavations for a new mosque, using industrial diggers and heavy machinery, had weakened the stability of the southern Wall. It was feared that part of the wall could seriously deteriorate or even collapse. The Waqf would not permit detailed Israeli inspection but came to an agreement with Israel that led to a team of Jordanian engineers inspecting the wall in October. They recommended repair work that involved replacing or resetting most of the stones in the affected area, which covers 2,000 square feet (190 square metres) and is located 25 feet (7.6 m) from the top of the wall. Repairs were completed before January 2004. The restoration of 250 square meters of wall cost 100,000 Jordanian dinars ($140,000).

==== Eastern wall damage (2004) ====
On February 11, 2004, the eastern wall of the Temple Mount was damaged by an earthquake. The damage threatens to topple sections of the wall into the area known as Solomon's Stables.

==== Mughrabi Gate ramp collapse (2004) ====
It is believed that on February 14, 2004, days after the earthquake, a winter storm destroyed the stone walkway leading from the Western Wall plaza to the Mughrabi Gate on the Temple Mount. Islamic Educational, Scientific and Cultural Organization (ISESCO) condemned the "excavations carried out by the Israeli occupying authorities under the Aqsa Mosque" which they claimed caused the collapse of the path.

==== Vandalism (2005) ====
In March 2005, the word "Allah" in foot-tall Arabic script was found newly carved into the ancient stones of the Temple Mount, about thirty feet off the ground. The act was viewed by Jews and archaeologists as vandalism. The graffiti on their holiest site caused great offense to Jews. The carving was attributed to the team of Jordanian engineers and Palestinian laborers in charge of strengthening that section of the wall.

==== Mughrabi Gate ramp replaced by a bridge (2007–) ====
After a landslide in 2004 left the earthen ramp leading to the politically sensitive access point known as the Mughrabi Gate unsafe and in danger of collapse, the Israel Antiquities Authority started work on the construction of a temporary wooden pedestrian pathway to the Temple Mount. Muslim officials accused Israel of designs on the foundations of Al Aqsa mosque. Ismail Haniyeh—then Prime Minister of the Palestinian National Authority and Hamas leader—called on Palestinians to unite to protest the excavations, while Fatah said they would end their ceasefire with Israel. The excavations provoked anger throughout the Islamic world. The Kingdom of Saudi Arabia called on the international community to stop the dig: "Israel's actions violate the mosque's sacred nature and risk destroying its religious and Islamic features." Syria condemned Israel's excavations, saying they "pose a threat against the Islamic and Christian holy sites in Jerusalem." Malaysia condemned Israel for the excavation works around and beneath the Al-Aqsa Mosque and for willfully destroying religious, cultural and heritage sites. King Abdullah II of Jordan "strongly condemned the Israeli actions against worshipers at Al Aqsa Mosque, stressing that Jordan would continue its contacts with the Arab and Islamic worlds and the international community to halt Israel's excavation work in the area". The secretary-general of the 57-member Organisation of the Islamic Conference, Ekmeleddin Ihsanoglu, expressed his anguish and dismay at the world's silence on Israel's "blatant moves to Judaize Jerusalem and change the holy city's historic character." He said "the excavation work being carried out by Israel constituted the gravest threat ever to one of Islam's three holiest mosques."

Israel denied all charges, calling them "ludicrous". As a result of the furor, Israeli authorities installed cameras to film excavation work being carried out near the Al-Aqsa Mosque. The footage was broadcast live on the Internet, in an attempt to ease widespread anger in the Muslim world.

A March 2007 UNESCO report on the incident cleared the Israeli team of wrongdoing, saying that the excavations "concern areas external to the Western Wall and are limited to the surface of the pathway and its northern side. ... [N]o work is being conducted inside the Haram es-Sharif, nor may the nature of the works underway be reported, at this stage, as constituting a threat to the stability of the Western Wall and the Al-Aqsa Mosque. The work area ends at approximately 10 metres distance from the Western Wall. It is conducted with light equipment, picks and shovels, and it is supervised and documented according to professional standards." The report nonetheless advised the cessation of work, as the aims of gathering information had been met, and consultation with concerned parties. On March 20, 2007, the Turkish Government sent a technical team to inspect and report on the excavations to the Turkish Prime Minister Recep Tayyip Erdoğan.

==== Infrastructure trench inside compound (2007) ====
In July 2007 the Waqf began digging a 400-metre-long, 1.5-metre-deep trench from the northern side of the Temple Mount compound to the Dome of the Rock in order to replace 40-year-old electric cables in the area. The dig, carried out by the Jerusalem Electricity Company, was approved by the Israeli police, but the Israel Antiquities Authority declined to comment whether it had approved the excavations. Israeli archaeologists accused the Waqf of a deliberate act of cultural vandalism. The Committee for the Prevention of Destruction of Antiquities on the Temple Mount criticized the use of a tractor for excavation at the Temple Mount "without real, professional and careful archaeological supervision involving meticulous documentation". Israeli Archaeologist Eilat Mazar said: "There is disappointment at the turning of a blind eye and the ongoing contempt for the tremendous archaeological importance of the Temple Mount ...", "... Using heavy machinery and with little documentation, can damage ancient relics and erase evidence of the presence of the biblical structures. Any excavation, even if for technical reasons, must be documented, photographed and the dirt sifted for any remains of relics." Dr. Gabriel Barkay slammed the way the excavations were being carried out stating that "They should be using a toothbrush, not a bulldozer". He maintains that "some man-worked stones have been found in the trench ... as well as remnants of a wall that, according to all our estimations, are from a structure in one of the outer courtyards in the Holy Temple." Archaeologist Zachi Zweig said a tractor used to dig the trench damaged the foundation of a 7-yard-wide wall "that might have been a remnant of the Second Temple."

The Grand Mufti of Jerusalem, Muhammad Ahmad Hussein, rejected the Israeli charges. "We don't harm the antiquities, we are the ones who are taking care of the antiquities, unlike others who destroy them." Yusuf Natsheh of the Islamic Waqf dismissed the claims, saying "the area has been dug many times" and argued that "remains unearthed would be from the 16th or 17th century Ottoman period". He said that the work was urgently needed to maintain the al-Aqsa compound as an important religious institution. "We regret some Israeli groups try to use archaeology to achieve political ends, but their rules of archaeology do not apply to the Haram; it is a living religious site in an occupied land."

In September 2007, the Orthodox Union condemned Waqf excavations on the Temple Mount. The Anti-Defamation League's Abraham Foxman said work on the Temple Mount must stop immediately. "We are especially concerned because there is a history of Muslim religious leaders treating Israeli religious and cultural artifacts on the Temple Mount, not to mention the Jewish connection to Jerusalem, with contempt".

== Finds from the compound ==
=== Charles Warren: water system ===
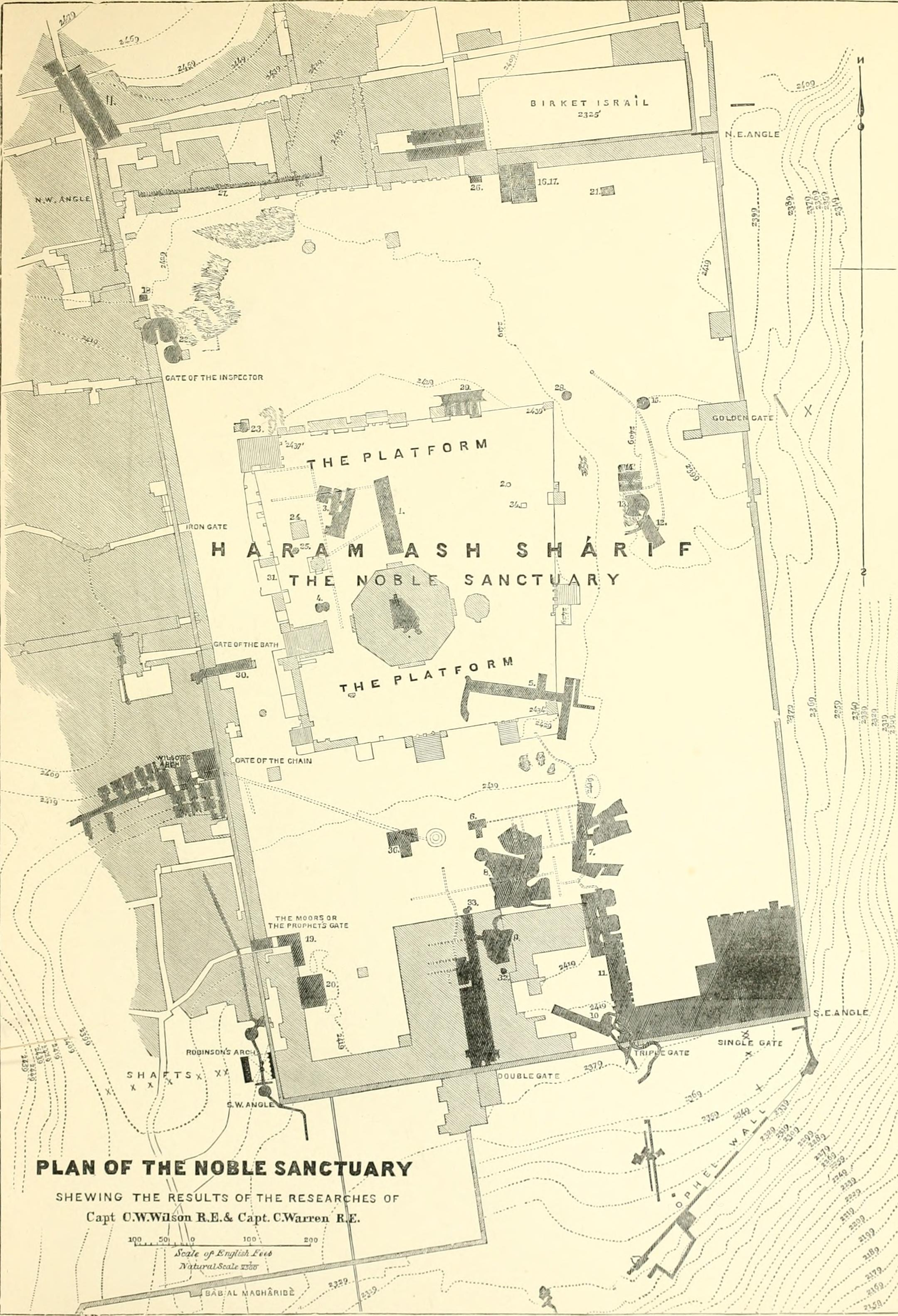
Plan of The Noble Sanctuary (Haram al-Sharif) from "The survey of Western Palestine-Jerusalem" by Charles Warren

Charles Warren and his team, while working for the Palestine Exploration Fund's Survey of Palestine, discovered the water systems of ancient Jerusalem and added them to his improved topographic map of the city.

=== Mandate era discoveries by Robert Hamilton ===
Between 1938 and 1942, Robert Hamilton, director of the British Mandate Antiquities Department, carried out the only excavation undertaken at the Aqsa Mosque during the Mandate. Hamilton uncovered portions of a multicolor mosaic floor with geometric patterns, but did not publish them. The date of the mosaic is disputed: Zachi Dvira considers that they are from the pre-Islamic Byzantine period, while Baruch, Reich and Sandhaus favor a much later Umayyad origin on account of their similarity to a mosaic from an Umayyad palace excavated adjacent to the Temple Mount's southern wall. By comparing the photographs to Hamilton's excavation report, Di Cesare determined that they belong to the second phase of mosque construction in the Umayyad period. Moreover, the mosaic designs were common in Islamic, Jewish and Christian buildings from the 2nd to the 8th century. Di Cesare suggested that Hamilton didn't include the mosaics in his book because they were destroyed to explore beneath them. Hamilton also uncovered a slab with the relief image of a centaur, dated to the 3rd century CE, believed to be a vestige of the Late Roman temple of Jupiter Capitolinus built on the Temple Mount after 135.

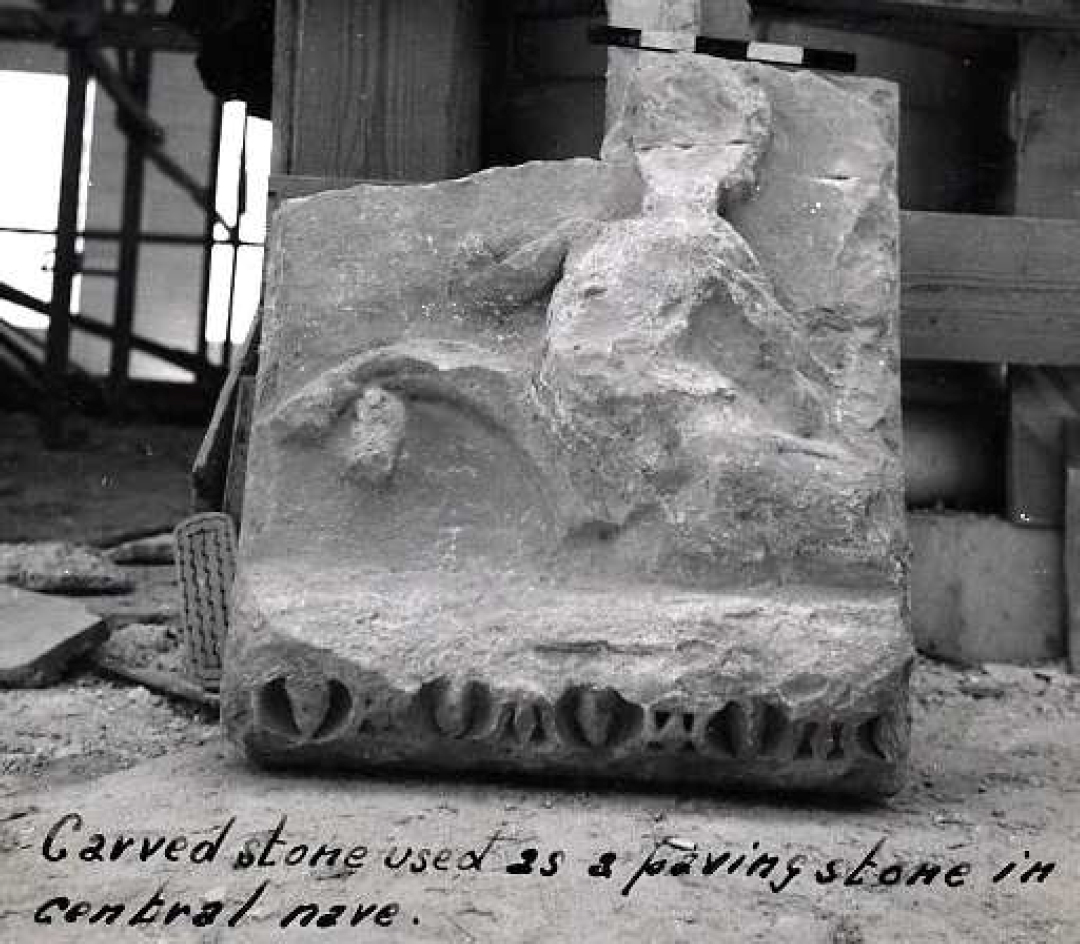
3rd-century Roman relief of a centaur reused as a paving stone inside Al-Aqsa Mosque.

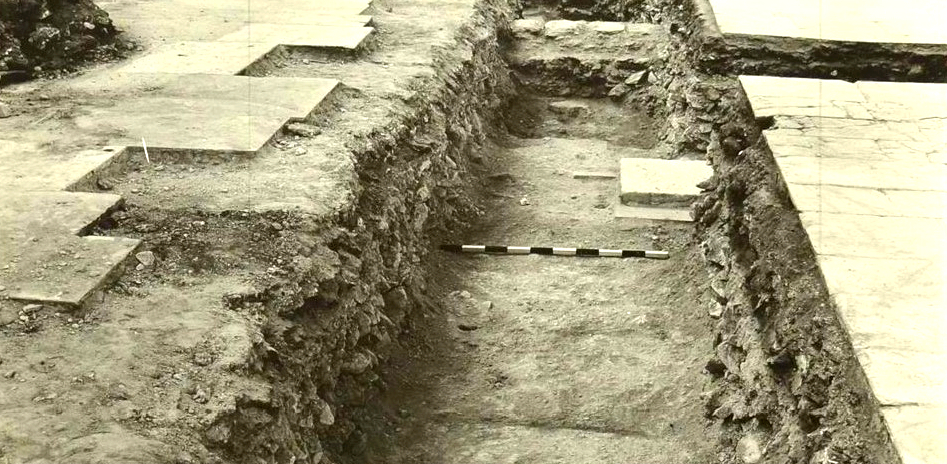
Marble floor revealed during repair work at Al-Aqsa Mosque.

Exploration

=== Sifting project of Solomon's Stables dirt (2005–) ===
The Temple Mount Sifting Project is an archaeological project started in 2005 with the goal of recovering archaeological artifacts from the 300 truckloads of soil removed by the Islamic Religious Trust (Waqf) from the Temple Mount compound's southeast area (sometimes called Solomon's Stables) during the 1996–1999 construction of the underground el-Marwani Mosque. By 2006, the project had recovered numerous artifacts dating from the 8th to 7th centuries BCE from dirt removed in 1999. These include stone weights for weighing silver and a First Temple period bulla, or seal impression, containing ancient Hebrew writing, which may have belonged to a well-known family of priests mentioned in the Book of Jeremiah.

=== Subterranean tunnel system beneath Christ Church ===
A tunnel under Christ Church near the Jaffa Gate was discovered in the 1840s, during construction of Christ Church. In 2001, Rafael Lewis explored this tunnel, and which he conjectured was part of the upper aqueduct system that carried water eastward towards the Temple Mount and that it was probably connected to the cisterns that were under Herod's palace in the Citadel area. After proceeding to a distance of little over 82 metres (269 ft) in an eastward direction, they could not proceed any further, as the passage was blocked by a caved-in roof.

=== First Temple period finds (2007) ===
In 2007, artifacts dating to the eighth to sixth centuries BCE were described as being possibly the first physical evidence of human activity at the Temple Mount during the First Temple period. The findings included animal bones; ceramic bowl rims, bases, and body sherds; the base of a juglet used to pour oil; the handle of a small juglet; and the rim of a storage jar.

== See also ==
- Archaeological excavations into the destruction of the Temple in the Siege of Jerusalem (70 CE) of the First Jewish–Roman War
- Biblical archaeology (excavations and artifacts)
- Levantine archaeology
- Committee for the Prevention of Destruction of Antiquities on the Temple Mount
- Destruction of early Islamic heritage sites in Saudi Arabia
- Islamization of the Temple Mount
- Moroccan Quarter, demolished in 1967
- Temple denial

Associated sites and digs

- Acra (fortress)
- City of David (Silwan)
  - Ancient city walls around the City of David
- Givati Parking Lot dig
- Monumental stepped street (1st century CE)
- Jerusalem Water Channel, running underneath the monumental stepped street
- Ptolemaic Acra or Ptolemaic Baris
- Robinson's Arch
- Wilson's Arch
