= Committee for the Prevention of Destruction of Antiquities on the Temple Mount =

Archeological group in Israel

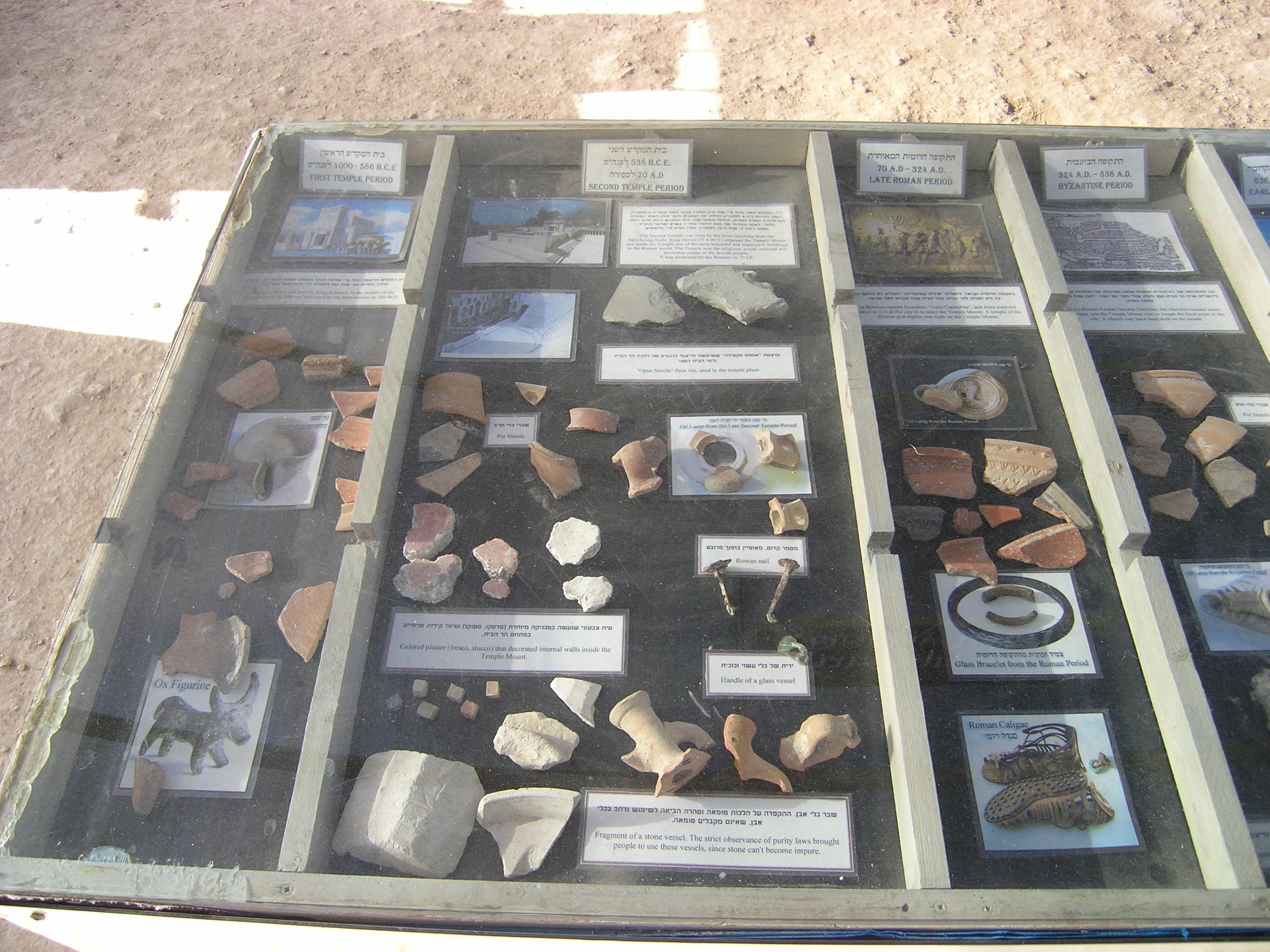
- Sifting project finds
- Formation: January 2000; 26 years ago
- Founded at: Israel
- Purpose: Preserve and protect antiquities on the Temple Mount

The Committee for the Prevention of Destruction of Antiquities on the Temple Mount is a group of archaeologists, intellectuals and other prominent individuals in Israel formed in response to concerns about damage to antiquities from excavations at the Temple Mount and attempts by the Jerusalem Waqf to remove archaeological evidence of a Jewish Temple at the Temple Mount.

== History ==
The committee was founded in January 2000 by archaeologists Eilat Mazar of Hebrew University, Gabriel Barkay, and other prominent individuals in response to a protruding bulge discovered in 2000 in the Temple Mount's southwest corner.

The committee has alleged that the Jerusalem Waqf attempted to remove archaeological evidence that a Jewish temple ever stood at the Temple Mount by opening a mosque at Solomon's Stables in 1999. To monitor the Waqf's construction at the site in the early 2000s, the committee hired aircraft to take aerial photos and monitor for construction progress.

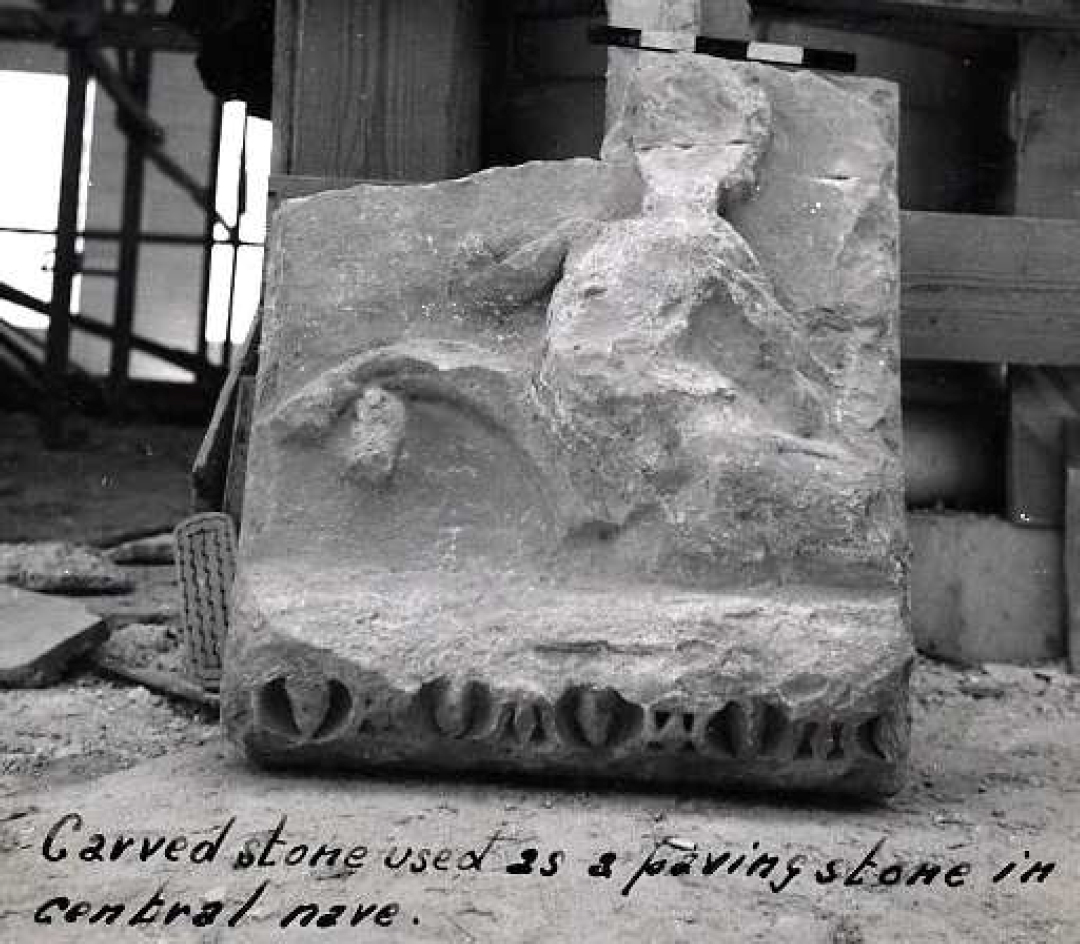
Roman Centaur tile

For decades, the committee pushed for efforts to analyze dirt and rubble dug up during Muslim construction at the Temple Mount site, which Muslim and Jordanian authorities have rejected. Between 2004 and 2017, volunteers associated with the committee went through the dirt removed by the Waqf from the site during construction, discovering half a million pieces of rubble from the First Temple and Second Temple eras. The committee filed a petition to the Israel Supreme Court in 2004 to prevent the Israeli government and Jerusalem Waqf from removing 3,000 tons of dirt from the Temple Mount site. Justice Jacob Turkel granted the group's petition. In 2005, the group publicly criticized the Israeli government for not stopping Waqf construction on the Temple Mount.

In 2018, Zachi Dvira, on behalf of the committee, shared video footage of a multi-date "beautification project" by Muslim volunteers removing earth and stones from atop the Temple Mount, which he claimed were dumped by the Waqf during unauthorized excavations since the early 2000s. Archaeologists had been prevented by Israeli and Muslim authorities from examining the contents.

Members come from a broad swath of Israeli society, from archaeologists to members of the security establishment and politicians. These include former mayor of Jerusalem Teddy Kollek, poet Haim Gouri, and the novelists Amos Oz and A. B. Yehoshua.

== See also ==
- Temple Mount Sifting Project
