= Solomon's Stables =

Islamic prayer hall in the Al-Aqsa Mosque compound

Al-Marwani Mosque
- المصلى المرواني (al-Muṣallā al-Marwāni)
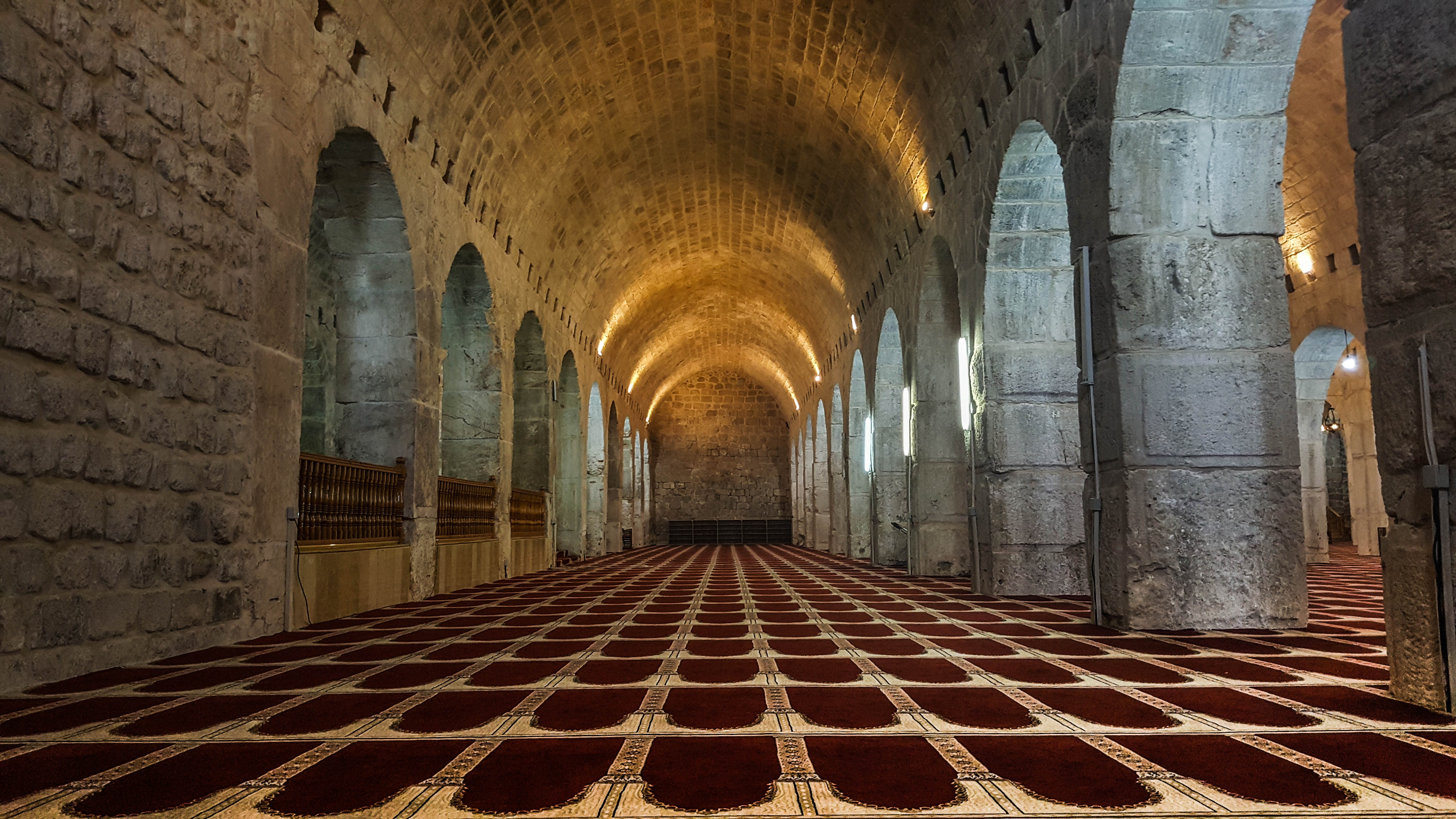

- Location within the Old City of Jerusalem Location within Jerusalem

Religion
- Affiliation: Islam
- Leadership: Muhammad Ahmad Hussein (Grand Mufti of Jerusalem)
- Status: Mosque or unknown usage (7th century–1099); Stable (1099–1187); Closed (1187–1996); Mosque (1996–present)

Location
- Location: Al-Aqsa Mosque Compound (East Jerusalem)
- Administration: Jerusalem Islamic Waqf
- Coordinates: 31°46′35″N 35°14′13″E

Architecture
- Type: Mosque
- Style: Islamic

Specifications
- Capacity: 10,000
- Site area: 3,750 square metres (40,400 sq ft)

Al-Marwani Mosque or Marwani Musalla (Arabic: المصلى المرواني), prior to its renovation it was known as Al-Masjid Al-Qadim (Arabic: المسجد القديم) (“the Old Mosque”) is an underground vaulted mosque in the Al-Aqsa Mosque Compound in Jerusalem. During the Crusader period it was named Solomon's Stables (Latin: Stabula Salomonis, Hebrew: אורוות שלמה) This name, of Crusader origin, was historically the standard Islamic name for the structure as well.

It is 600 square yards (500 square metres) in area, and is located under the southeastern corner of the compound, 12.5 m (41 ft) below the courtyard, and features twelve rows of pillars and arches.

In December 1996 the Jerusalem Waqf renamed and renovated the area, since which the salvaged debris has provided a rare source of information for the Temple Mount's history, where archaeological research is heavily restricted. The current structure is considered to have been erected during the Umayyad period and rebuilt by the Fatimids after the 1033 earthquake.

== History ==
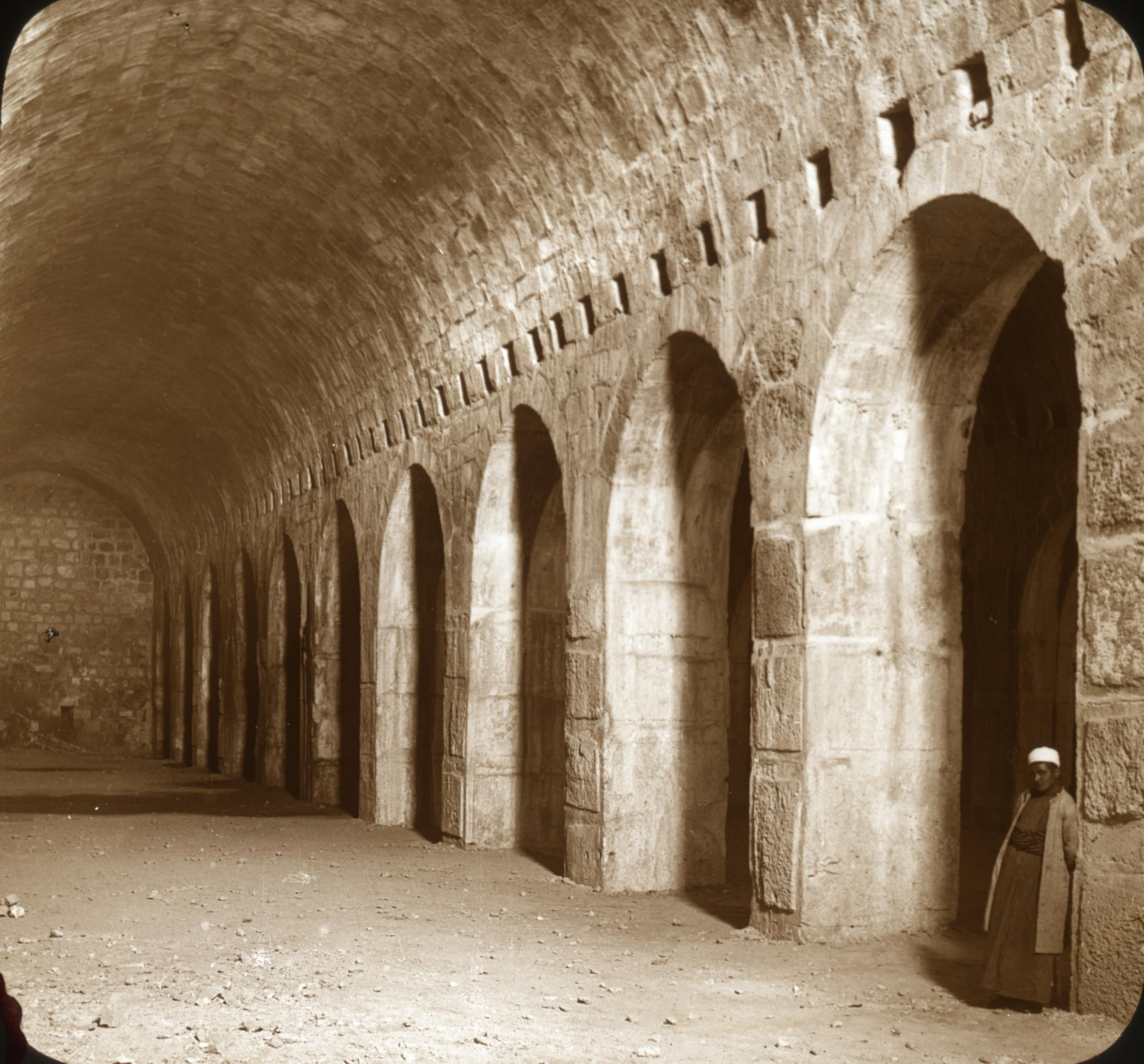
A vaulted hallway of the area prior to the late 20th century work (1915)

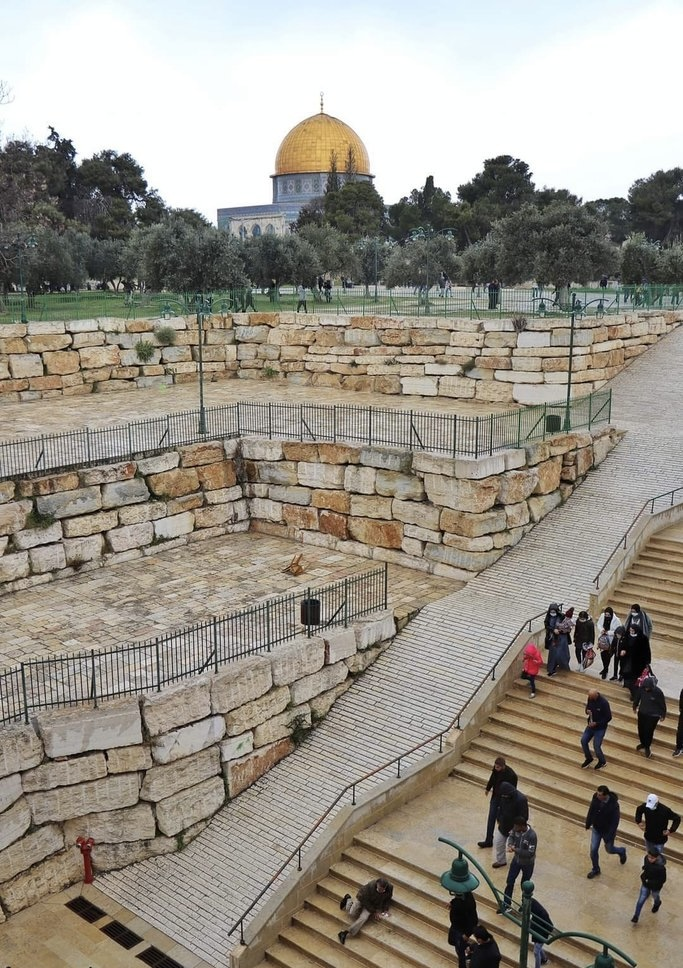
Stairs leading to the mosque, with the Dome of the Rock rising in the background.

The large almost rectangular platform above the slopes of the hill known as the Temple Mount, was constructed by building a substructure consisting of a series of vaulted arches in order to reduce pressure on the retaining walls. These vaults, according to Priscilla Soueck, were "supported by eighty-eight pillars resting on massive Herodian blocks and divided into twelve rows of galleries", and may have originally been storage areas of the Second Temple. According to the PEF Survey of Palestine, the vaulting and piers are of Byzantine origin. Some of the original interior survives in the area of the Herodian staircases, although not in the area now renovated for use as a mosque. Visitors are rarely permitted to enter the areas with Herodian finishes.

The underground space for the most part remained empty except during Crusader rule over Jerusalem. It was probably first restored by the Fatimids, before the Crusaders converted it into a stable for the cavalry. According to John of Würzburg they contained more than 2,000 horses and 1,500 camels, while Theoderich gave the much more impressive number of 10,000 horses together with their grooms.

The rings for tethering horses can still be seen on some of the pillars. The structure has been called Solomon's Stables since the time of the Crusades as a historical composite: 'Solomon's' anachronistically refers to the First Temple built on the site, while the 'stables' refers to the functional usage of the space by the Crusaders in the time of Baldwin II (King of Jerusalem 1118–1131 CE).

=== Cradle of Jesus ===
The structure also contains a small, rectangular chamber known as the "Cradle of Jesus", which serves as a Muslim prayer space. It covers approximately 56 square meters, and is roofed by a north-south barrel vault. The present room was built during the Crusader period, as part of a Christological program that associated sites on the Temple Mount with events from the lives of Jesus and Mary. Its eastern and southern walls incorporate the inner faces of the Herodian enclosure walls. Ancient window openings and a curved stone preserved at the top of the eastern wall may be remnants of the original Herodian vaulting system of the subterranean complex.

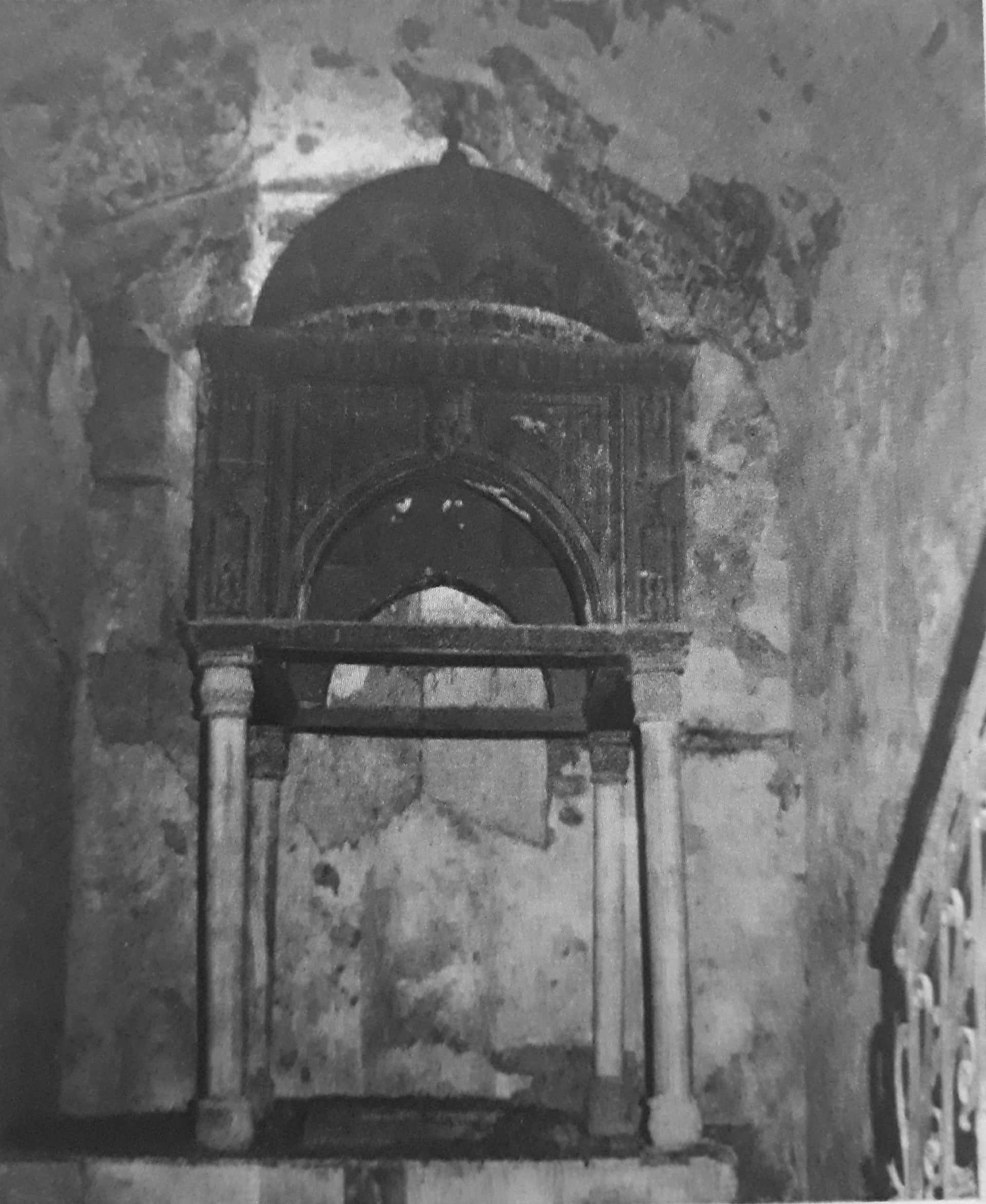
1964 photograph of the Cradle of Jesus

At the chamber's southern end stands a rectangular basin that gave the room its name. Carved from a single block of white limestone, it has one end fashioned into a conch-like form resembling a pillow and is sheltered by a wooden domed canopy supported by four grey-marble columns. The basin may have originated in a Roman architectural setting dating to the 2nd or 3rd century AD.

The room also incorporates Roman and Byzantine architectural elements bearing later Christian features. These may derive from a Byzantine structure at the site and have been deliberately defaced during the early Islamic period, or they may have been reused in the Crusader construction and defaced following the Ayyubid conquest. The western entrance incorporates a Roman architrave reused as a lintel. It is stylistically dated to the late 2nd or early 3rd century AD. Dozens of small crosses were incised on the northern wall, perhaps by Christian pilgrims. Separately, an ashlar in an ancient window frame bears an inscription dating from the late Second Temple period (1st century BC to 70 AD), and tentatively read as mšḥ yhw (משח יהו).

== Modern construction of the Marwani prayer hall ==
Al-Marwani consists of two parts: The first section, corridors of the triple gate, consists of three corridors. The first corridor runs from the main door, the second is a hallway with storage, and the third is now closed with stone, possibly dating to the same period of the Umayyad. The second section, a large settlement area, consists of thirteen terraces of giant pillars. The weight of some of those stones is several tons. There is a high ceiling and a small door connecting the two sections. The area of Marwani is about four dunums, four point five acres, or precisely 3,750 square metres (40,400 sq ft). It can accommodate approximately 10,000 worshipers.

This Musalla is the largest roofed area in Al-Aqsa and has 16 standing stone towers on strong stone pillars. It is entered by going down a flight of stairs near Bi'r al-Waraqah (under al-Qibli musalla) to the northeast of the al-Aqsa Mosque building, or down a newly constructed grand staircase to two northern arches near the east enclosure wall of al-Aqsa.

In the winter of 1996 the Jerusalem Islamic Waqf acquired a permit to use Solomon's Stables as an alternative place of worship for occasional rainy days of the holy month of Ramadan. Later the Waqf declared that it aimed to create a mosque for 10,000 worshippers, making it the largest mosque in the country. This move has been alleged to have been designed to strengthen the Muslim claim over the Temple Mount. The Committee for the Prevention of Destruction of Antiquities on the Temple Mount, a group of Israeli archeologists, alleged that construction of the new prayer hall was an attempt by the Waqf to remove archeological evidence that a Jewish temple ever stood at the Temple Mount.

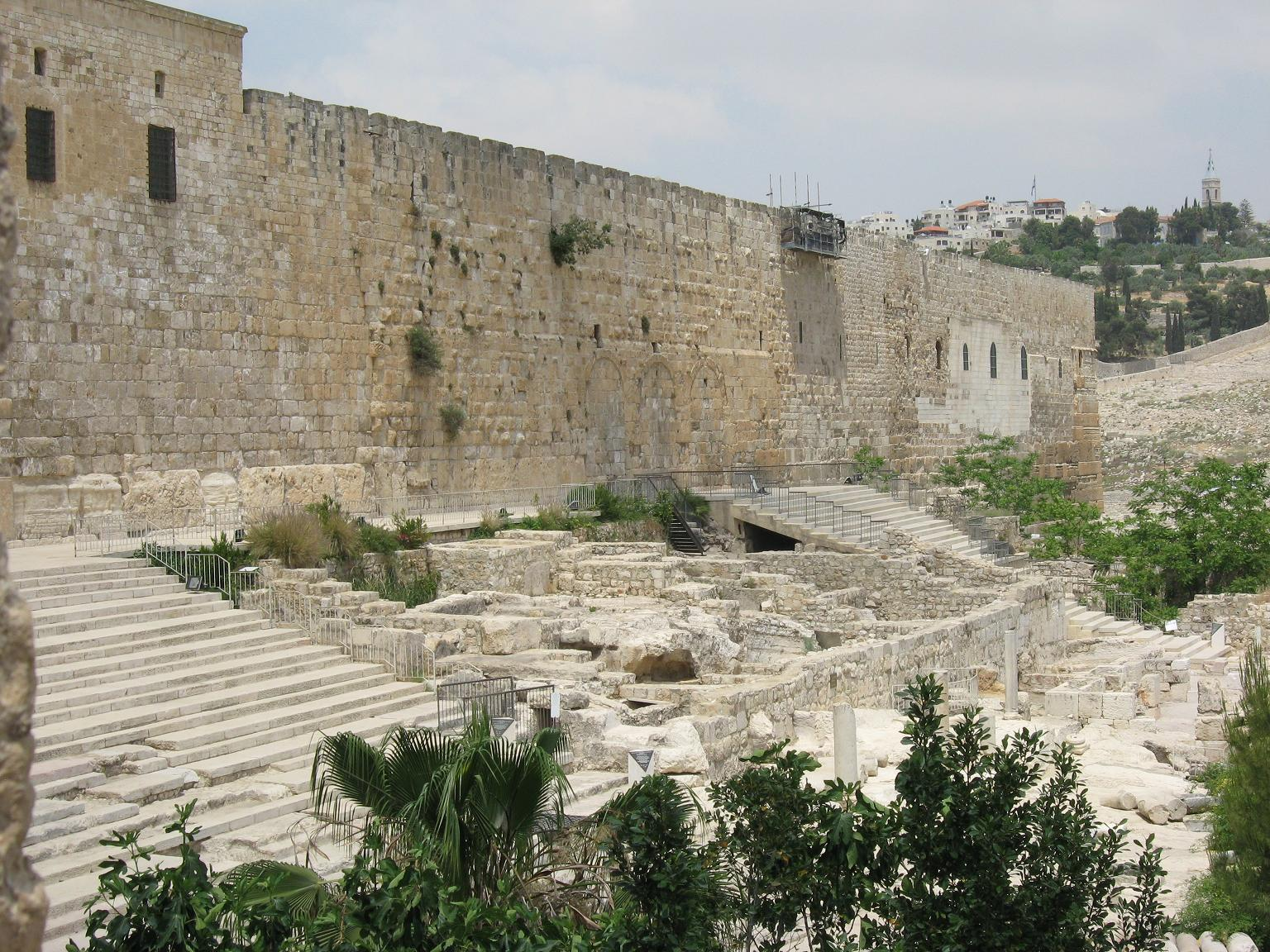
The Southern Wall of the Temple Mount showing damaged area and criticized repair job as a bright white patch to right.

The Waqf began digging a huge hole in the southeastern area of the Temple Mount, without a permit from the Jerusalem municipality or archaeological supervision using tractors and heavy vehicles. This action drew criticism from archaeologists, who said that archaeological strata and artifacts were being damaged in the process and the excavations weakened the stability of the Southern Wall. The excavations are thought to have been responsible for creating a large, visible bulge in the Southern Wall that threatened the structural integrity of the Temple Mount, necessitating major repairs. The repairs were called "unsightly" because they appear as a large, bright, white patch of smooth stones in a golden tan wall of rusticated ashlar.

In December 1996 The newly renovated mosque was officially inaugurated as Al-Marwani Mosque, named after Abd al-Malik ibn Marwan a prominent ruler of the Marwanid branch of the Umayyad dynasty, descended from Marwan I. Abd al-Malik and his son Al-Walid I are also responsible for constructing the early monumental structures of the Dome of the Rock and the Qibli Mosque within the Al-Aqsa Mosque Compound.

In 1999, construction began on an emergency exit for the Al-Marwani Mosque. In doing so, bulldozers dug a pit more than 40 metres (131 ft) long and nearly 12 metres (40 ft) deep, with lorry trucks carting away hundreds of tons of soil and debris from the area. In order to preserve the archaeological integrity of the site, the soil that had been carted away was reclaimed by Israeli archaeologists, who began sifting through the removed earth in search of undisclosed artifacts, a project that became known as the Temple Mount Sifting Project.

=== 2019 fire ===
On April 15, 2019, a minor fire broke out in the guard room in the courtyard of Al-Marwani Mosque. The Waqf fire brigade succeeded in putting out the fire. From some angles it appeared as if smoke was coming out of the underground mosque itself.

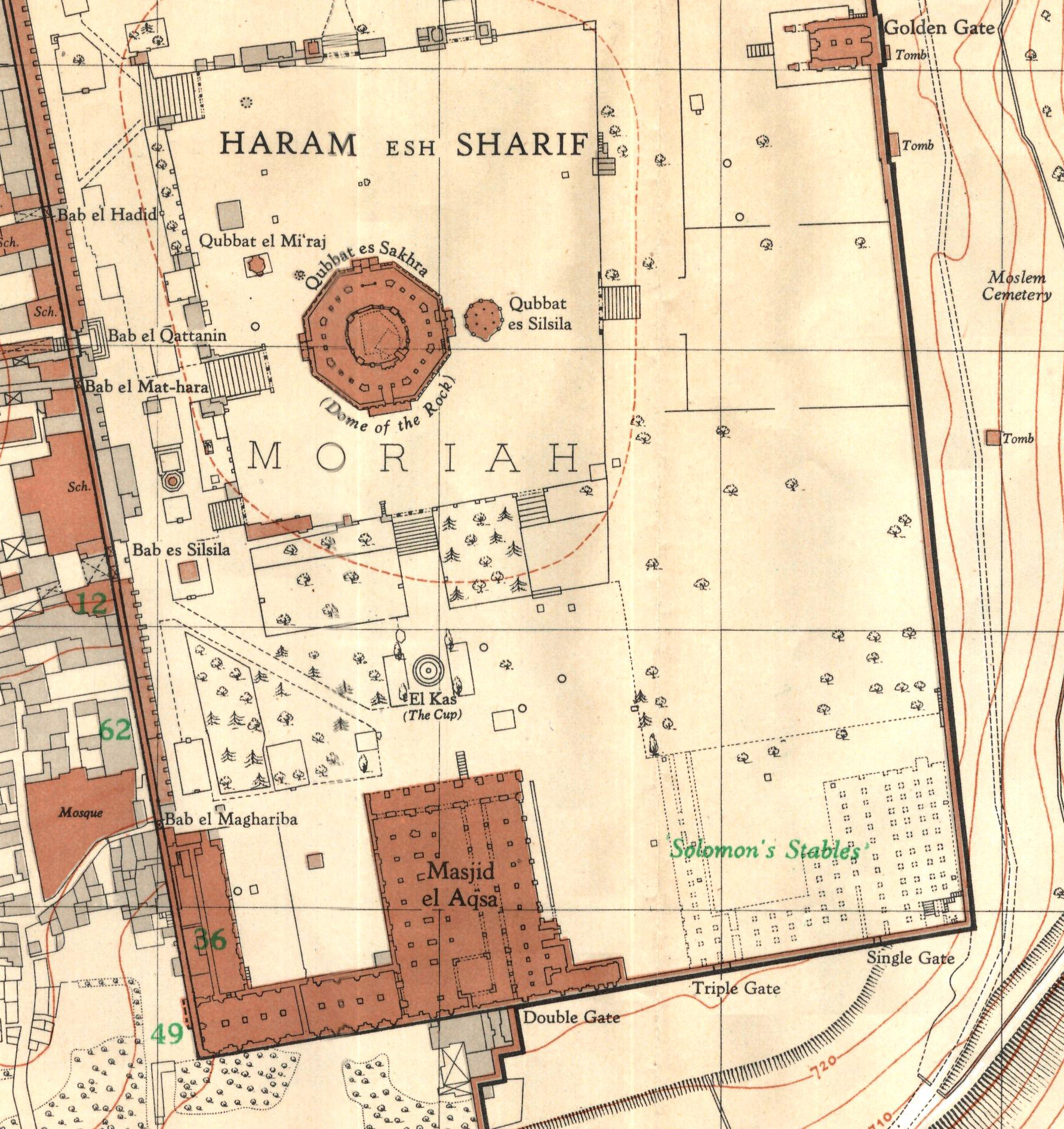
Solomon's Stables in the 1936 Old City of Jerusalem map by Survey of Palestine

== Artifacts ==
The soil removed from the dig was dumped near the Mount of Olives and a salvage operation, the Temple Mount Sifting Project, was undertaken in order to sift through the debris for archaeological remains. Many important finds have turned up. The Israeli Antiquities Authority published a report in 1999. According to this report:

- 14 percent of the shards dated to the First Temple period
- 19 percent to the Second Temple period
- 6 percent to the Roman period
- 14 percent to the Byzantine period
- 15 percent to the early Muslim and medieval periods
- 32 percent could not be identified.

In a June 2000 interview with The Jerusalem Post, the chief Waqf archaeologist said that his colleagues examined the material taken out of the dig "either before or after the excavation" and "found nothing of special interest". In 2016 exquisite floor tiles of the Roman opus sectile type discovered during the sifting process were published and interpreted as likely belonging to the Herodian Temple complex, where they were adorning the floors of the porticos.

== Gallery ==
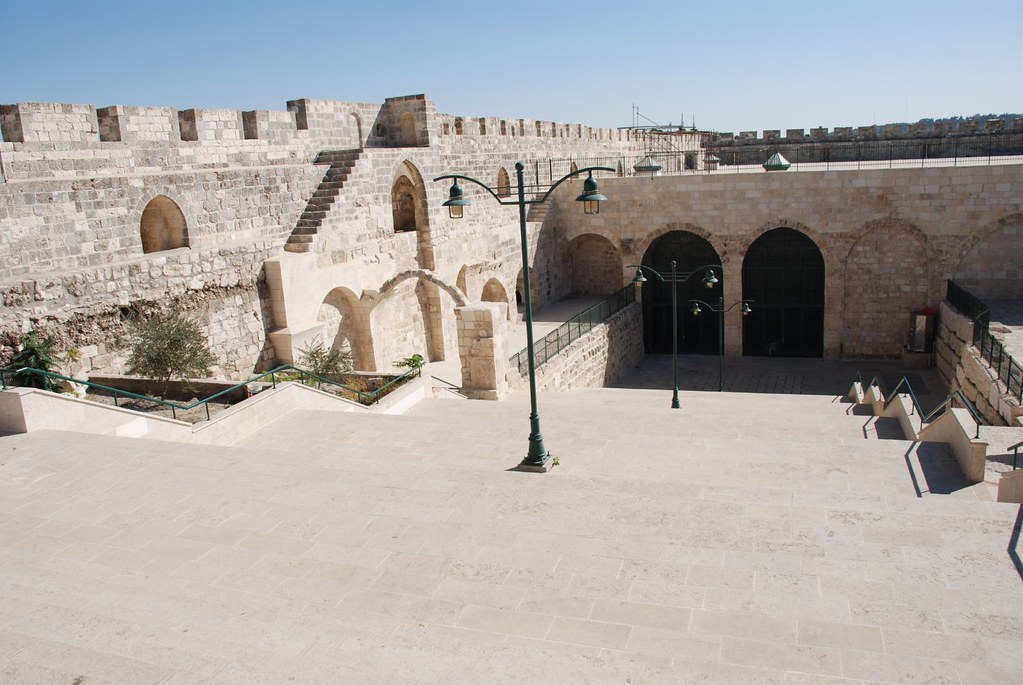
Stairs leading to the entrance (2025)

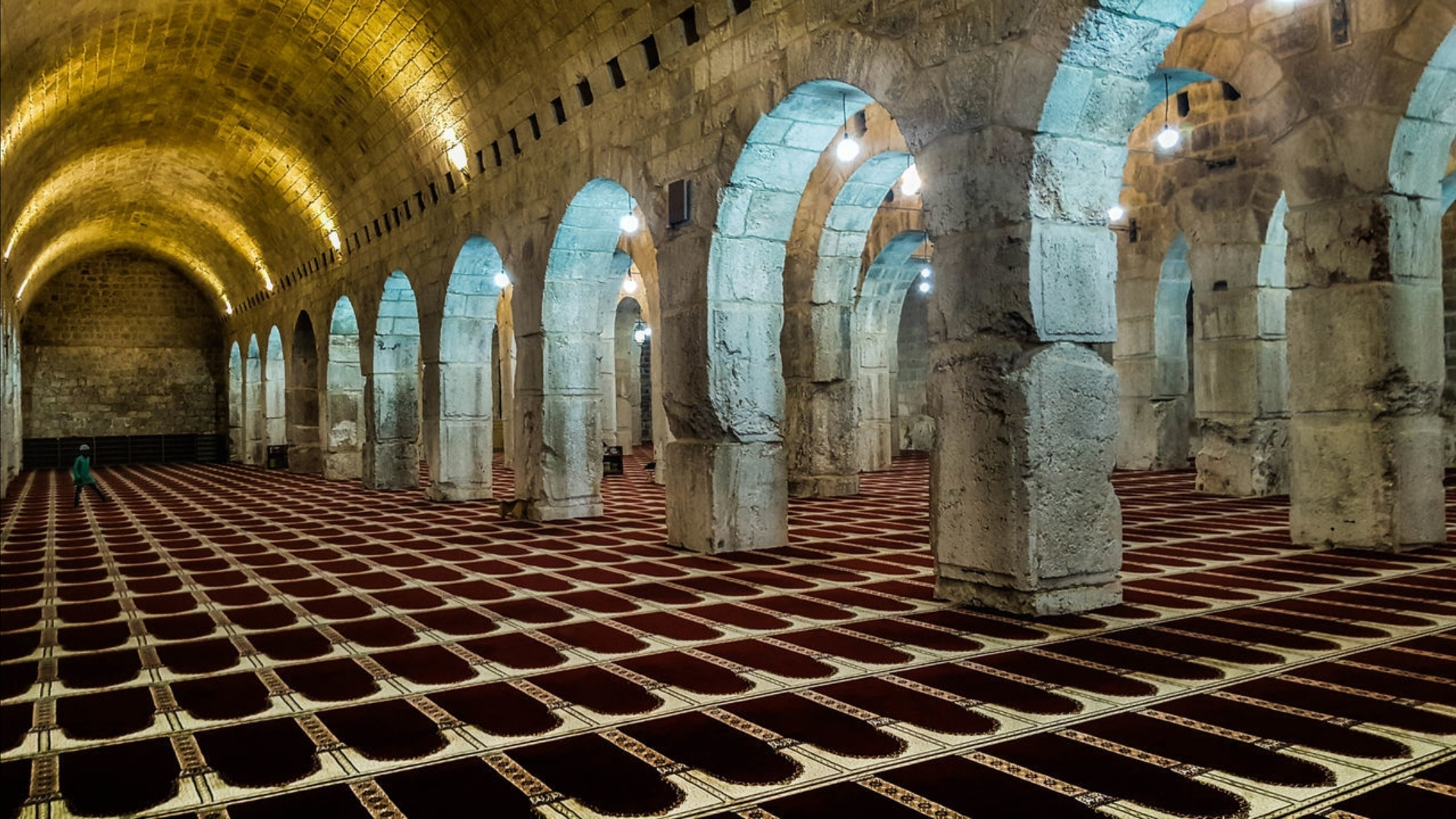
Al-Marawni Mosque (2025)

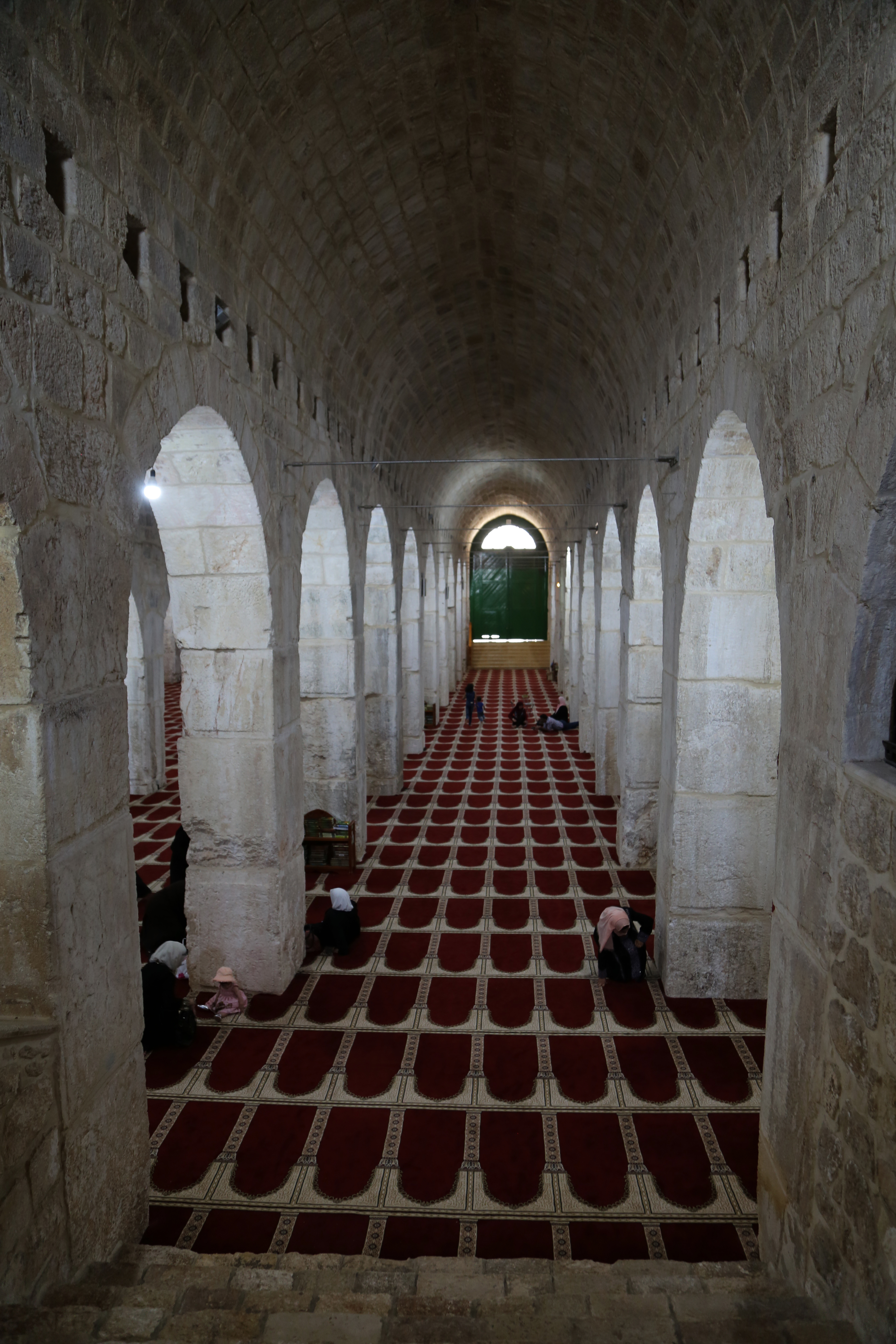
Al-Marawni Mosque (2025)

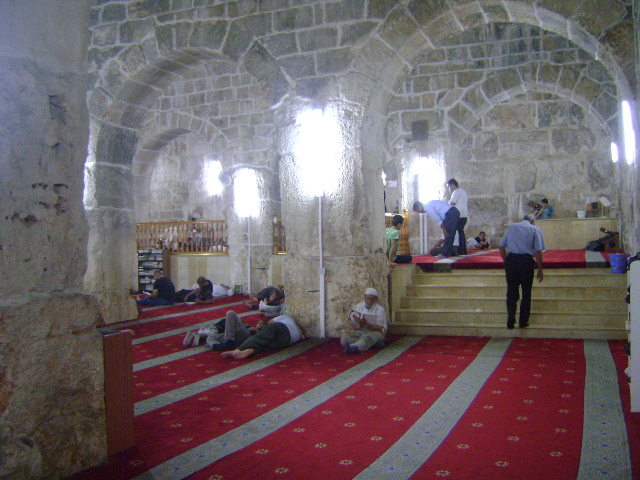
Al-Marawni Mosque (2010)

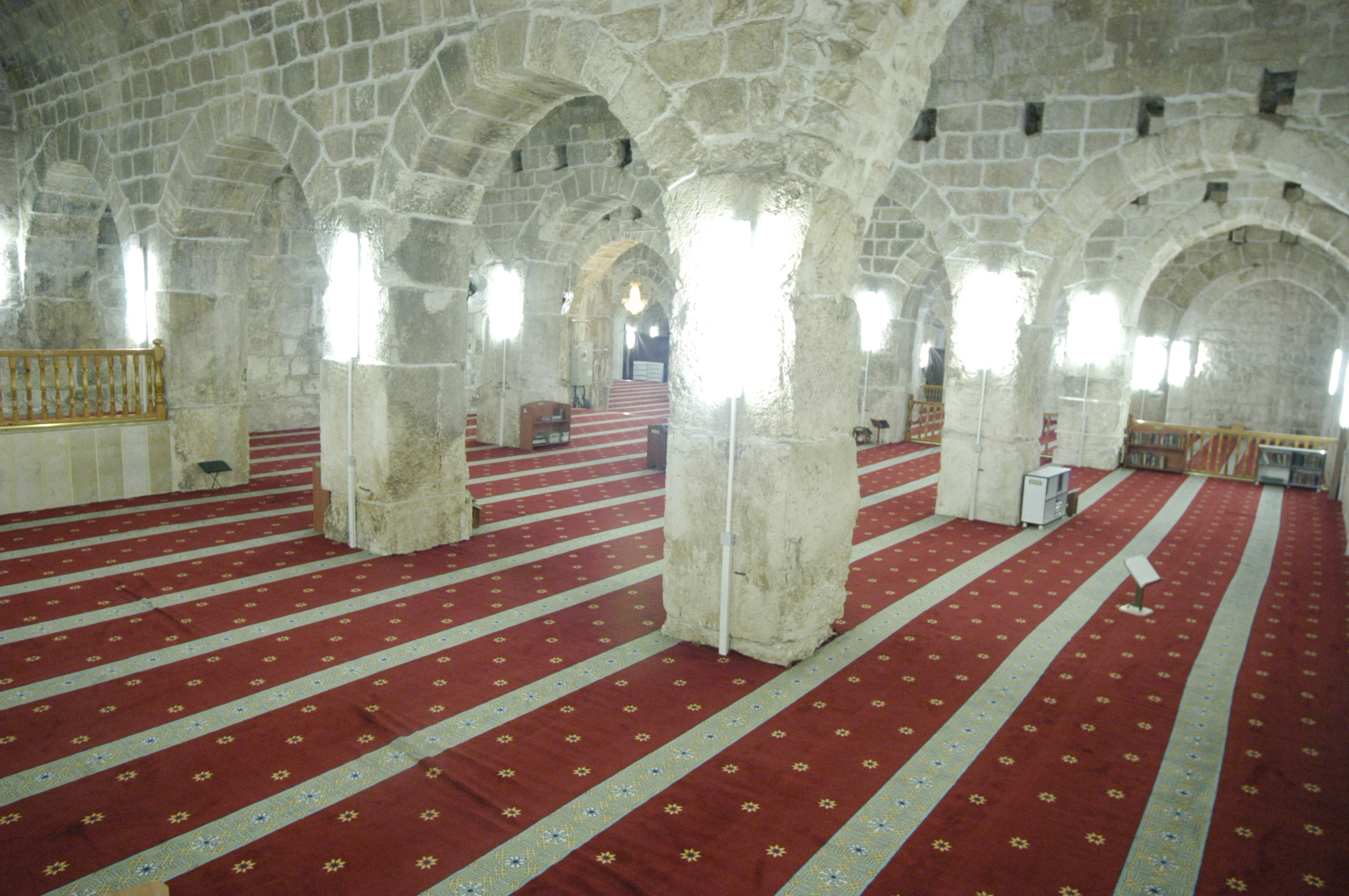
Al-Marawni Mosque (2007)

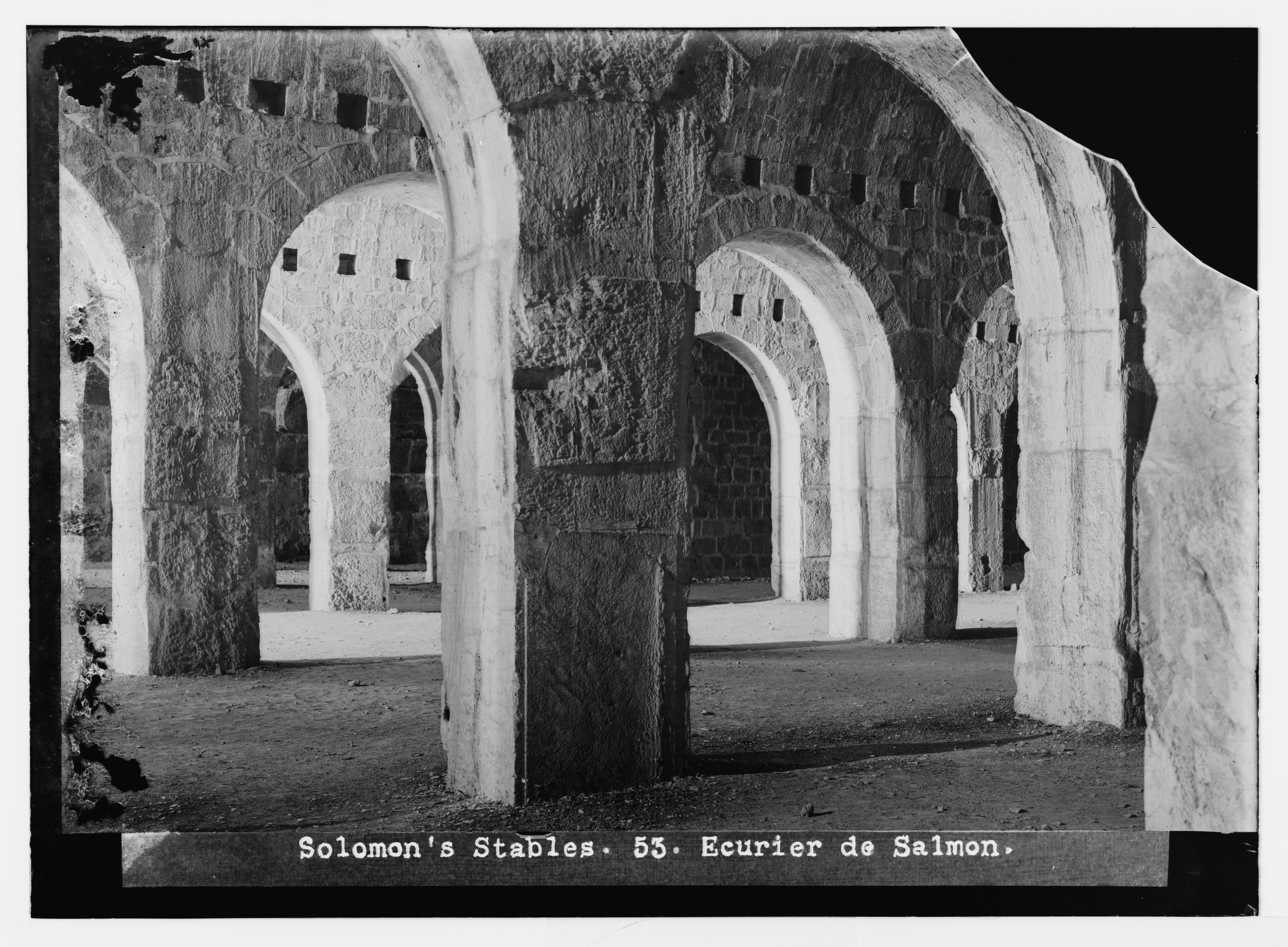
Image dated between 1898 and 1946 of the area

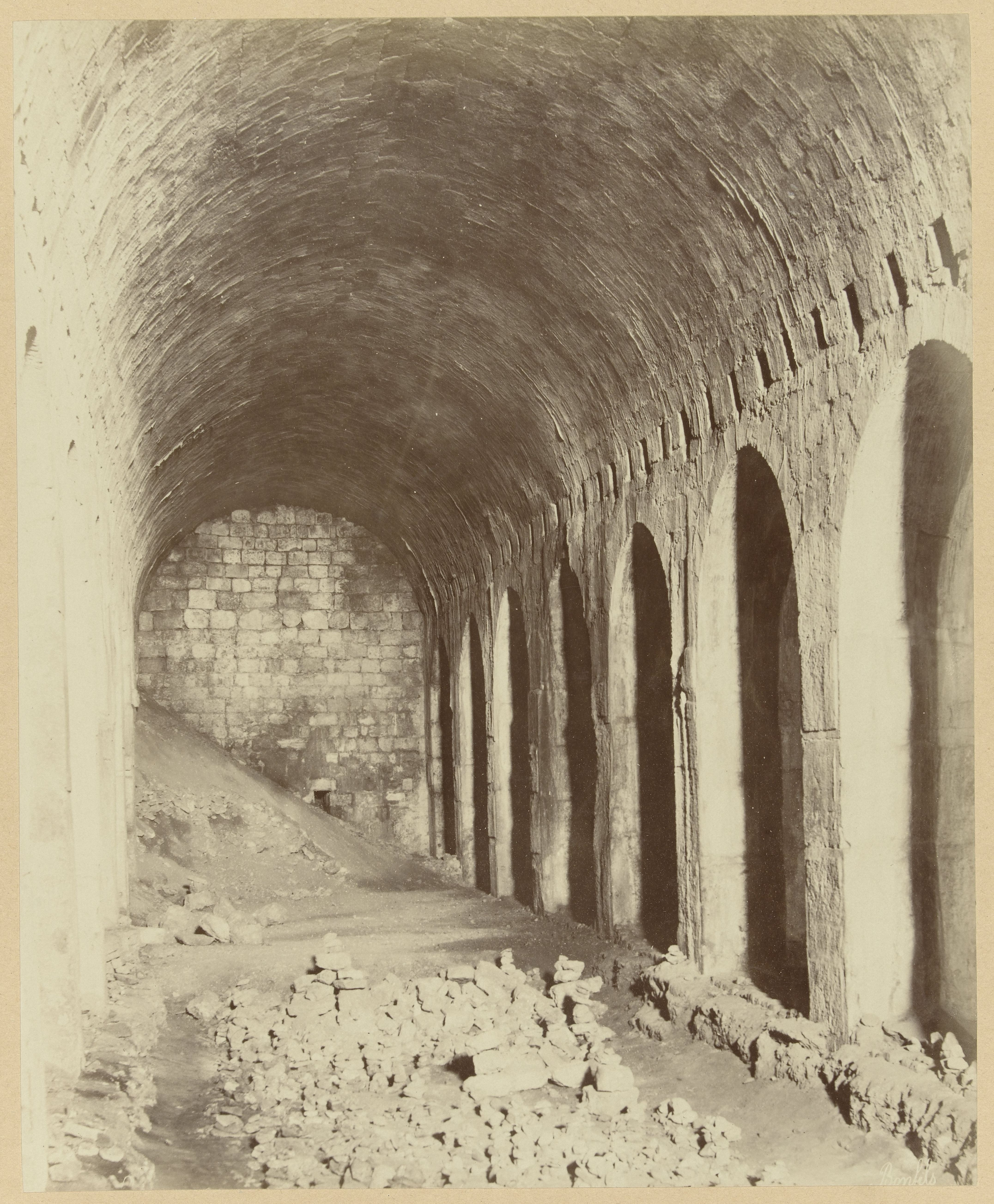
Image dated between 1895 and 1915 of the area
