= Temple Mount Sifting Project =

Archaeological study in Jerusalem

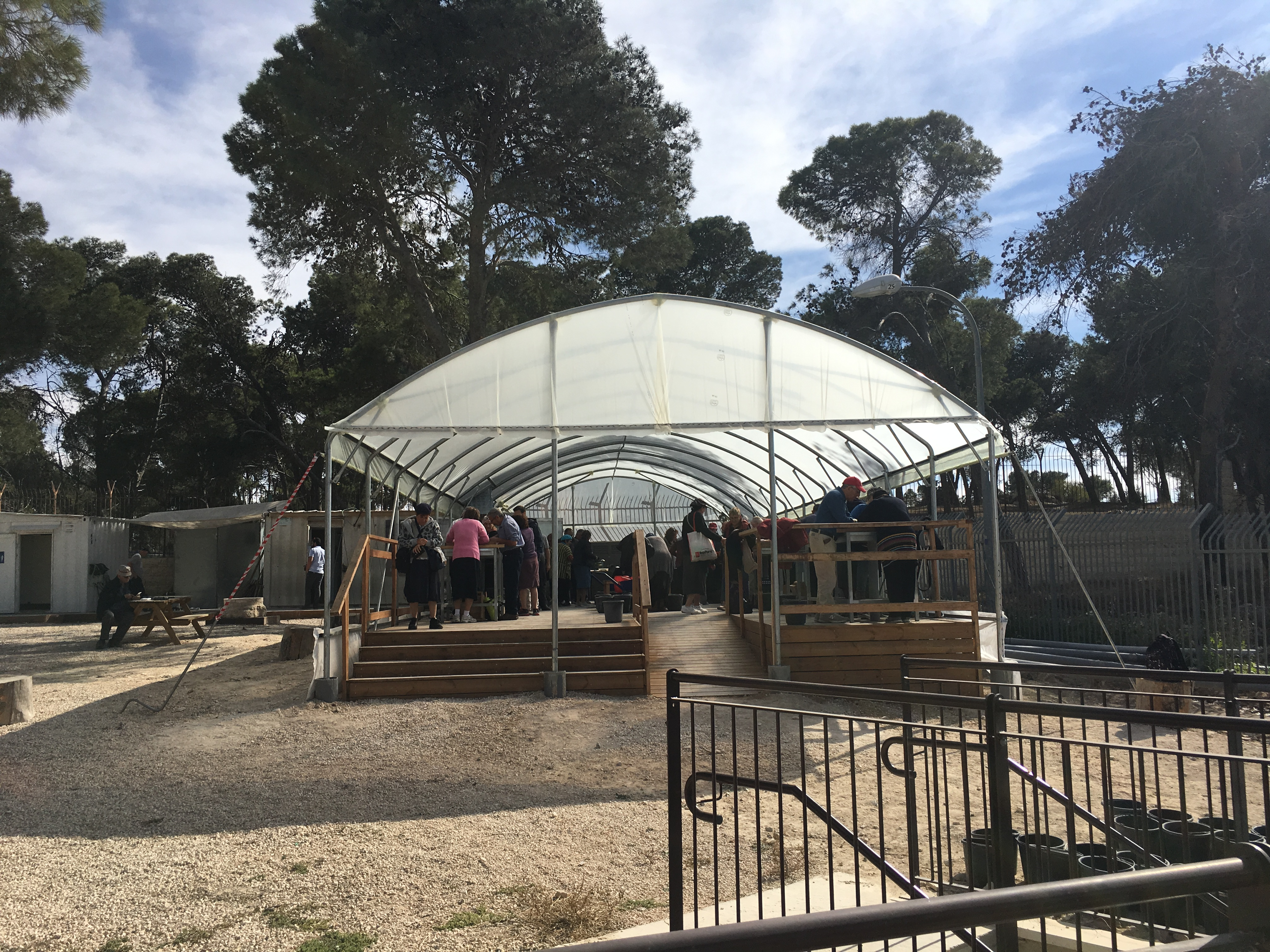
Temple Mount Sifting Project, The Masu'ot Lookout

The Temple Mount Sifting Project (TMSP; formerly known as the Temple Mount Salvage Operation) is an archaeological project begun in 2004 whose aim is the recovery and study of archaeological artifacts contained within debris which were removed from the Temple Mount in Jerusalem without proper archaeological care.

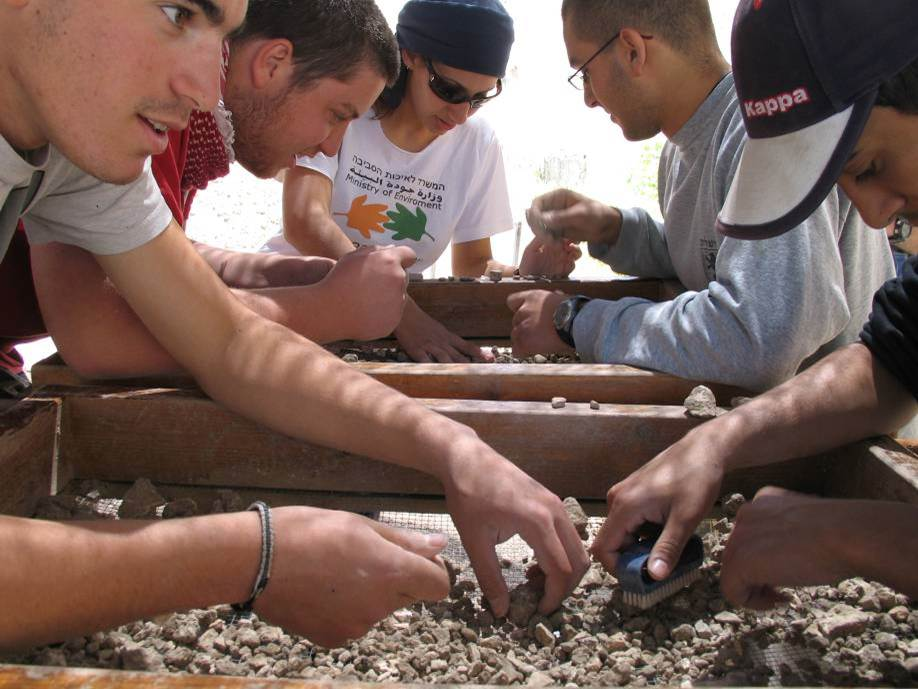
Students participating in the sifting, ca. 2005

The project sifting facility was located until 2017 in Emek Tzurim National Park. In June 2019 it moved to the Masu’ot Lookout at Mount Scopus.

== History ==
Despite its historical importance, no archaeologist has ever been able to carry out a systematic excavation on the Temple Mount. This was the state of affairs, when in November 1999 approximately 9,000 tons of archaeologically rich soil were removed from the Temple Mount by the Waqf, using heavy earth moving equipment and without a preceding salvage excavation or proper archaeological care, following works in and around the newly constructed underground el-Marwani Mosque.

The debris was moved to several locations, with the lion's share (an estimated 350 truckloads) dumped in the Kidron Valley, near the north-eastern corner of the old city. These soil heaps were inspected and sampled by Israel Antiquities Authority officials, but no full-scale excavation ensued.

In 2004, an excavation permit was issued to Israeli archaeologists Gabriel Barkay and Zachi Dvira (Zweig), under the auspices of Bar-Ilan University, who, with funding from private backers through the Israel Exploration Society, proceeded to retrieve most of the heaps of soil and move them to a secure location provided by the Israel Nature and Parks Authority in the Emek Tzurim National Park.

In 2005, after experiencing financial difficulties, the project collaborated with the Ir-David foundation, who took responsibility on the administration of the sifting site, while the scientific oversight retained by Barkay and Dvira. Over the years, in addition to its scientific mission, the project took on an educational and touristic character as well, drawing hundreds of thousands of volunteers and tourists who briefly joined the sifting activity, supervised by staff members.

In April 2017, the Sifting Project withdrew its partnership with the Ir David Foundation and discontinued active sifting, focusing instead on laboratory research of artifacts already recovered. The Sifting Project has held several Crowdfunding campaigns, and as of December 2018, has enough funds to keep afloat, but not enough to complete all research nor to resume the sifting, which has continued sporadically, and a public commitment by the Israeli Prime Minister Benjamin Netanyahu to provide government backing for the Project, has yet to bear fruit. The Ir David Foundation retains the former sifting site of the project in Emek Tzurim and runs an "Archaeological Experience", where visitors sift soil from various excavations in Jerusalem. Active sifting of Temple Mount soil resumed in June 2019, in a new site atop Mount Scopus.

== Methodology ==
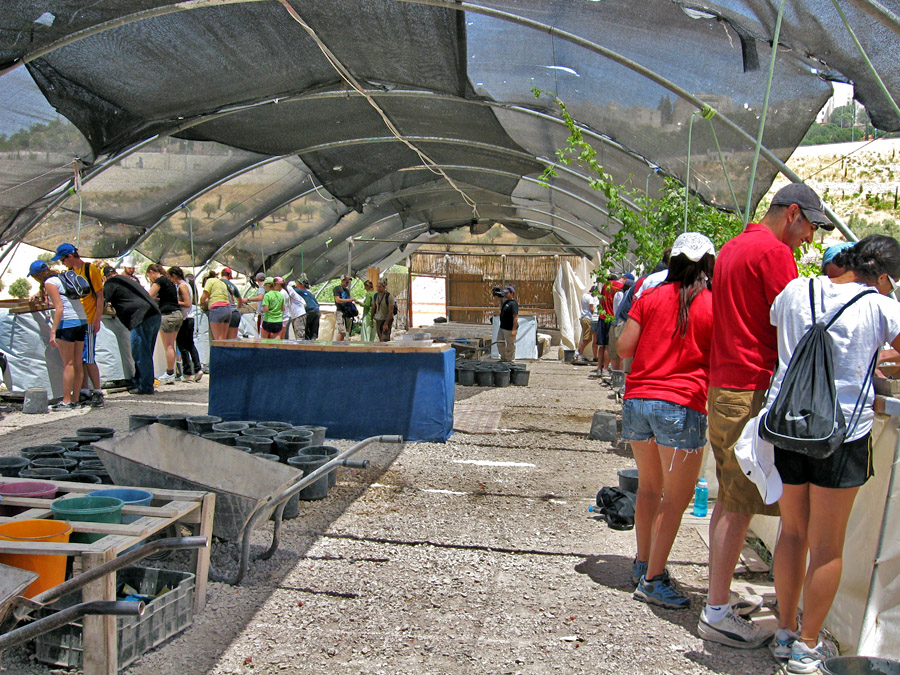
Students at the Emek Tzurim National Park sifting site in 2008

Unable to apply traditional excavation techniques to the disturbed soil, the project founders opted to sift the entirety of the soil retrieved from the dumping grounds. At the sifting site, the soil was dry-sifted and transferred into buckets, where it was left to soak. The remaining soil was then washed off over a wire mesh, and archaeological artifacts hand-picked from among remaining stones and modern refuse. This process was mostly undertaken by volunteers and tourists, under supervision of experienced staff. Objects retrieved from the wet-sifting process are then sorted and cataloged by on-site archaeologists, and transferred to an archaeological laboratory, to be further studied by specialists who prepare the finds for publication. Much like an archaeological survey, the types of finds are categorized, counted and compared to different types both within the site and in nearby sites.

Prior to the onset of the TMSP, the wet-sifting technique, in which significant portions of the site's soil (as opposed to selected loci) are water-screened, was used by local archaeologists only in some prehistoric sites. This led to a problem in comparing finds from the Temple Mount to other sites. For example, while comparison to other Iron Age Judahite sites showed a similar distribution of different types of figurines (human, animal, etc.), the percentage of fragments was incomparable – more leg fragments were recovered by the TMSP than all other sites combined, and horn\ear fragments were reported solely by the TMSP. This is not to say that such fragments did not exist at other sites, but rather, that their small size caused them to remain unnoticed by archaeologists excavating via traditional methods.

To overcome this sampling bias, samples were taken from various excavation sites in Jerusalem and subjected to wet-sifting to act as a control group. In the ensuing years, multiple excavation projects in Jerusalem and its environs have adopted the wet-sifting technique, some of them outsourcing the sifting work to the TMSP. The rising popularity of the wet-sifting technique has correlated to a notable rise in the number of seals and seal impressions discovered in excavations carried out in Jerusalem.

In January 2013, the project announced the development of a statistical method using cluster analysis to partially reconstruct the original context of some of the finds. Later that year, it was announced that enough artifacts had been collected to serve as a representative sample, and common finds collected from that point forward will not be included in the final publication.

== Finds ==
Most of the artifacts discovered are quite small, no larger than a few centimeters. Their origins span several millennia – from the Stone Age up to the 20th century.

=== Stone and Bronze Ages ===
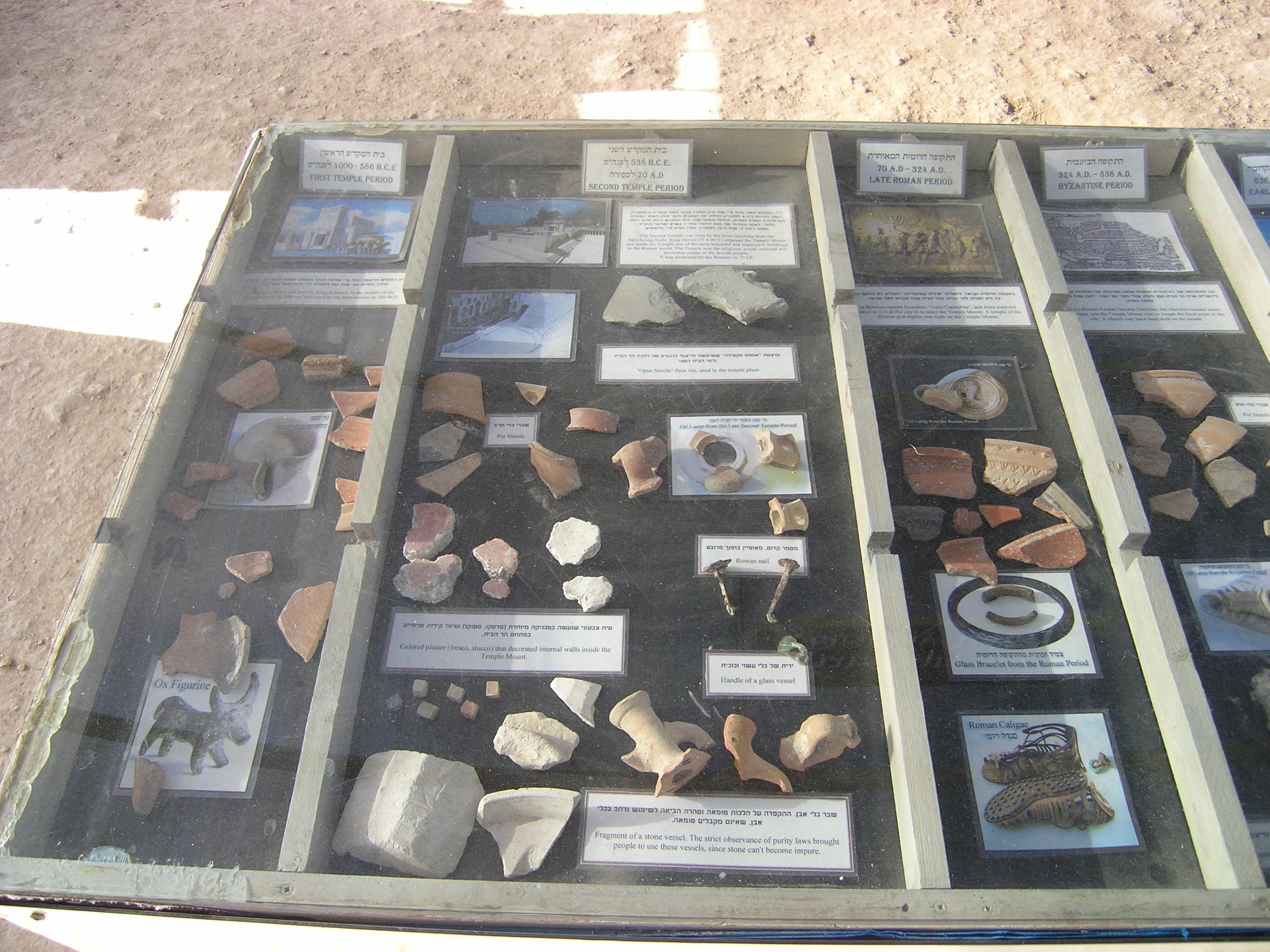
Examples of common finds, early periods.

Only a tiny fraction of the finds date to these periods, the earliest among them dated to the Epipalaeolithic or the Neolithic Period. The Chalcolithic and Bronze Ages are mostly represented by sherds of local pottery, but some examples of Mycenaean pottery have been found as well. Other finds from these periods include 3 Bronze Age scarabs and an amulet bearing the name of Thutmose III. A broken finger of a statue probably dates to the Late Bronze Age.

=== Iron Age (First Temple Period, 1000–586 BCE) ===
Approximately 15% of the pottery finds in the TMSP date to the Iron Age, mostly to the Iron Age IIb-III (800–586 BCE).

Among the finds from the Iron Age IIa (10th–9th century BCE) are a rare impression seal and an arrowhead.

The later Iron Age is well represented in the finds: About 130 typical Judahite figurine fragments have been recovered from the Temple Mount soil, and another 30 from an ancient garbage dump on the eastern slopes of the Temple Mount. Other finds include Judean stone weights, weaponry – including a rare arrowhead of the Scytho-Iranian type – introduced to Jerusalem by the forces of Nebuchadnezzar II, and inscription bearing artifacts. These include a LMLK seal, dozens of ostraca and several seals and sealing (bullae), the most prominent among them being the Immer Bulla, a broken sealing, paleographically dated to the 7th–6th century BCE and bearing the incomplete given name ...lyahu and the patronym Immer, the name of a well known Biblical priestly family, of which one member is recorded as a major office holder in the Temple. The sealing, which bears on its back fiber impressions, was affixed to a cloth sack, pouch, or lid, possibly relating to the Temple treasury.

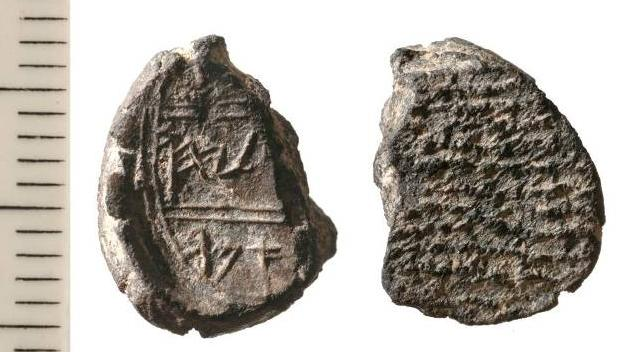
The Immer bulla, a Paleo-Hebrew seal found during the project, part of a larger group of Canaanite and Aramaic seal inscriptions.

=== Second Temple Period (516 BCE – 70 CE) ===
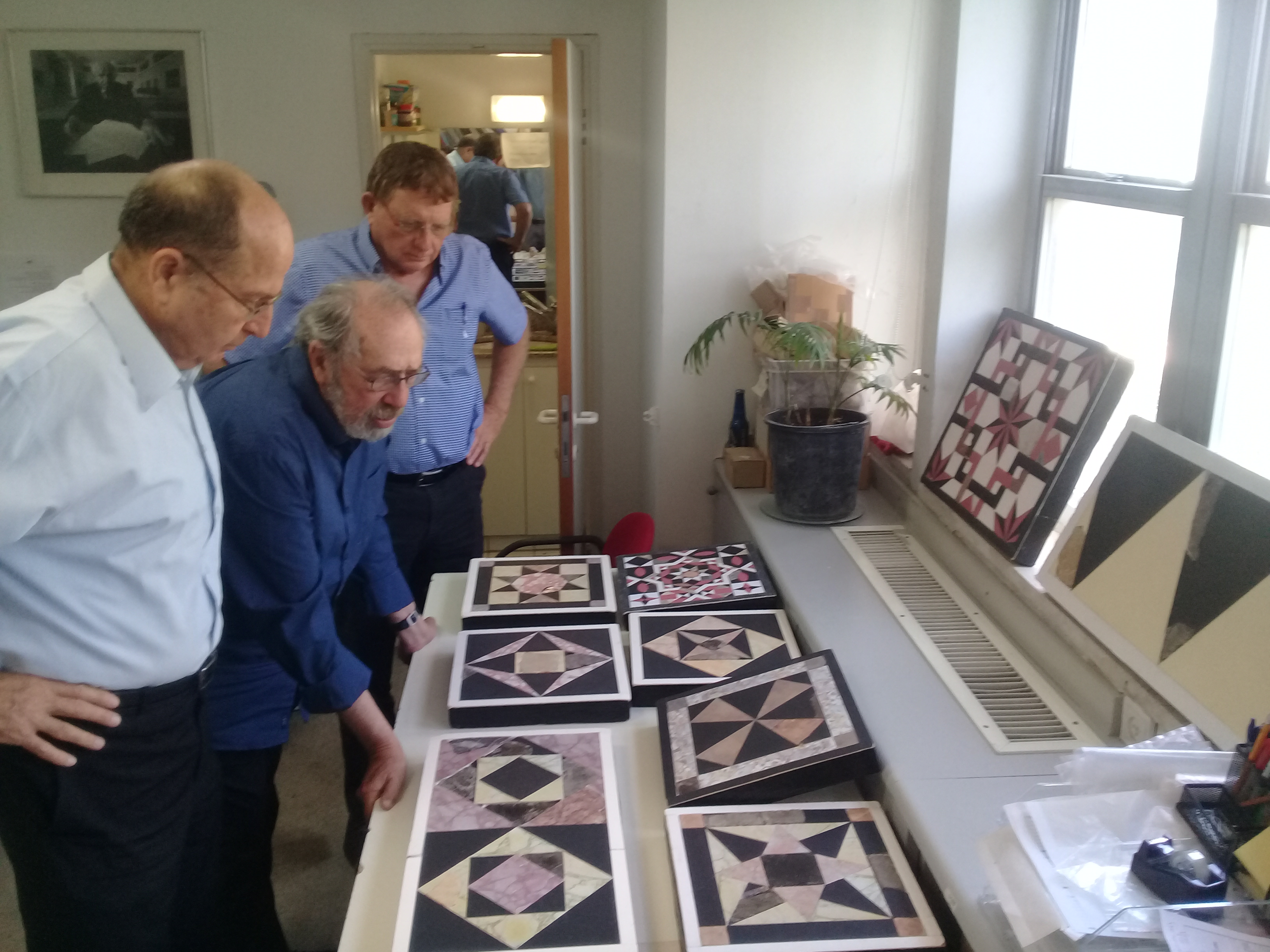
Herodian and other Opus Sectile tile patterns presented by Gabriel Barkay (leaning) to Moshe Ya'alon (left)

Within the Temple Mount's history, no other period saw as much activity as the Second Temple period – both in terms of construction projects carried out, chiefly that of Herod's temple, and in volume of people going about their day-to-day activity. This is well attested in the pottery finds of the TMSP, over 40% of which date to this period (two-thirds of that dating between Herod's reign (37 BCE) and the Destruction of the temple (70 CE)).

A number of architectural remains are ascribed to this period, the largest among them being a 75 cm wide Doric capital, which may have topped an 18-foot tall column within Solomon's Porch. Another noted architectural discovery consisted of dozens of multi-colored Opus sectile tiles of various shapes, which enabled a reconstruction of the tiling patterns employed in the courtyards of Herod's Temple.

More than 500 of the coins discovered in the sifting date to this period, spanning from the 6th century BCE Yehud coinage till the First Jewish Revolt coinage of the year 70 CE.

Other finds of the period include hundreds of fragments of stone vessels typical of the late Second Temple Period, over a thousand fresco fragments, weaponry and epigraphic finds.

=== Byzantine Period (324–638) ===
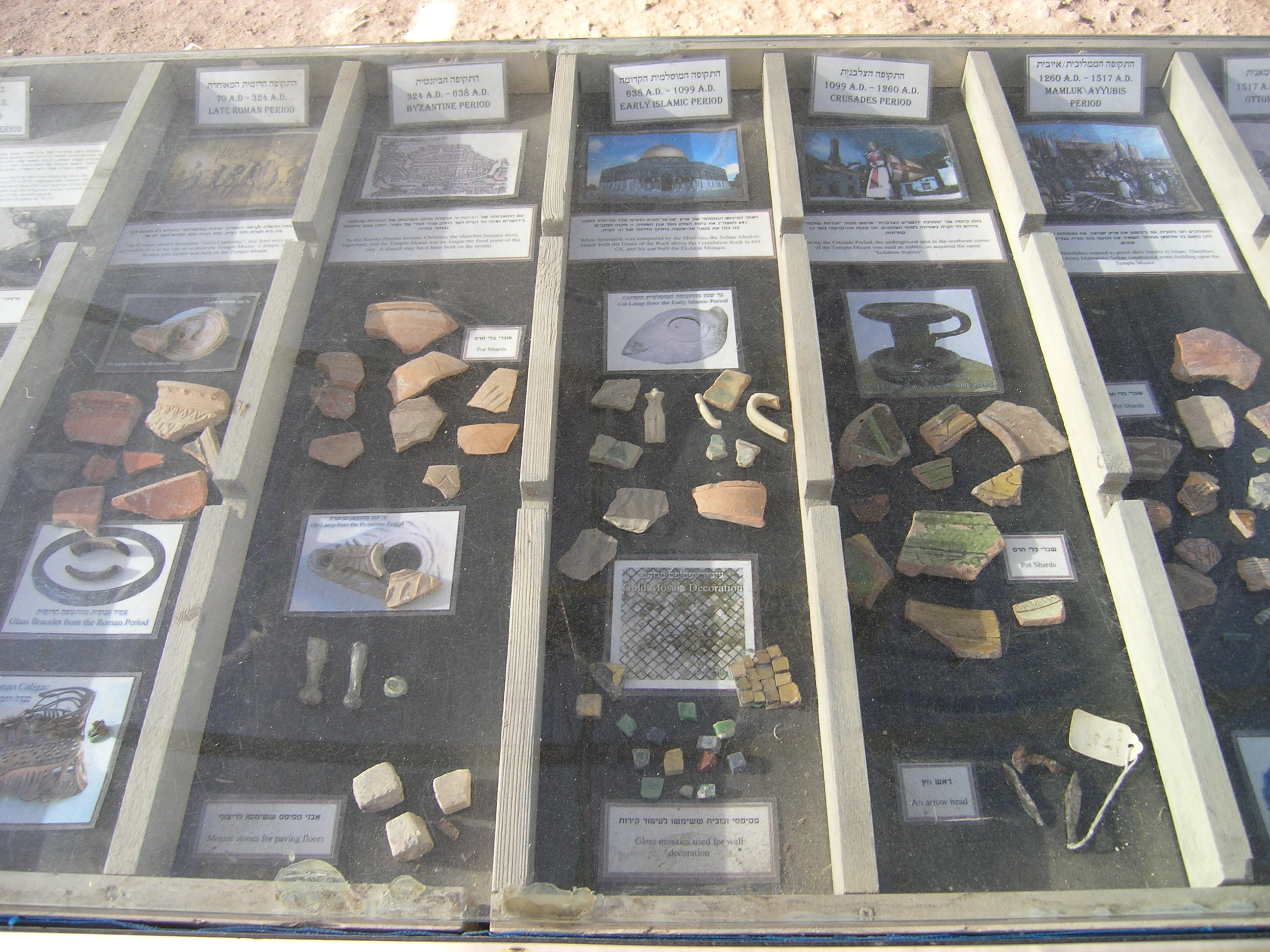
Examples of common finds, Classical-Medieval Periods.

A full third of all the coins found date to this period, along with large amounts of pottery. A relatively surprising phenomena was the discovery of a large number of luxurious architectural artifacts from the period – including Opus sectile tiles, roof tiles, Corinthian capitals, chancel screens and a multitude of mosaic tesserae – which led researchers to question the historical sources that depict the Temple Mount as abandoned at the time. Additional finds include cruciform pendants, clay oil lamps emblazoned with crosses and bronze weights.

=== Early Islamic Period (638–1099) ===
Approximately one in four pottery fragments recovered by the TMSP date to this period, mostly consisting of Umayyad tableware and storage vessels, and Abbasid tableware, storage and cooking vessels.

Other finds include many architectural elements connected to the construction of the Dome of the Rock and the Al-Aqsa Mosque, the most prominent being thousands of colored and gilded mosaic tesserae belonging to wall mosaics, most likely the mosaics akin to those adorning the inner walls of the dome of the rock, which adorned the outer walls till their replacement by glazed tiles in the 16th century.

=== Crusader Period (1099–1187) ===
During this period, the use of the sub-floor structure of the Temple Mount as a stable by the Knights Templar gave Solomon's Stables its current name. This is reflected in finds such as hundreds of armor scales, horseshoe nails, and arrowheads. Over a hundred silver Crusader coins make up the biggest and most varied collection of such coins from Jerusalem. Opus Sectile tiles from this era match up exactly to patterns seen under the Dome of the Rock's carpeting, as well as the church of the Holy Sepulchre.

=== Mamluk and Ottoman periods (1260–1917) ===
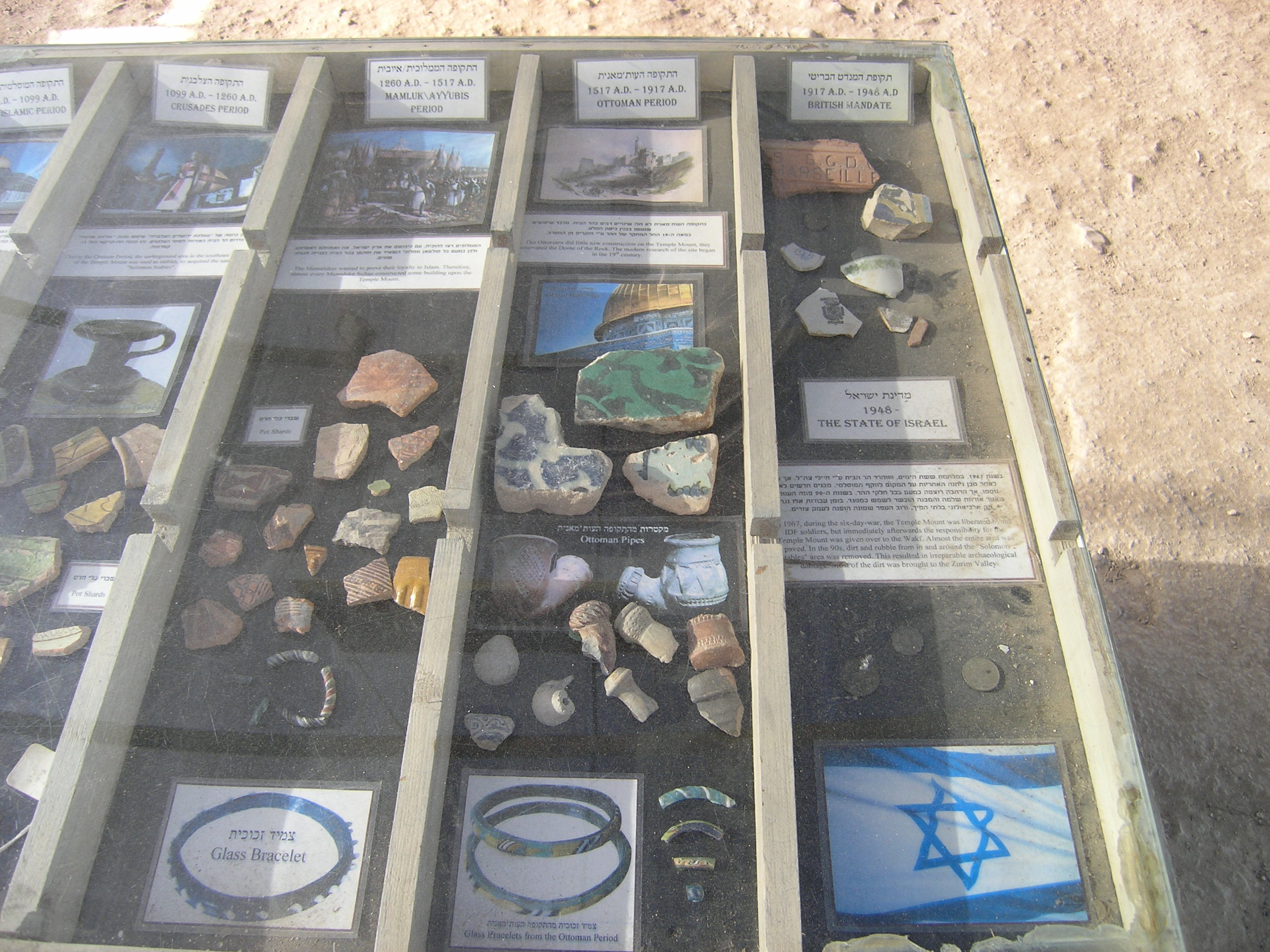
Examples of common finds, later periods.

The Mamluk period is represented mainly by pottery, coins, gaming pieces, jewelry and some architectural elements.

A large variety of finds date to the Ottoman Period, including finds related to renovation projects undergone during this era, such as glazed tiles which have coated the outer walls of the Dome of the Rock since the 16th century, and fragments of colorful Stained Glass Windows.

Over a dozen personal seals dating to this period were found, including one bearing the name of Sheikh Abd al-Fattah al-Tamimi, who would go on to serve as deputy to the Grand Mufti of Jerusalem, and Qadi in Ramla, Gaza and Nablus in the early 18th century.

Hundreds of clay pipes, and various types of weaponry, including gunflints, and lead and iron bullets and shells.

A large amount of glass bracelet and anklets span both the Mamluk and Ottoman Periods.

=== World War I and onward (1917–1999) ===
Many modern artifacts were found, including mainly pottery such as porcelain and Marseilles tiles, modern coinage, prayer rugs and clothing accessories including military insignia and weaponry of various military forces.

== See also ==
- Archaeology in Israel
- Tourism in Israel
- National Parks of Israel
- Committee for the Prevention of Destruction of Antiquities on the Temple Mount
