= List of archaeological excavations in Jerusalem =

List of archaeological excavations in Jerusalem is an incomplete list of archaeological excavations in Jerusalem.

In 1952 Father Jan Jozef Simons published Jerusalem in the Old Testament: Researches and Theories, which was a complete list of all archaeological excavations in Jerusalem up until the Second World War; the book become the "Jerusalem Bible" for archaeologists.

Small scale excavations continued between 1948 and 1967, but the modern excavation of the city accelerated only after Israel's capture of East Jerusalem in 1967.

== 19th century ==
The nineteenth century saw much interest in Jerusalem develop. British Protestants, eager to find hard evidence for their Christian convictions, set out to dig the Holy City. Among them were Flinders Petrie, Charles Warren, Charles William Wilson and Montague Parker.

== British Mandate ==
During the Mandate, efforts to excavate Jerusalem continued with digs by R. A. Stewart Macalister in the City of David.

== Jordanian rule ==
Under Jordanian rule, Kathleen Kenyon excavated in the City of David, discovering numerous important finds including the proto-Ionic capital.

== Summary table ==
Years	Primary excavators	Backing organization	Findings
1867	Charles Warren	PEF	Warren's Shaft
1923, 1925	R. A. Stewart Macalister and J. G. Duncan		Ophel Hill, top of Stepped Stone Structure which they called the "Jebusite Wall"
1938–1942	Robert Hamilton, W.B. Kennedy Shaw, Salem Effendi Husseini, C.N. Johns and Jack Dikijian		During repairs to al-Aqsa mosque partially destroyed in 1927 earthquake, uncovered a Marble pavement beneath the floor of the al-Aqsa mosque from earlier structure, Mosaic (Byzantine), Ceiling rafters (late 6th-century CE) with Greek graffiti, etc.
1961–1967	Kathleen Kenyon		Proto-Ionic capital from Large Stone Structure, Stepped Stone Structure, Fortress walls from Canaanite and First Temple periods, residential buildings from various periods, sections of Second Temple "pilgrim's road" in central valley
1978–1985	Yigal Shiloh	Hebrew University, IAA	Dating and detailed study of water system, more of Stepped Stone Structure, First Temple Period residences in Area G, "The Burnt Room" with arrowheads, bullae including the "Gemaryahu ben Shafan" bulla
1995	Ronnie Reich and Eli Shukron	El Ad / IAA	The Spring House above the Gihon

== Bibliography ==
- Margreet Steiner, 2016, From Jerusalem with Love, History, Archaeology and The Bible Forty Years After “Historicity”. Changing Perspectives 6, edited by Ingrid Hjelm and Thomas L. Thompson, Routledge, pp. 71–84
- Margreet Steiner, 2014, One Hundred and Fifty Years of Excavating Jerusalem Bart Wagemakers (ed.), Archaeology in the Land of `Tells and Ruins’. A History of Excavations in the Holy Land Inspired by the Photographs and Accounts of Leo Boer. Oxbow Books, Oxford.
