= Zachi Dvira =

Israeli archaeologist

- יצחק דבירה
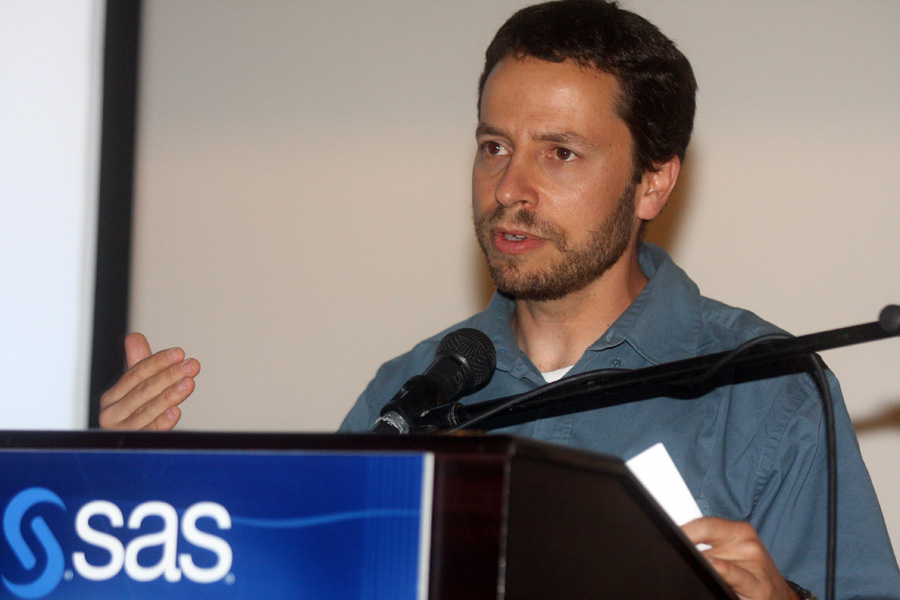
- Education: Bar-Ilan University
- Scientific career
- Fields: Archeology

Zachi (Yitzhak) Dvira (Hebrew: יצחק דבירה; formerly Zachi Zweig) is an Israeli archaeologist. He co-directs the Temple Mount Sifting Project and was the first person to recognize the archaeological importance of the debris removed from Temple Mount. He initiated a project for systematic sifting of it.

== Biography ==
In 1999, Yitzhak (Zachi) Dvira was a student of archaeology at Bar-Ilan University. Together with fellow student Aran Yardeni, he and a group of friends began examining the construction rubble dumped by the Islamic Waqf during the Construction of el-Marwani Mosque (1996–1999). They were stopped by inspectors from the Israel Antiquities Authority but managed to retrieve a few artifacts from the dump and displayed them at a conference about new studies on Jerusalem. Their report set off a storm in the conference hall. The Antiquities Authority claimed they were antiquities robbers, although the archaeologists in attendance supported them and protested against the archaeological destruction of the Temple Mount.

A few days later Dvira's house was raided by the Antiquities Authority theft unit. He was detained by the police and accused of conducting antiquities robbery. Charges were pressed against him, but the court dismissed the charges.

== Archaeology career ==
=== Temple Mount Sifting Project ===
Gabriel Barkay, one of Israel’s most senior archaeologists, joined forces with Zachi Dvira, and together they organized a project for systematically sifting the debris from the Temple Mount. Since the Temple Mount has never been excavated, the artifacts retrieved from the debris could still provide valuable information, even though they are out of context. Most artifacts can be identified and dated by comparison with artifacts found elsewhere in Israel. They raised funds and spent 5 years getting a license to conduct an archaeological dig. In 2004 they obtained the license and 285 truckloads of rubble were moved to a vacant lot on the slopes of Jerusalem's Mount Scopus, where Dvira directs a dig that sifts and examines every bucketful of dirt and rubble removed from the Temple Mount.

The first coin discovered was issued during the First Jewish–Roman War that preceded the Roman destruction of the temple in Jerusalem in 70 C.E. The ancient Jewish coin is stamped with the Hebrew words "Freedom of Zion."

The most valuable find so far may be a clay seal impression. The incomplete Hebrew lettering appears to show the name Ge'aliyahu, son of Immer. Immer is the name of a family of temple officials mentioned in Jeremiah 20:1.

Dvira has found remains of structures that existed on the Temple Mount during the Byzantine era, which appears to disprove the claim that the site was abandoned in that period. Major evidence were retrieved by Dvira from the British Mandate Antiquities Department archive. His dating of the mosaics found by Hamilton to the Byzantine period has been contradicted though by fellow archaeologists in 2018, who date them to the Umayyad period based on their similarity with mosaics excavated in Umayyad Palace III next to the Temple Mount's southern wall.

== See also ==
- Archaeology of Israel
- Temple Mount Sifting Project
