= Gabriel Barkay =

Israeli archaeologist (1944–2026)

- גבריאל ברקאי
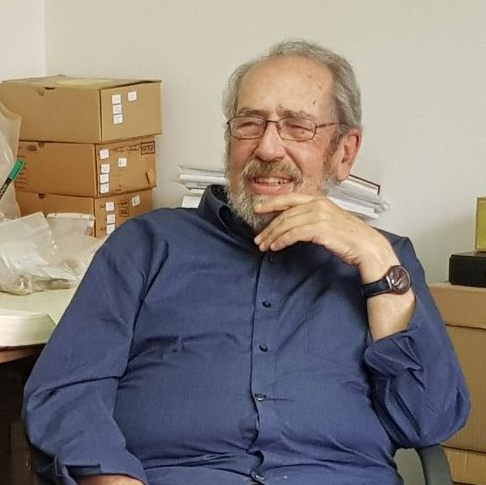
- Barkay in 2017
- Born: Breslauer Gábor; 20 June 1944; Budapest, Hungary
- Died: 11 January 2026 (aged 81)
- Citizenship: Israel
- Education: Tel Aviv University
- Occupation: Archaeologist
- Employer(s): Bar-Ilan University, Hebrew University, American Institute of Holy Land Studies and University of the Holy Land
- Title: Professor
- Awards: Jerusalem Prize for Archaeological Research (1996)

Gabriel Barkay (né Breslauer Gábor; Hebrew: גבריאל ברקאי; sometimes transcribed from the Hebrew Gavriel Barkai; 20 June 1944 – 11 January 2026) was an Israeli archaeologist whose research and fieldwork focused on the archaeology of Jerusalem. He was a professor and lecturer at several academic institutions, and a prominent public figure in the archaeology of Israel.

Barkay is perhaps best known for his discovery of the Ketef Hinnom amulets, two inscribed silver scrolls dating to the 7th century BCE that preserve a version of the priestly benediction from the Book of Numbers. These amulets, found in rock-cut tombs from the kingdom of Judah, are among the earliest known extra-biblical examples of biblical passages. Additionally, Barkay was a co-founder of the Temple Mount Sifting Project, which sought to recover and document archaeological material from soil removed from the Temple Mount.

Over the course of his career, he received multiple honors for his contributions to the archaeology of Jerusalem, including the Jerusalem Prize for Archaeological Research, the Moskowitz Prize for Zionism, and the Yakir Yerushalaim Award. His work was cited in both academic scholarship and popular media. The New York Times described him as "a leading figure in biblical archaeology" and "one of Israel's leading archaeologists."

== Early life and training ==
Gabriel Barkay was born Gabriel (Gábor) Breslauer in Nazi-occupied Budapest, Hungary, on 20 June 1944. He and his mother, Rozsa (Ligeti) Breslauer, barely escaped a death march to Vienna because of the liberation of Budapest by Soviet troops in January 1945. His father, Eliezer Breslauer, had been sent to a camp in Ukraine but survived and later rejoined the family. He and his family immigrated to Israel in 1950.

At ten years of age, he joined the Israel Exploration Society and attended the organization's conference in Ramat Rachel in 1956, when four Jordanian soldiers shot across the border and killed four attendees. From 1964 to 1967 he was an undergraduate at Hebrew University of Jerusalem, where he studied archaeology, comparative religion and geography under Yigael Yadin, Benjamin Mazar, Michael Avi-Yonah, Yohanan Aharoni, Ruth Amiran, David Flusser Nahman Avigad and Moshe Stekelis, among others. There he received his bachelor's degree summa cum laude and began his master's degree.

Later he studied at Tel Aviv University, and received his PhD summa cum laude in archaeology in 1985. His dissertation was about LMLK seal impressions on jar handles. He participated in the Lachish excavations with David Ussishkin. His academic areas of interest included the archaeology of Jerusalem, biblical archaeology, burials and burial customs, art, epigraphy, and glyptics in the Iron Age.

== Teaching and academic career ==
Barkay was an external lecturer at Bar Ilan University and Jerusalem University College on Mount Zion. He was a public figure who delivered lectures to the wider public and trained tour guides in Jerusalem.

== Archaeology career ==
=== First Temple Period tombs ===
In 1968–71, Barkay and David Ussishkin surveyed the Silwan necropolis from the time of the Judean Monarchy during the Iron Age, containing 50 rock-cut tombs of Judahite high government officials. Barkay also excavated the Iron Age tombs on the grounds of the École Biblique in the early 1970s.

=== Priestly Blessing scrolls ===
Barkay's most famous discoveries were two small silver scroll amulets containing the priestly benediction from the Book of Numbers (Numbers 6:24–26), which he discovered in 1979 in a First Temple Period tomb at Ketef Hinnom. These amulets contain the oldest surviving biblically related inscription discovered to date, dating back to the seventh century BCE and are to date the only archaeological proof that passages from the Hebrew Bible as we know them were in circulation during the First Temple Period.

=== Temple Mount excavations ===
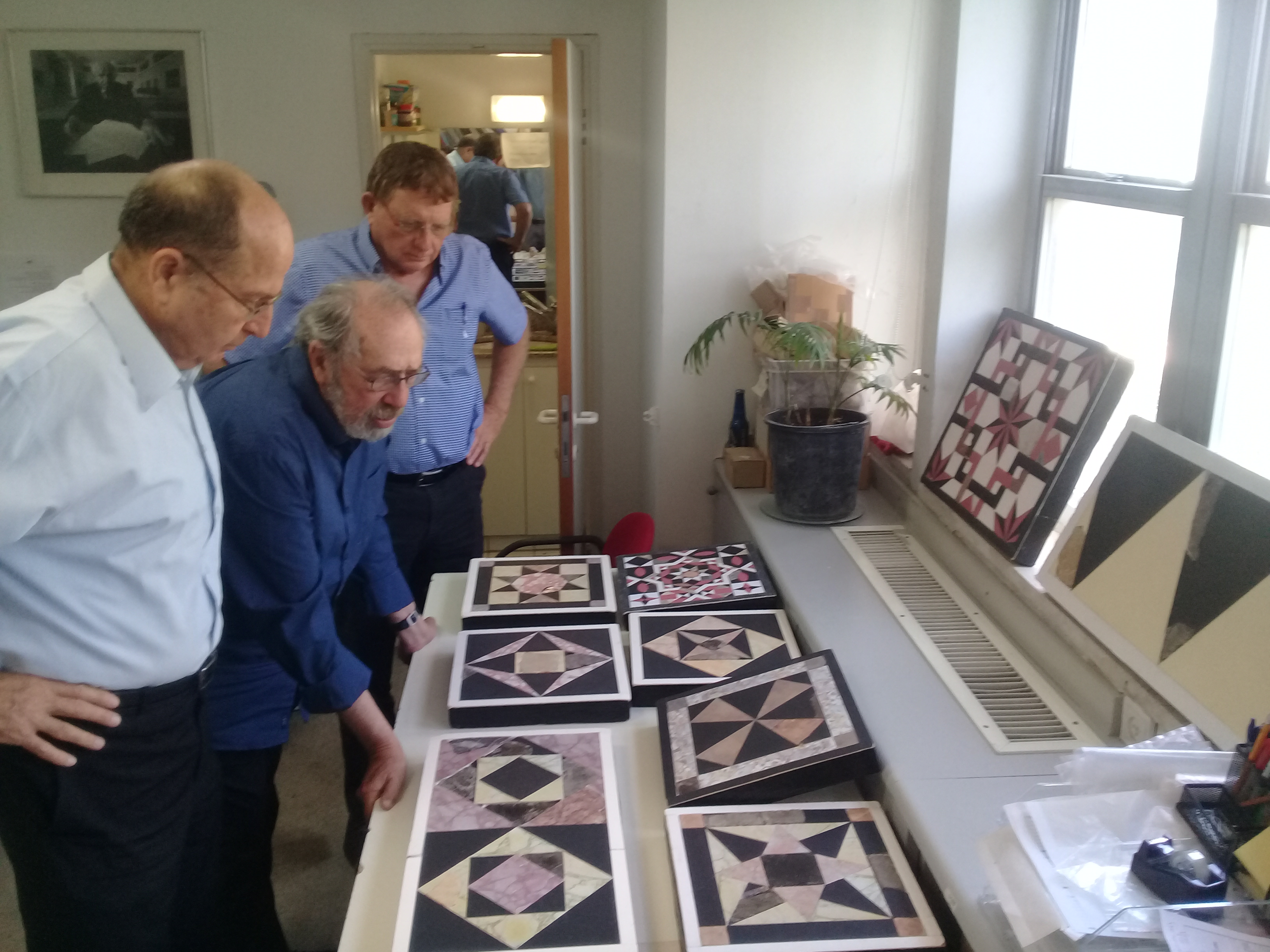
Barkay with Moshe Ya'alon

In 2000, Barkay, Eilat Mazar, and other prominent individuals in Israel founded the Committee for the Prevention of Destruction of Antiquities on the Temple Mount in response to a protruding bulge discovered in 2000 in the Temple Mount's southwest corner.

In 2005, together with archaeologist Zachi Zweig, Barkay established the Temple Mount Sifting Project, a project funded by the Ir David Foundation and dedicated to recovering archaeological artifacts from 400 truckloads of earth removed from the Temple Mount by the Waqf and Israeli Islamic movement during 1996–2001. The construction included the establishment of the underground El-Marwani Mosque at an ancient structure known since medieval times as Solomon's Stables, including the excavation of a huge pit as an entrance to the structure, and reducing the platform level at the area north to the entrance.

One of the findings of this project is a 7th-century BCE bulla (round clay seal affixed to documents), which became known as the "Bethlehem Seal". Dr. Barkay offered the first translation of the Hebrew three-line inscription: "In the 7th year, Bethlehem, for the king".

Barkay points to the findings from the Byzantine period—mainly ceramics and coins, including rare coins, but also architectural elements, some from churches. Some scholars claim that the Temple Mount was left bare by the Christian rulers, to conform with Jesus' prophecy that not a stone of the Temple complex will be left standing (Mark 13:2, Luke 21:6, Matthew 24:2) and in order to emphasise the Church of the Resurrection, but in Barkay's assessment, the findings prove that "in the Byzantine era the Temple Mount was a center of activity", as the place may have held churches and a marketplace.

== Media career ==
Barkay frequently appeared on the History Channel show The Naked Archaeologist, hosted by Simcha Jacobovici. He also appeared in the documentary The Real Da Vinci Code in 2005, hosted by British actor Tony Robinson of Blackadder fame, offering his views on the speculation that the Templars found secret documents relating to the bloodline of Jesus Christ under the Temple Mount as advanced by Michael Baigent, Richard Leigh, and Henry Lincoln in their controversial book The Holy Blood and the Holy Grail. In Barkay's opinion, there exists no evidence that the Templars conducted any excavations in the area at all, and that the tools available to them at the time were not sufficient to dig far enough to reach the ruins in question. Also in 2005, Barkay appeared in the documentary The Bible vs. the Book of Mormon, produced by Living Hope Ministries of Brigham City, Utah, in which he was asked to give his opinion on the extent to which archaeological findings support the historical narrative presented in the Bible.

== Death ==
Barkay died on 11 January 2026, at the age of 81. According to his daughter, the cause as "complications of an autoimmune disease."

== Awards and recognition ==
In 1996, Barkay received the Jerusalem Prize for his life's work as an archaeologist of Jerusalem.

In 2014 he received the Moskowitz Prize for Zionism.

In 2018, he received the Yakir Yerushalayim award.
