= Mazar =

Mazar or Al-Mazar may refer to:

== Places ==
=== Afghanistan ===
- Mazar, Afghanistan, village in Balkh Province
- Mazar-i-Sharif, city

=== China ===
- Mazar, Xinjiang, a farm in Taxkorgan Tajik Autonomous County
- Mazar Pass on China National Highway 219, near Mazar, Xinjiang

=== Iran ===
- Mazar, Arzuiyeh, Kerman Province
- Mazar, Baft, Kerman Province
- Mazar, Markazi
- Mazar, Razavi Khorasan
- Mazar, South Khorasan
- Mazar, Vakilabad, Arzuiyeh County, Kerman Province
- Mazar, Zirkuh, South Khorasan Province

=== Israel ===
- Al-Mazar, Haifa

=== Jordan ===
- Al Mazar al Shamali ('Northern Mazar')
- Al-Mazār al-Janūbī ('Southern Mazar')

=== Palestine (West Bank) ===
- Al-Mazar, Jenin

=== Pakistan ===
- Mazar-e-Quaid

=== Uzbekistan ===
- Almazar (town)

== Other ==
- Mazar (mausoleum), Muslim mausoleum or shrine
- Mazar (toponymy), a component of Arabic toponyms literally meaning shrine, grave, tomb, etc.
- Mazar (surname)
- Mazars, a French-based professional services company

== See also ==
- Mazari (disambiguation)
- Mazer (disambiguation)
- Mazor (disambiguation)
- Al-Muzayri'a, former Arab Palestinian village
- Muzayraa, Syria
