= Solomon's Porch =

Colonnade in the Second Temple

Solomon's Porch, Portico or Colonnade (στοα του Σολομωντος; John 10:23; Acts 3:11; 5:12), was a colonnade or cloister, located on the eastern side of the Temple's Outer Court (Women's Court) in Jerusalem, named after Solomon, King of Israel, and not to be confused with the Royal Stoa, which was on the southern side of Herod's Temple.

== Description ==
Titus Flavius Josephus, a Jewish historian who lived in Jerusalem during the 1st century AD and was present at its destruction by the Romans in 70 AD, speaks of the wall and of the cloister or porch that King Solomon built east of the Temple House:

NOW this temple, as I have already said, was built upon a strong hill. At first the plain at the top was hardly sufficient for the holy house and the altar, for the ground about it was very uneven, and like a precipice; but when King Solomon, who was the person that built the temple, had built a wall to it on its east side, there was then added one cloister founded on a bank cast up for it, and on the other parts the holy house stood naked.

As witnessed by Josephus, the exact dimensions of Herod's Temple formed a perfect square - a furlong (c.185 meters) by a furlong on all four sides. On the east wall was a double cloister, porch, which in later times is referred to as Solomon's porch.

“This hill was walled all round, and in compass four furlongs, [the distance of] each angle containing in length a furlong: but within this wall, and on the very top of all, there ran another wall of stone also, having, on the east quarter, a double cloister, of the same length with the wall; in the midst of which was the temple itself. This cloister looked to the gates of the temple; and it had been adorned by many kings in former times; and round about the entire temple were fixed the spoils taken from barbarous nations; all these had been dedicated to the temple by Herod, with the addition of those he had taken from the Arabians.”

The historic writings of Josephus give an eyewitness account to the First and Second Temples, as well as Herod's Temple, all shared the same fore-mentioned east wall of the Temple complex. The east boundary line of the Temple complex never changed. Josephus was clear that Herod refused to let his builders make any changes in the ancient works of the east wall because of the great expense. Herod allowed the construction of new courts on the north, west and south sides of the Temple but the east wall remained intact and undisturbed.

== Location ==
The location of Solomon's First Temple, and Zerubbabel and Herod's Second Temple site, has remained a mystery for almost two thousand years. All were built on the threshing floor bought by King David. Finding the location of Herod's Temple would help us to locate Solomon's Porch. The location of the Temple has been a divisive subject. There have been many discrepancies concerning the size of Herod's Temple complex and where it was situated on the Temple Mount. The historical evidence does not support the idea of the whole Temple Mount as being Herod's extended courts to the North, West and South, as per the Dome of the Rock platform theories suggest. In these theories Herod's extended Temple courts would be almost triple the size of the furlong by furlong description of the Temple given by Josephus. Once the actual location of the Temple on the Mount is understood then also the location, and size, of Solomon's Porch/Portico will be revealed.

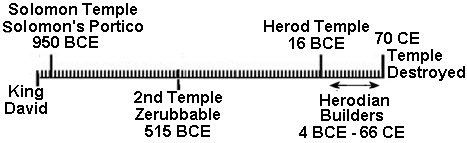
Temple Timeline

Historical evidence suggests a Triple Gate connection

This connection to Triple gate as Solomon Porch is shown in the maps of the 19th Century Explorations of the Temple Mount. During the 19th century Muslim rulers allowed various archaeological expeditions to take place in Jerusalem. Some were funded by The Palestine Exploration Fund (PEF) and the Ordnance Survey of Jerusalem.

Among the early explorers of Palestine were men like Titus Tobler who conducted an expedition in the 1840s. The account of James Ferguson is found in An Essay on the Ancient Topography of Jerusalem, published in 1847. Thomas Lewin ESQ., authored Siege of Jerusalem by Titus, in 1863. Captain Charles Wilson documented the Ordnance Survey of Jerusalem in 1886. In an effort to identify the location of the first and second Temple site, these scientists relied heavily on the Jewish Mishna and the historical writings of Josephus. They also conducted and documented their own extensive research which included detailed topographical maps of both Jerusalem and the Temple Mount. The maps drawn by these early explorers show the Temple of Herod as being a furlong by a furlong square, stretching 606 feet in each direction from the SW corner of the Temple Mount with its east wall landing on a substructure called Triple Gate. A collection of these maps can be viewed here.

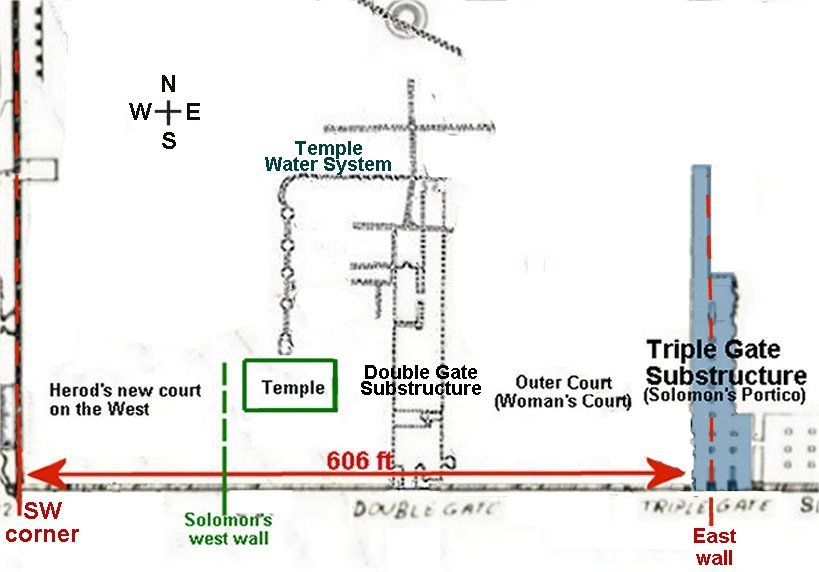
Temple Location

== Trumpeting Stone Helps to Verify Southwest Corner as Included in Herod's Temple ==
In 1968, Archaeologist Benjamin Mazar made a notorious find at the base of the SW corner of the Temple Mount, which further identifies the location of Herod's Temple Complex. The discovery of the Trumpeting Place confirms that the existing SW corner of the mount was part of Herod's 606 x 606 ft temple complex, as described by Josephus. The trumpeting stone fell during the destruction of the Temple in 70 CE, cracking the pavement stones of the first-century street below.

As of 2016, clear evidence of two particular sets of blocked gates can be seen in the southern wall of the Temple Mount. These are known as the Double Gate and the Triple Gate.

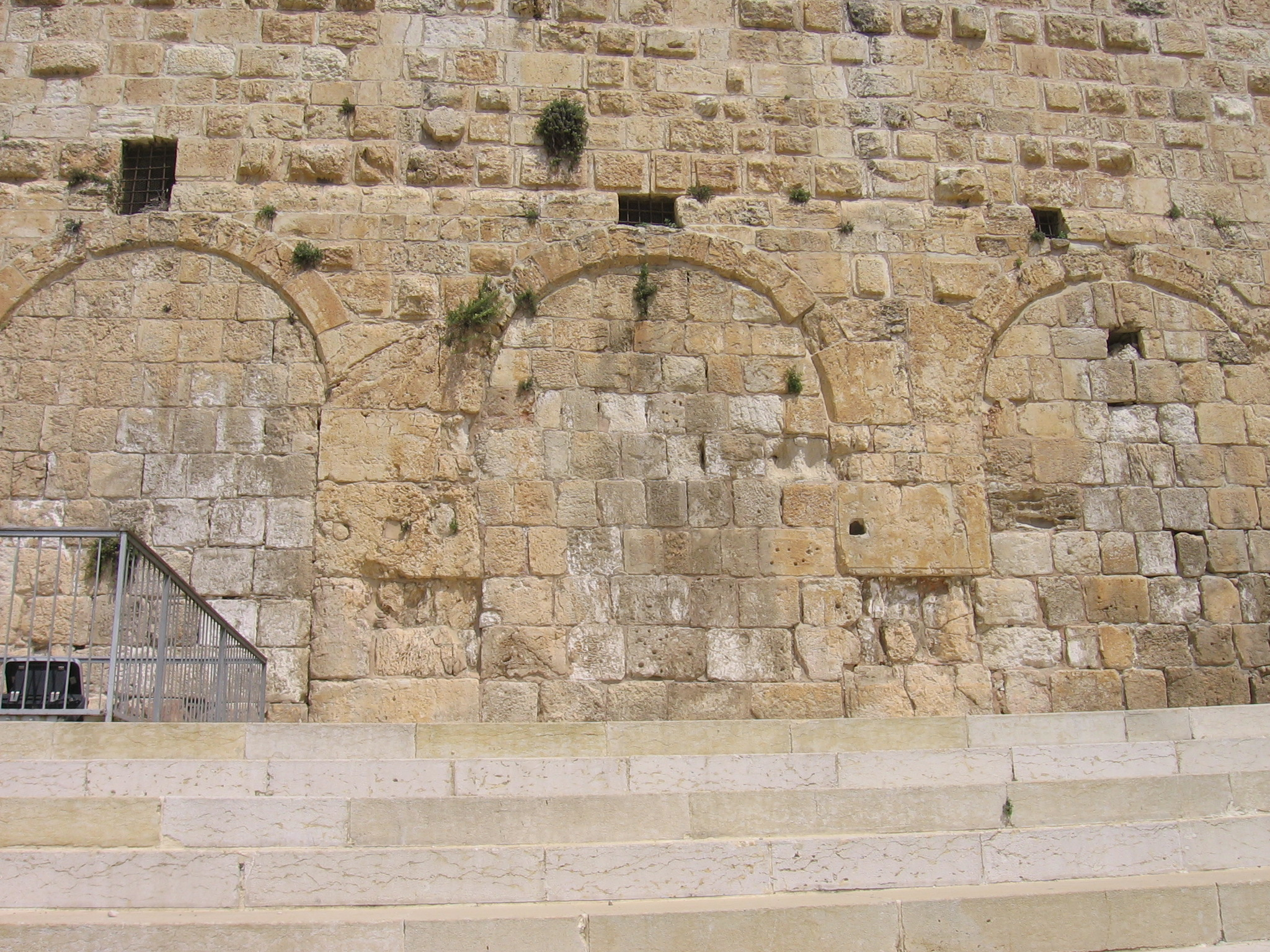
Triple Gate Arches

=== Triple Gate ===
The three arches of Triple Gate are not the original gates to the great halls within. In regards to the sealing of the gates, many scholars teach that these arches were blocked up by the Crusaders. Some believe they were blocked during the Muslim rule of Sultan Suleiman.

Double Gate is closer to the SW corner of the Temple Mount. The triple arches, closer to the SE corner of the Temple Mount, are called “Triple Gate”. Both sets of gates are currently below ground level of the Mount. This was not always the case. Before the destruction of Herod's Temple, (which existed from 16 BCE – 70 CE) the ground level of the southern section of the Temple Mount (below the Al Aqsa Mosque) was approximately 30–40 feet lower than it is today. Temple Mount expert, Norma Robertson, details this research in Locating Solomon's Temple.

Josephus verifies that the porch, or “cloisters”, east of the Holy House and east of the outer court (Woman's Court), along the east wall of Solomon's and Herod's Temple complex, were indeed built by King Solomon - Solomon's Porch.

"These cloisters belonged to the outer court, and were situated in a deep valley, and had walls that reached four hundred cubits [in length], and were built of square and very white stones, the length of each of which stones was twenty cubits, and their height six cubits. This was the work of King Solomon, who first of all built the entire temple"

As seen in the diagram above, the *outer court was also the Women's Court which extended to the east wall of the Temple complex. Solomon's Porch belonged to, or was joined to, the Woman's Court and contained the East Gate to the Temple complex.

Explorer James Barclay accessed the subterranean ruins of Triple Gate in 1844. His diagrams and descriptions of the ancient structure reveal evidence of its three great halls. His research is documented in The City of the Great King, 1858, p. 509. Of particular importance is the fact that Barclay testified that all of the piers in Triple Gate could be dated “back to the time of Solomon”. He went on to conclude that the vaulted, arched ceilings, in the underground halls were added to the ancient piers at a later date.

Using Barclay's and Norma Robertson's research, we can assume that approx 606 feet (one Greek furlong) from the SW corner of the Temple Mount, and approx 40 feet below the current ground level of the Mount, one would find three, now blocked up, arched entryways in the south wall. Behind those arches are the great halls of Triple Gate with its foundation piers originally built by Solomon.

=== Triple Gate as one of the Huldah Gates? ===
Some biblical scholars assume that Triple Gate and Double Gate were two passageways leading up to the Temple Mount. The historic record gives no evidence of this being the case. In fact, Josephus writes that there was only one gate located in the middle of the southern wall of the Temple. The claim that Triple Gate and Double Gate were passageways leading up to the surface of the Temple Mount, is a complete fabrication, not mentioned in any of the historical records, including the Mishna. According to the evidence, Triple Gate is situated on the east wall of Herod's Temple, exactly where Solomon's Porch would have been located.

=== Triple Gate not to be confused with “Solomon's Stables” ===
East of Triple Gate and beyond the east wall of the Temple House, in the far SE corner of the Temple Mount, are the terraced substructures referred to as “Solomon's Stables”, a name given to this substructure by the Crusaders in the 12th century, because it is where they stabled their horses. When Solomon built his porch, east of the Temple House, this section of the Temple Mount rectangle did not exist. This would have been the area described by Josephus as being “like a precipice” with a steep decline down into the Kidron Valley. These terraced underground vaults were not part of Solomon's Temple, or Zerubbabel's Second Temple, or Herod's Temple. This may have been built by Herod's heirs, some time after his death. Archaeologists have identified the stones used in the construction of the vaults as being recycled stones from Herod's era. Given this evidence, some believe this substructure to have been built by Emperor Hadrian when he built the Temple of Jupiter, on the Temple Mount, in 135 C.E.

== Conclusion ==
If the piers were placed there by Solomon, then this would have been the same location of the “banks” a retaining wall used to raise up the ground level, as a foundation for the porch. According to Josephus, this and the “east wall” were indeed built by Solomon. Evidence suggests that the magnificent halls of Triple Gate might have been the triple-aisled, open-aired, portico that Solomon, King of Israel, added along the east wall of the Temple's Outer Court in 950 B.C. If this is true, the Triple Gate connection gives us an important key in unlocking the mystery of the location of Solomon's Porch and the Holy House.

At the time of this writing, the Triple Gate Halls are in ruin and full of rubble. Despite their condition, there is proof that Solomon laid the foundation and built the piers that support the partial ruins. This makes Triple Gate a possible candidate for actually being Solomon's Porch, and unlocking the ultimate mystery of the Temple locations.
