= Mazari =

Mazari may refer to:

== Tribes ==
- Mazari (Arab tribe), a Bedouin tribe of the United Arab Emirates and Oman
- Mazari (Baloch tribe), a Baloch tribe settled in Rajanpur and Sindh, Pakistan

== People ==
- A member of the Mazari political family in Pakistan
- A local of Mazar-e-Sharif city in northern Afghanistan
- Abdul Ali Mazari, Afghan Hazara leader of Hizb-e-Wahdat
- Shireen Mazari, Pakistani political analyst

== Places ==
- Mazari, SBS Nagar, a village in Punjab, India

== Others ==
- Hamza Ali Mazari, protagonist of the 2025 Indian film Dhurandhar, portrayed by Ranveer Singh

== See also ==
- Mazar (disambiguation)
