= Monastery of the Virgins =

Structure uncovered during Benjamin Mazar's excavations south of Jerusalem's Temple Mount

- Interactive map of Monastery of the Virgins
- 31.775808°N 35.236797°E
- Type: Possible monastery
- Periods: Byzantine

History
- Built: 4th century
- Abandoned: 614

Site notes
- Material: Stone
- Excavation dates: 1968–1977
- Archaeologists: Benjamin Mazar
- Condition: ruin, archaeological park
- Public access: yes

The Monastery of the Virgins is a structure uncovered during Benjamin Mazar's excavations south of Jerusalem's Temple Mount. The large number of Christian religious finds from the site have prompted its identification with a monastery described by a pilgrim, Theodosius the archdeacon, in his De Situ Terrae Sanctae, a work of the early 6th century. The building was constructed in the 4th century on the remains of an earlier Herodian building identified with the Second Temple courthouse, and was destroyed during the Persian sack of Jerusalem in 614.

== Excavations ==
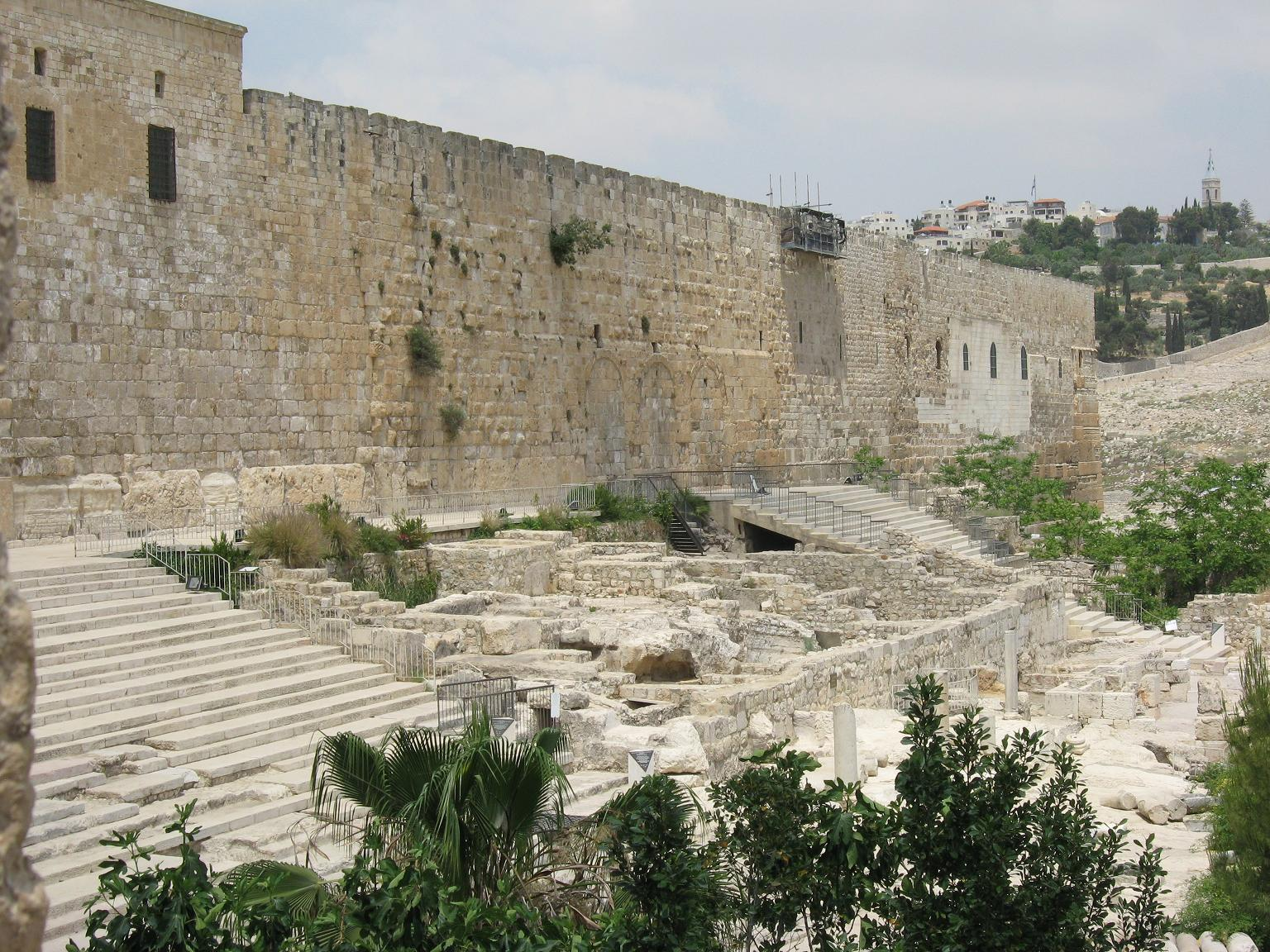
The southern Wall of the Temple Mount. The Monastery of the Virgins lies beyond steps leading up to the Triple Huldah Gate

The building identified as the Monastery of the Virgins was unearthed in Area XV of Mazar's excavations of the Ophel on behalf of the Hebrew University of Jerusalem. Carried out between 1968 and 1977, the excavations revealed that a crowded residential neighbourhood stood in the area to the immediate south of the Temple Mount enclosure during Jerusalem's Byzantine period.

10 metres (33 ft) from the Triple Huldah Gate, at the foot of the Temple Mount's southern wall, the excavators revealed a structure whose plan resembled a typical Byzantine courtyard house, with wings arranged around a central courtyard. Built on top in the remains of a large Second Temple Period building and an older burial cave, the house featured three stories of which the basement and ground floor were well preserved. The excavation of the building yielded earlier Iron Age II shards, including a LMLK seal and the head of a fertility figurine. However, as a result of the building's excellent state of preservation digging beneath its floors was abandoned in order to allow its display to the public.

Measuring 17.9 metres (59 ft) by 17.3 metres (57 ft), the structure was built in the early 4th century as a single spacious unit. Its ground floor included the courtyard, a kitchen, shops and staircases leading to the basement and the floor above, which housed a chapel. In the mid-6th century the northern and southern wings of its ground floor were modified and sealed off from the rest of the building.

A destruction layer testifies to the destruction of the building in a great conflagration, probably during the Persian sack of the city in 614. In the destruction layer were found the remnants of the upper floor, which collapsed into the floor below. The remains of weapons, probably the defenders', were also found at the site. These include a sword, a scabbard, a pickaxe, a dagger and an umbo, a rare feature of the Byzantine weapons repertoire.

While adjacent areas were built over during the subsequent Islamic periods, the building in area XV was left undisturbed. This allowed for its excellent state of preservation. It is currently accessible to visitors to the Jerusalem Archaeological Park at the foot of the Al-Aqsa Mosque.

=== Finds ===
Multiple items of ecclesiastical nature were found in the structure. These include fragments of marble chancel screens, an altar table and a Second-Temple era stone ossuary in use as a reliquary and containing a skull. Crosses were ubiquitous, including on roof tiles, oil lamps, door knockers, and several bronze crosses, one of which was 65 centimetres (26 in) in length. Several fragments of a chancel screen depict two deer, Christian symbols of faith and devotion mentioned in Psalm 42:2, facing a cross planted on the Hill of Golgotha. A stone lintel was found depicting a cross enclosed within a wreath.

Additional finds include copper alloy chains and incense bowls, copper alloy lock and clasps decorated with the image of an arched entrance to a church, a sinuous dragon-headed arm from a multi-armed copper candelabra, and a copper hearth with decorative animal legs complete with rings for suspension.

In the northern section of the building which included the kitchen and several storage rooms, were found multiple storage jars. In some of these were found remnants of the food they once contained, including lentil and chickpea.

== Identification ==
=== Monastery of the Virgins ===
The large number of Christian items found in the structure have led to its identification with a monastery described by Theodosius the archdeacon in his De Situ Terrae Sanctae ('On the Topography of the Holy Land'). Theodosius describes a monastery of nuns at the foot of the Temple Mount's southeastern corner:

Down below the pinnacle of the Temple is a monastery of virgins, and whenever one of them passes from this life, she is buried there inside the monastery. All their lives they never go out of the door by which they entered this place. The door is opened only for a nun or a penitent who wishes to join the monastery, but otherwise the virgins are always shut in. Their food is let down to them from the walls, but they have their water there in cisterns.

The excavators believe that the monastery had initially occupied the entire structure. In the 5th century, however, Jerusalem was granted patriarchal status and the following century saw the city develop and expand. As population density in Jerusalem grew, the needs of numerous pilgrims to the holy city led to a reduction in the monastery's area in favour of public facilities. In the mid-6th century, two wings were detached from the monastery and sealed off, the northern wing to act as a public kitchen and the southern converted into a row of shops. Food for the monastery was prepared in the public kitchen and delivered through two windows left open between the two sections of the building.

Adjacent buildings have aided the identification of the building as a monastery. 6 feet (1.8 m) from the Temple Mount wall, behind the monastery, stood a vaulted chamber with a sloping floor. This has been identified as a collection vat for wine, above which once stood a winery, a common feature of Byzantine monasteries. A two-story structure to the east of the monastery may have served as a hospice. Thirty well-preserved rooms were found on its ground floor, as was a red cross painted on a lintel in the building, and large watering pool on the outside.

While the building certainly was a monastery, certain finds nevertheless cast doubt on its identification with Theodosius' Monastery of the Virgins. Theodosius's description dates from the early 6th century, while the structural modifications isolating the central portion have only been dated to the mid 6th century, and possibly later. Furthermore, Greek inscriptions found in the building feature no women, only men, including one reading "for the offering and salvation of the Timotheus the priest".

The identification of the site with Theodosius' monastery was first proposed by Yizhar Hirschfeld. Yoram Tsafrir has suggested that the monastery may have been located on the slopes below of the Temple Mount which have not yet been excavated or even in the hollows of the Temple Mount itself, within Solomon's Stables. No evidence has been found to corroborate either suggestions.

=== Second Temple period courthouse ===
Underneath the coarse stones of the Byzantine walls, the walls of the monastery were built of large finely dressed stones, plastered and molded at the joints, a feature of Herodian construction. The monastery had been built over the remains of a large Second Temple-era building which had stood adjacent to a major entrance to the Herodian Temple Mount. Benjamin Mazar had suggested that this may have been a courthouse of the Sanhedrin, the supreme Jewish judicial and legislative body, a building referred to in the Mishnah, Tractate Sanhedrin 11.2. Additional support for this identification comes from a fragment of a Hebrew inscription found nearby. The inscription contained the word "[z]kenim" ('elders'), probably referring to the Sanhedrin.

== Publication ==
Although completed in 1977, the results of the Temple Mount excavations had not been published by Benjamin Mazar's death in 1995. In 1996, the Institute of Archaeology of the Hebrew University of Jerusalem authorized his granddaughter, Eilat Mazar, to publish the finds. Eilat Mazar had been her grandfather's research assistant, an area supervisor in the nearby City of David excavations, and had directed her own excavation in the Ophel in 1986-1987. The excavation report for area XV and the Monastery of the Virgins was finally published in 2003.
