= Maser (disambiguation) =

A maser is a device that produces coherent electromagnetic waves.

Maser may also refer to:

- Maser (rocket), a sounding rocket launched from Esrange in Sweden
- Maser, Veneto, a municipality in Italy
- Astrophysical maser, a naturally occurring source of stimulated spectral line emission
- Maser, a codename later used by the DC Comics character Air Wave

== People with the surname ==
- Mike Maser (1947–2019), an American football coach and player
- Werner Maser (1922–2007), German historian and author of books about Adolf Hitler

== See also ==
- Mazer (disambiguation)
