= Mazor (disambiguation) =

Mazor is a settlement in central Israel.

Mazor may also refer to:

== People ==
First name

- Mazor Bahaina (born 1973), Israeli rabbi and politician

Surname

- Gaby Mazor (born 1944), Israeli archaeologist
- Moran Mazor (born 1991), Israeli singer
- Stanley Mazor, American engineer

== Other ==
- Mazor Mausoleum, Roman period
- Mazor Robotics, an Israeli medical device company

== See also ==
- Mazur (disambiguation)
- Mazer (disambiguation)
- Mazar (disambiguation)
- Qizil-Mazor district, a former district in Tajikistan
