= Mazar (surname) =

Mazar is a surnames. Notable people with the surnames include:

- Amihai Mazar (born 1942), Israeli archeologist
- Benjamin Mazar (1906–1995), Israeli historian, archeologist, president of the Hebrew University of Jerusalem
- Debi Mazar (born 1964), American actress
- Eilat Mazar (1956–2021), Israeli archeologist
- Farida Mazar Spyropoulos (1871-1937), belly dancer
