= Southern Wall =

Wall of the Temple Mount in Jerusalem

Coordinates: 31°46′32.74″N 35°14′9.98″E

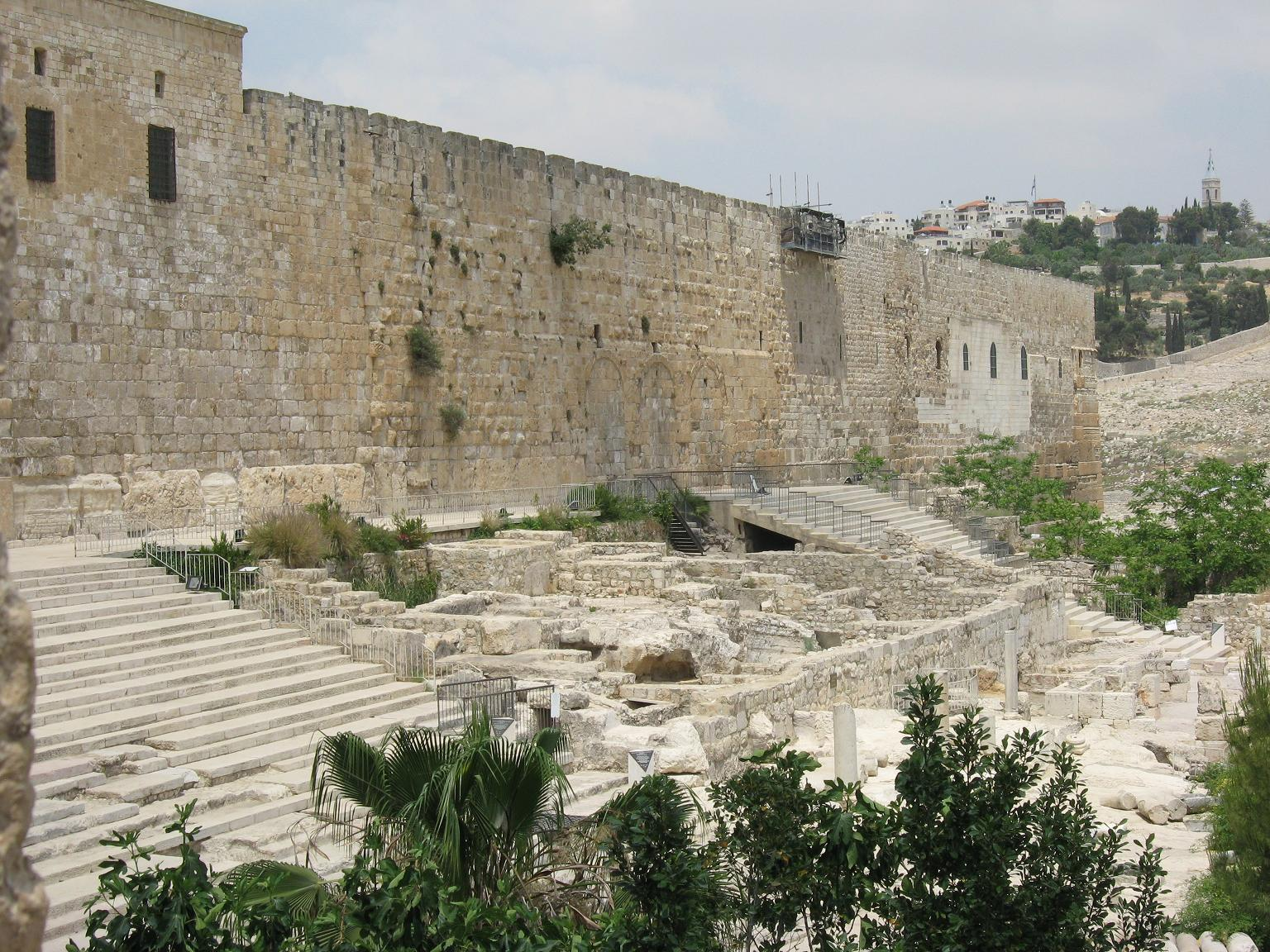
Eastern portion of the Southern Wall of the Temple Mount

The Southern Wall (Hebrew: הכותל הדרומי HaKotel HaDromi) is the retaining wall of the Temple Mount at the southern end. It was built during King Herod's expansion of the Temple Mount platform southward on to the Ophel.

== Construction ==
The Southern Wall is 922 feet (281 m) in length, and which the historian Josephus equates as being equal to the length of one furlong (Greek: stadion). Herod's southern extension of the Temple Mount is clearly visible from the east, standing on the Mount of Olives or to a visitor standing on top of the Temple mount as a slight change in the plane of the eastern wall, the so-called "Straight Joint." Herod's Royal Stoa stood atop this southern extension. The retaining wall is built of enormous blocks of Jerusalem stone, the face of each ashlar (block) is edged with a margin, the bossage is raised about 3/8" above the surrounding margins. The unmortared blocks are so finely fitted together that a knife blade cannot be inserted between the ashlars.

An enormous flight of steps leads to the Southern Wall from the south. They were excavated after 1967 by archaeologist Benjamin Mazar and are the northernmost extension of the pilgrims road leading from the Pool of Siloam to the Temple Mount via the Double Gate and the Triple Gate. These are the steps that Jesus of Nazareth and other Jews of his era walked up to approach the Temple, especially on the great pilgrimage festivals of Passover, Shavuot and Sukkot. The stairs that lead to the double gate are intact and "well-preserved." The steps that lead to the triple gate were mostly destroyed.

The risers are low, a mere 7 to 10 inches high, and each step is 12 to 35 inches deep, forcing the ascending pilgrims to walk with a stately, deliberate tread. The pilgrims entered the temple precincts through the double and triple gates still visible in the Southern Wall. Together, the double and triple gates are known as the Huldah Gates, after the prophetess Huldah.

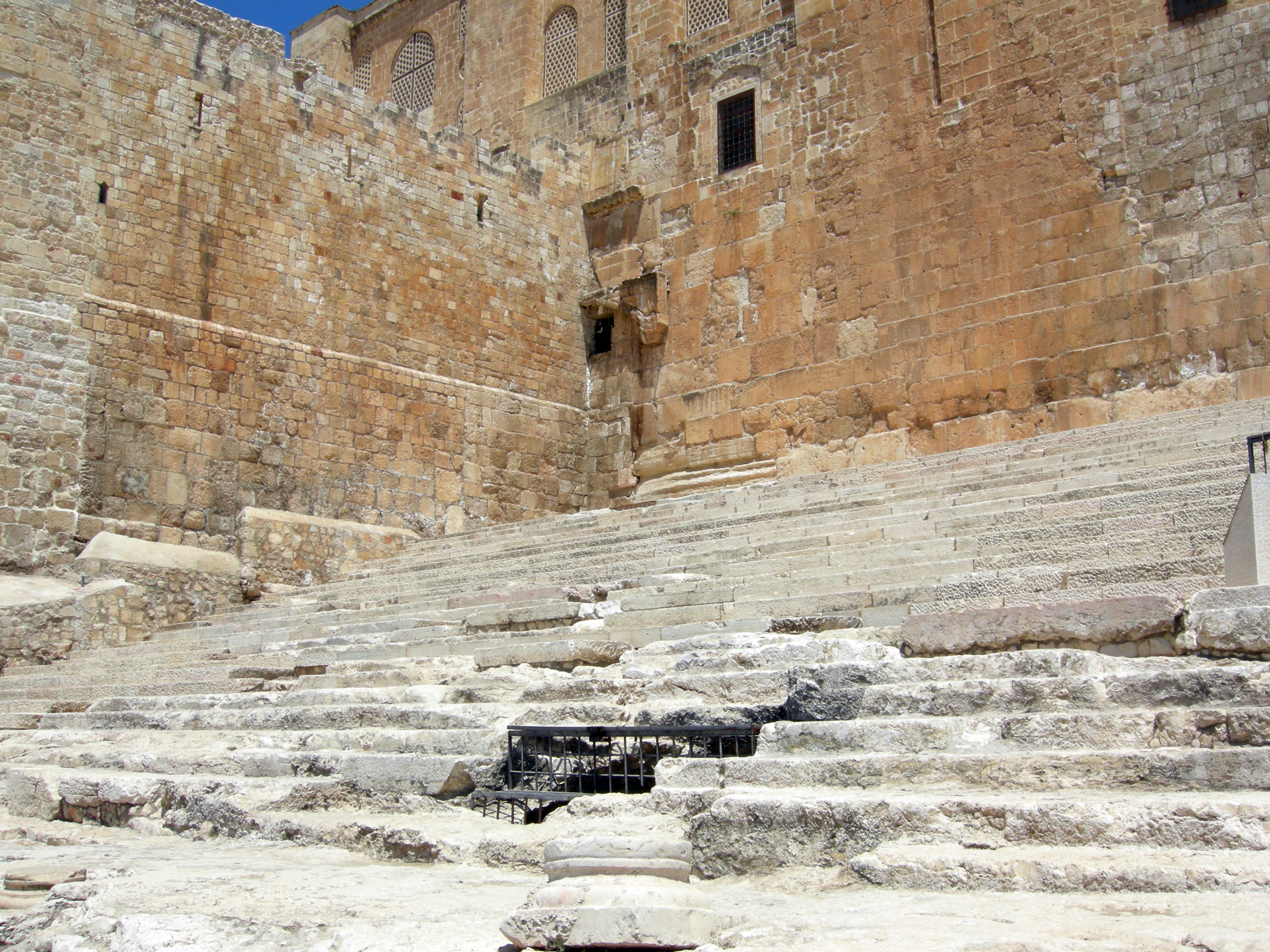
Pilgrim steps leading to the Double Gate

The present iteration of the Triple Gates is not Herodian. Each of the three gates measures at its width c. 4.03 metres (13.2 ft). The only Herodian element visible from the outside is the doorjamb on the bottom of the left-hand arch. The Double Gate is substantially concealed by a Crusader-era addition to the Temple Mount. Only half of the right-hand arch of the double gate is visible today from the outside, measuring at its exposed width 3.09 metres (10.1 ft). Over the part of the right-hand Herodian arched doorway that is visible is an ornate, decorative half-arch dating to the Umayyad period (661–750 CE). Just above it, the stub of an Herodian relieving arch is visible.

Inside the Temple Mount, much of the original staircase and the arched, elaborately carved Herodian ceilings survive. According to archaeologist Meir Ben-Dov, "On his way in and out of the Temple, Jesus must have walked here."

The internal parts of the Herodian Double Gate survive, although the waqf rarely permits visitors to see it. Pilgrims, upon entering the Double Gate (70 metres (230 ft) westward of the Triple Gates), were not immediately greeted by a wide-open courtyard. Rather, they continued to ascend a flight of stairs in a dome-shaped passageway carved into the rock which led up to the royal cloisters described by Josephus (Antiquities 15.11.5. [15.410]), cloisters which ran in a westerly-easterly direction along the full length of the Southern Wall, but which now lead up into the old section of the Al-Aqsa Mosque. The domed ceilings of the great staircases are carved with elaborate floral and geometric designs. Unlike the austere exterior gate, the interior of the gateway is elaborately decorated with ornately carved columns and ornamented domes. Two pairs of domes and their elaborate, surrounding columns survive intact. Intricately carved vines, rosettes, flowers and geometric patterns cover "every inch" of the "impressive" entry to the ancient Temple.

== Archaeology ==
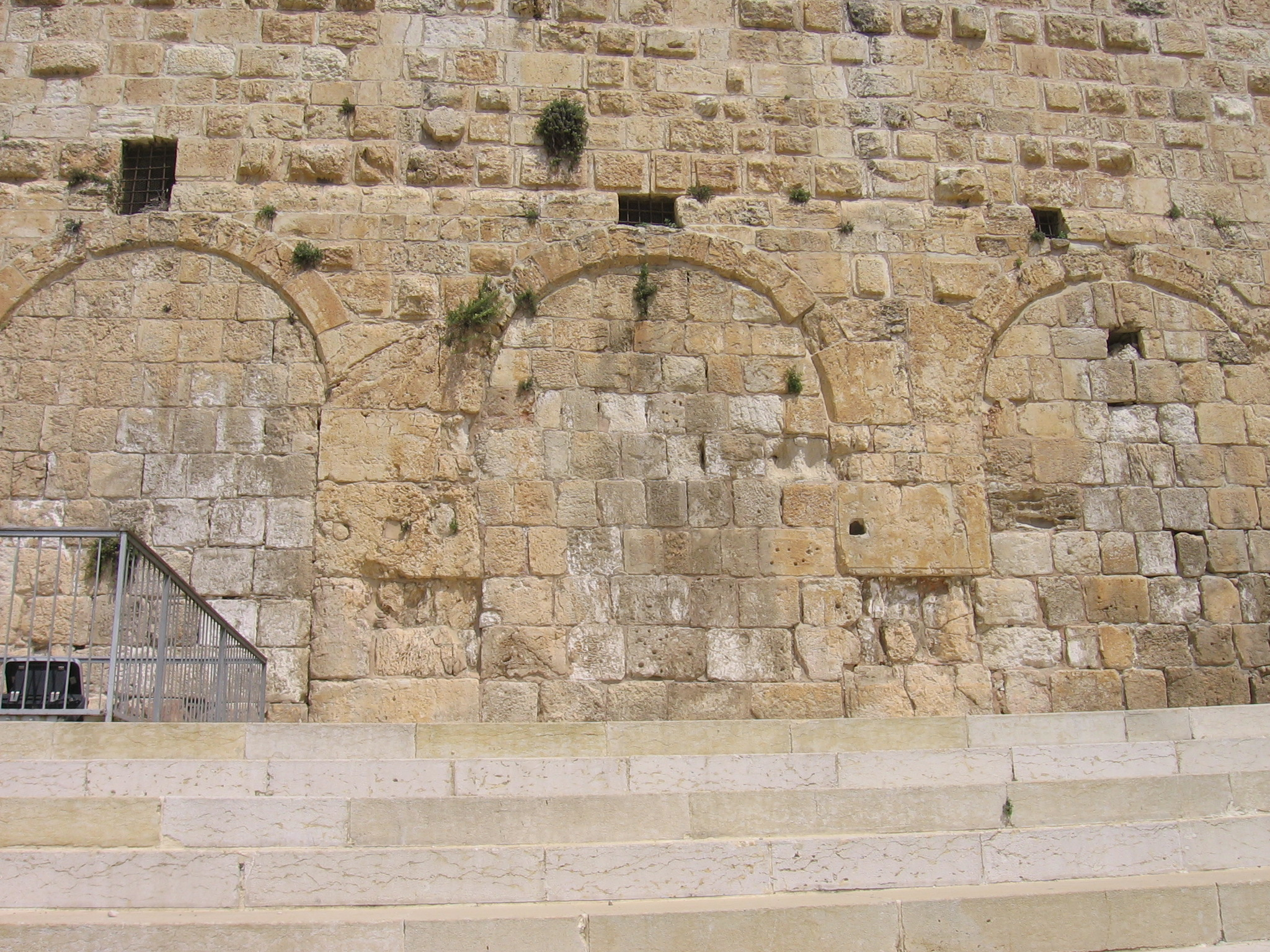
Eastern (triple) set of Hulda gates

In a post-1967 dig led by archaeologists Benjamin Mazar and Meir Ben-Dov, it was discovered that the Hulda gates led into a grand staircase and served as the principal entrance to the temple in the Roman period.

During the post-1967 digs, an elaborate group of Umayyad administration buildings and palaces were uncovered just outside the Southern Wall. They have been carefully preserved and are now part of an archaeological park. The Umayyad Caliphate is understood to have repaired damage to the Huldah Gates and Pilgrim stairs caused by the Roman destruction of Jerusalem in the year 70, in order to use them for access to the newly built Dome of the Rock.

=== Latin inscription ===
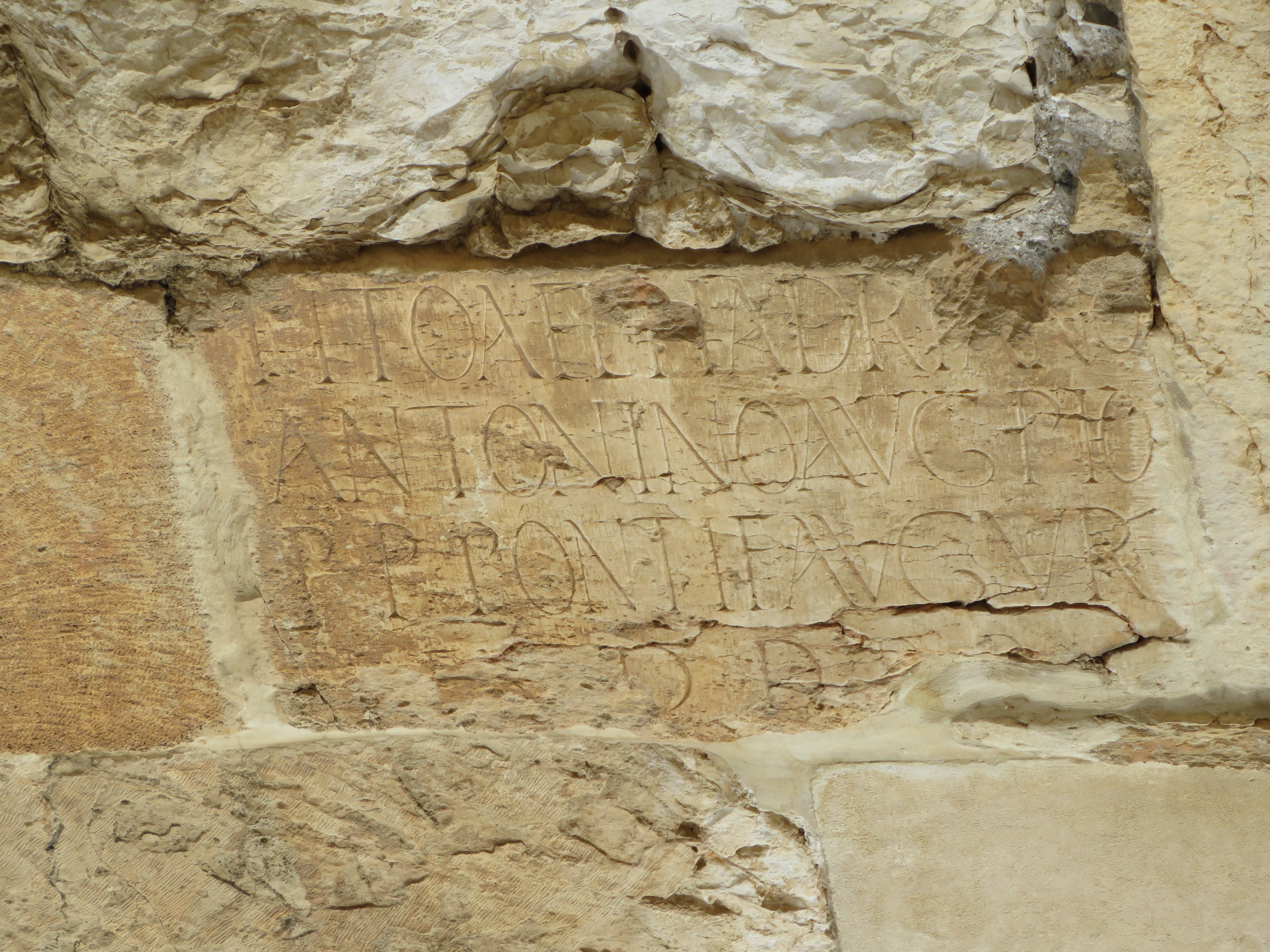
A reused marble slab with an inscription, that came from a statue of the emperor Antoninus Pius.

Near the Double Gate is a reused marble slab with an inscription, that came from a statue of the emperor Antoninus Pius (138–161 AD). The Latin inscription (placed upside-down, and with the usual abbreviations) reads:

TITO AEL HADRIANO ANTONINO AUG PIO P P PONTIF AUGUR D D	To Titus Ael[ius] Hadrianus Antoninus Aug[ustus] Pius the F[ather] of the F[atherland], Pontif[ex], Augur D[ecreed] by the D[ecurions]

This is a piece of stone from the base of the statue of Antoninus Pius, which stood in the Temple of Jupiter, built by the Romans in Aelia Capitolina on the Temple Mount platform. The Bordeaux Pilgrim in 333 mentions two statues of the emperor Hadrian. Researchers believe that the second of these statues was dedicated to Hadrian's successor, Antoninus Pius, during whom the construction of Aelia Capitolina continued.

== Repair work ==
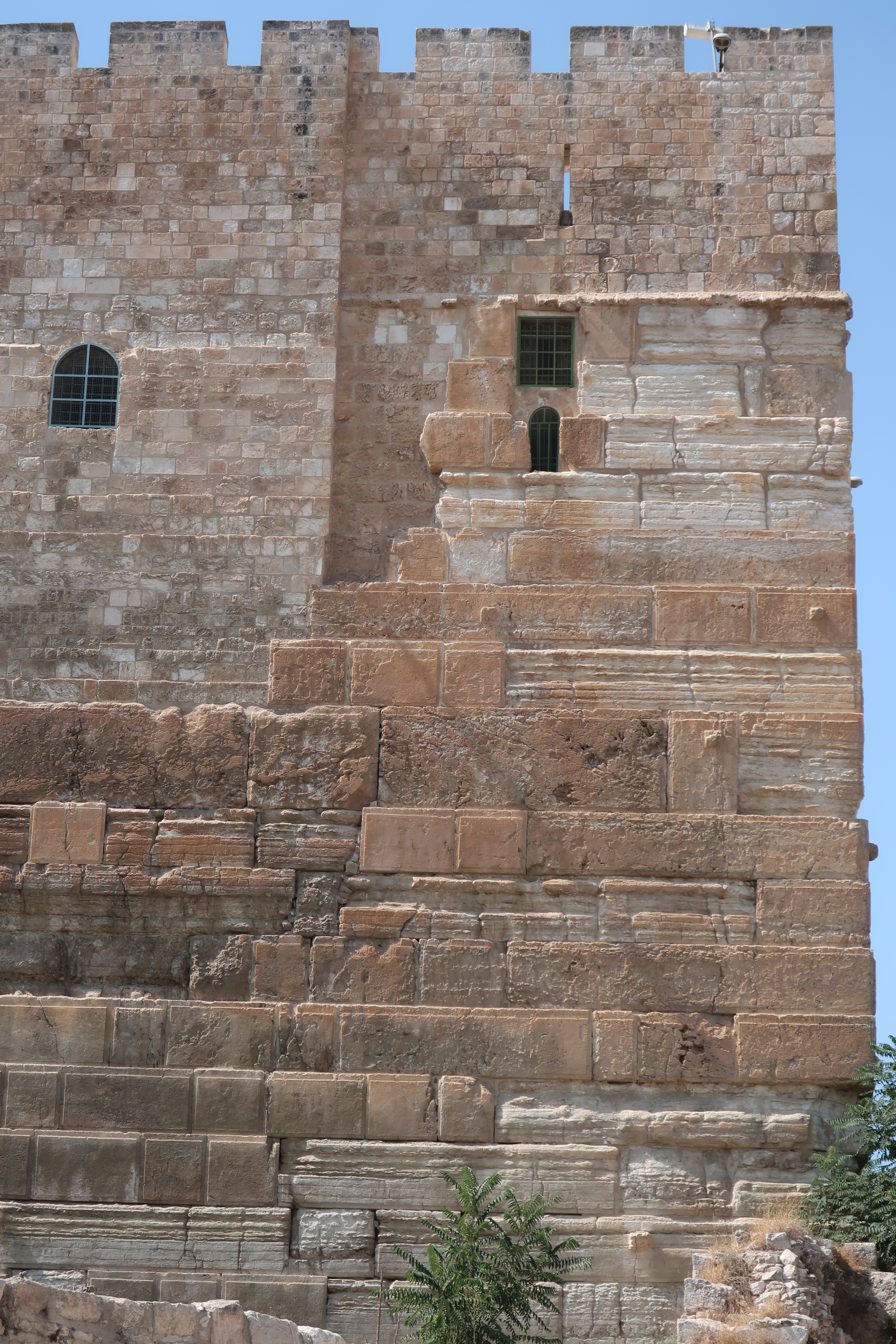
Courses of stone seen on southeastern corner of wall

In the early 21st century, a new bulge was noticed in the Southern Wall, threatening the structural integrity of the masonry. Unauthorized underground construction of the el-Marwani Mosque was cited as the cause. In a compromise between Israel, the Palestinian Authority and the Muslim Waqf that manages the property, it was decided that Jordan would manage the repairs. The Jordanian repair, visible as a bright, white patch in the photo above, has been criticized as "unsightly", an "eyesore", and a "terrible job" because it is out of keeping with the common practices of historical restoration in being of a lighter color and smoother surface than the original stone.

== Points of interest ==
A number of points of interest are situated along the wall, within the Temple Mount and outside, including;

=== Outside of the Wall ===
1. the Ophel - the saddle between the Temple Mount and the City of David
2. the Southern Steps: a large monumental flight of stairs on the southern side of the Temple Mount
3. Remains of Fatimid period fortifications
4. Umayyad-period qasr-type residential and administrative structures
5. the Huldah Gates (eastern and western)

=== Inside the Wall ===
From west to east:

1. the al-Fakhariyya Minaret.
2. the White Mosque (the Women's Mosque), today the al-Aqsa Library.
3. the al-Aqsa Mosque (al-Qibli Mosque).
4. the Musalla of Omar (Mosque of Omar): a musalla in the east wing of the al-Qibli Mosque.
5. the Miḥrāb Dāwūd: a miḥrāb in the wall. (The name was also applied to the main tower of the city's citadel.)

== Gallery ==
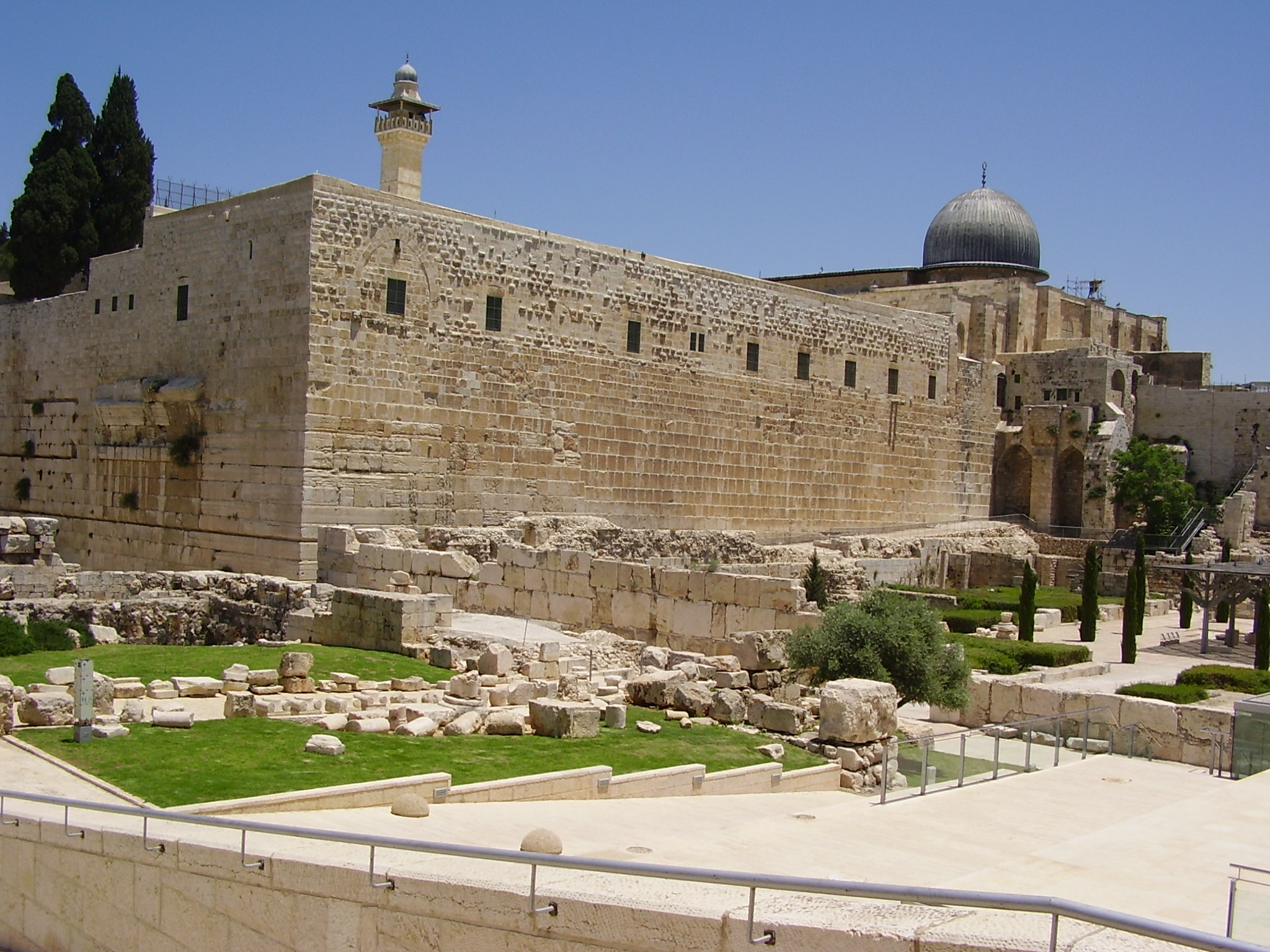
Southwestern corner of the Southern wall showing pillars of Fatimid fortification

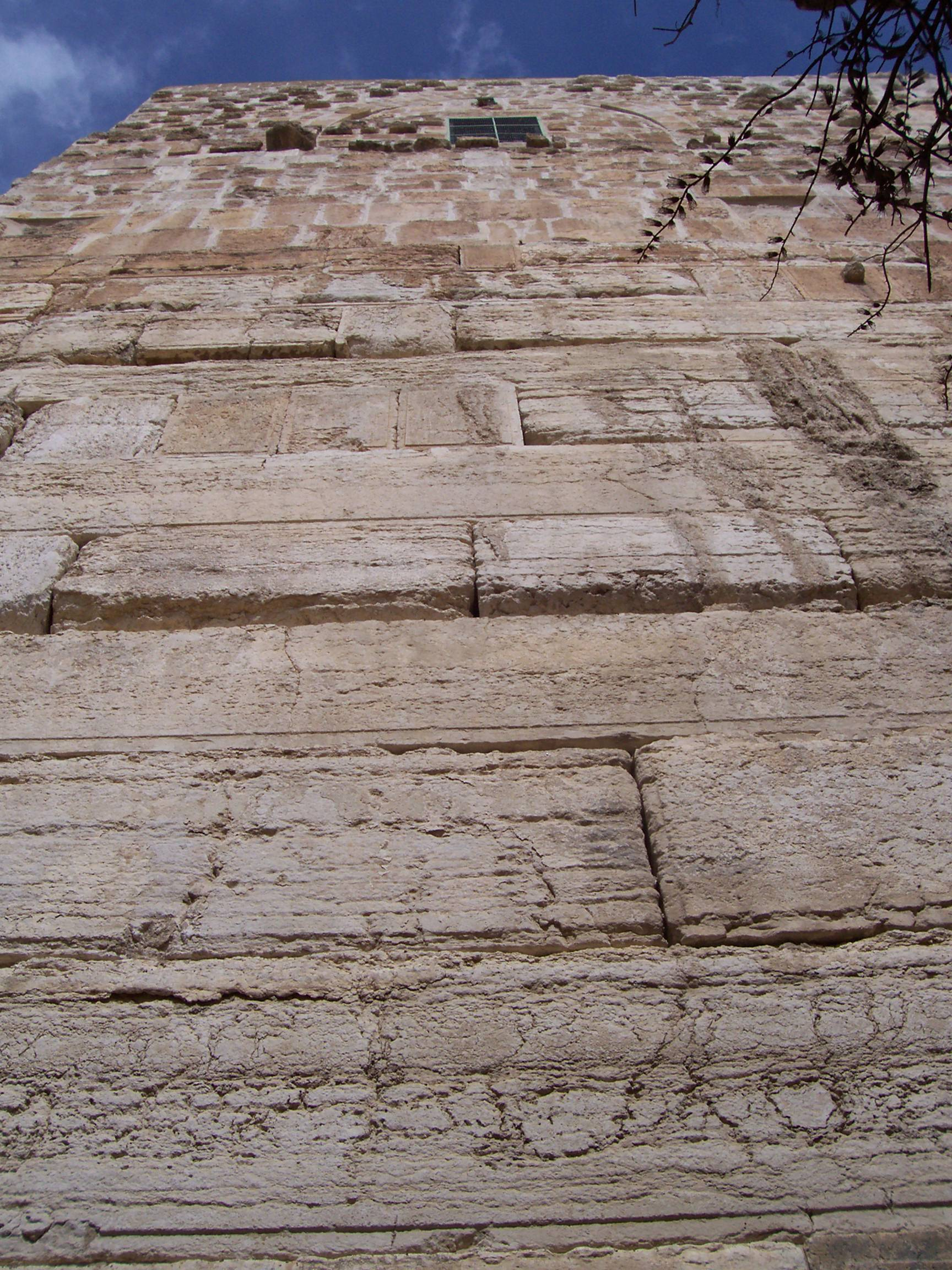
Close-up view of Southern Wall, near the western edge, showing the carved margins and raised bosses on the ashlars

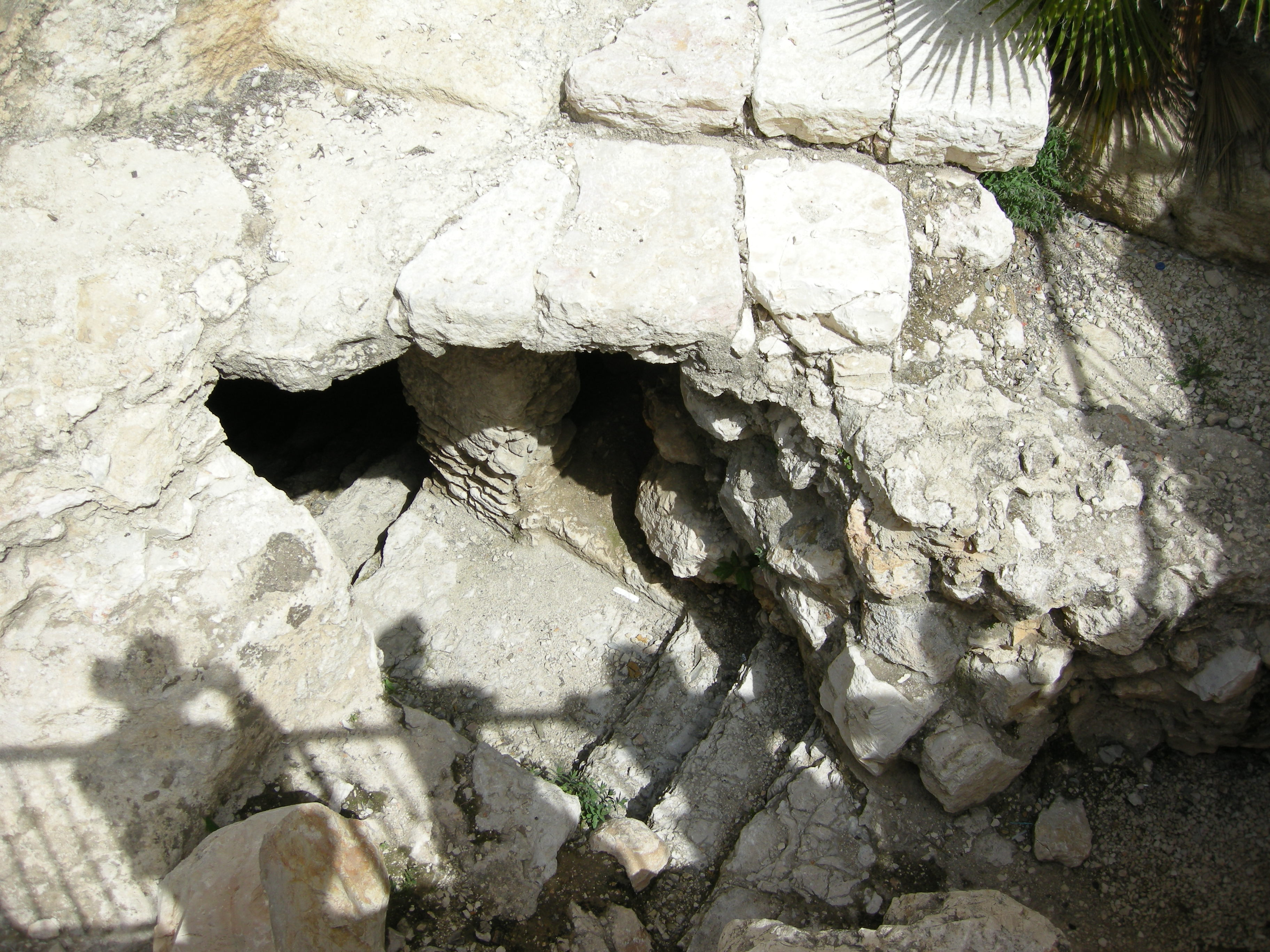
Mikveh unearthed during excavations

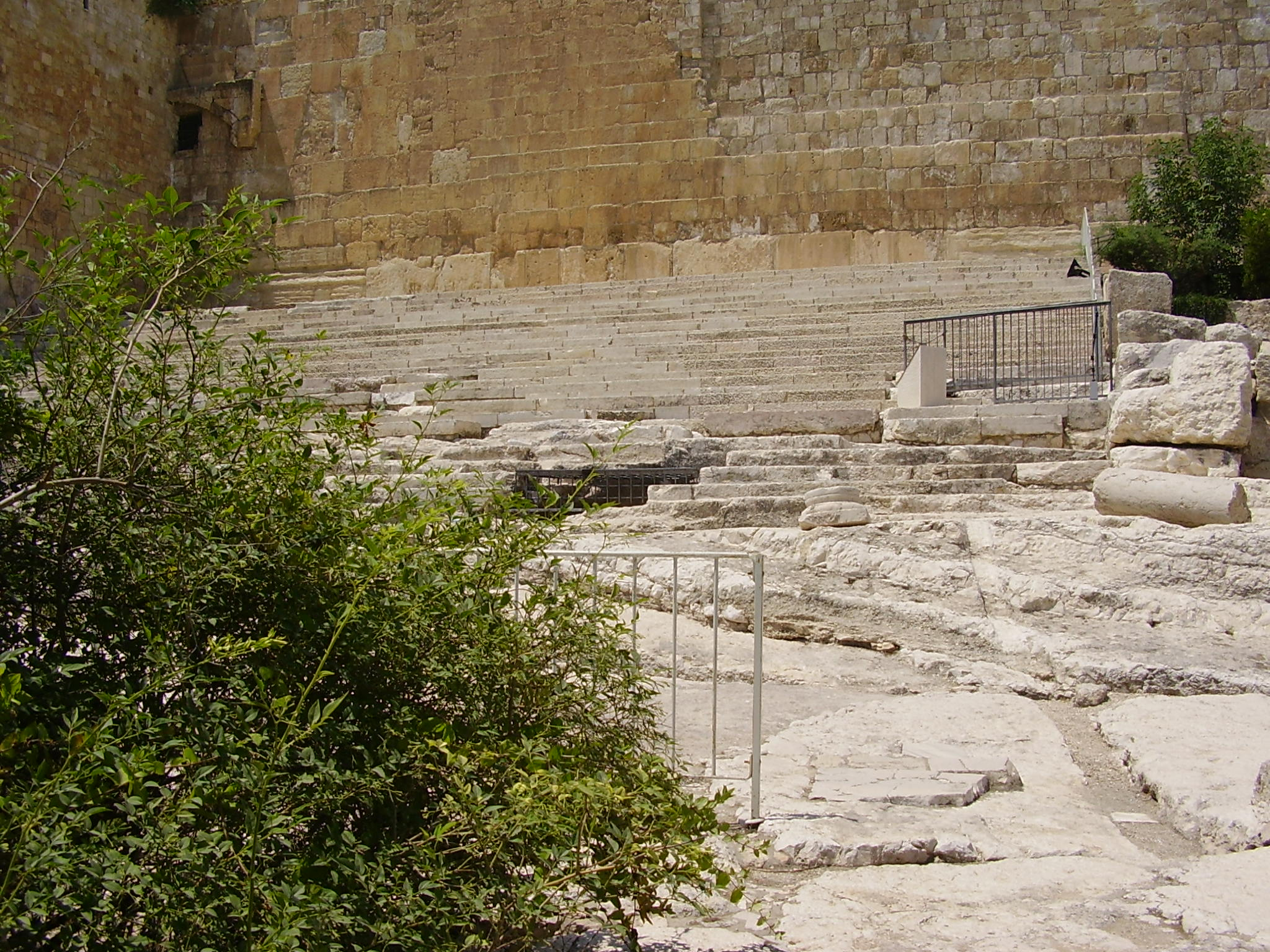
Pilgrim steps as they approach the Double Huldah Gate

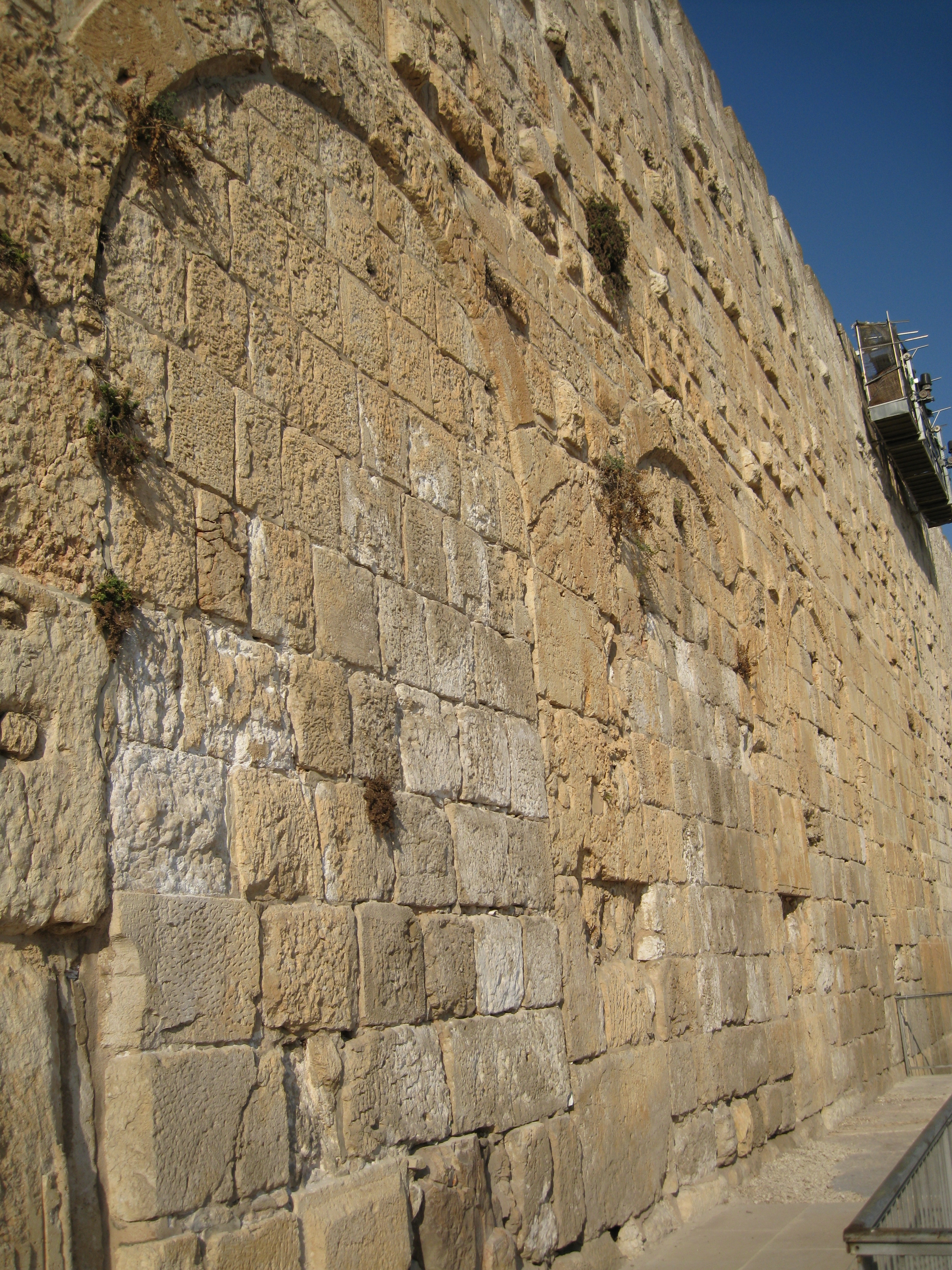
Triple Huldah Gates

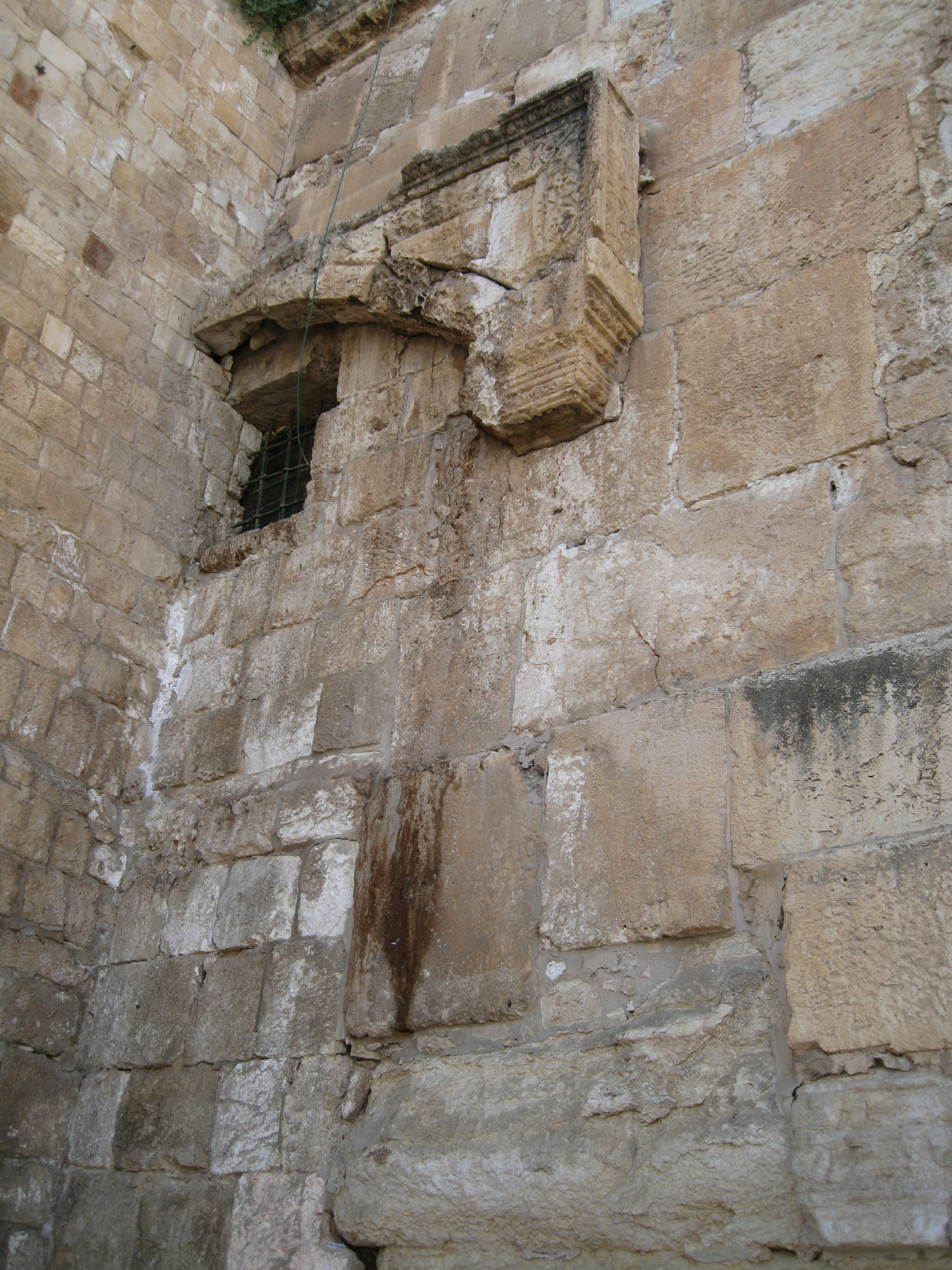
Visible portion of Double Gate

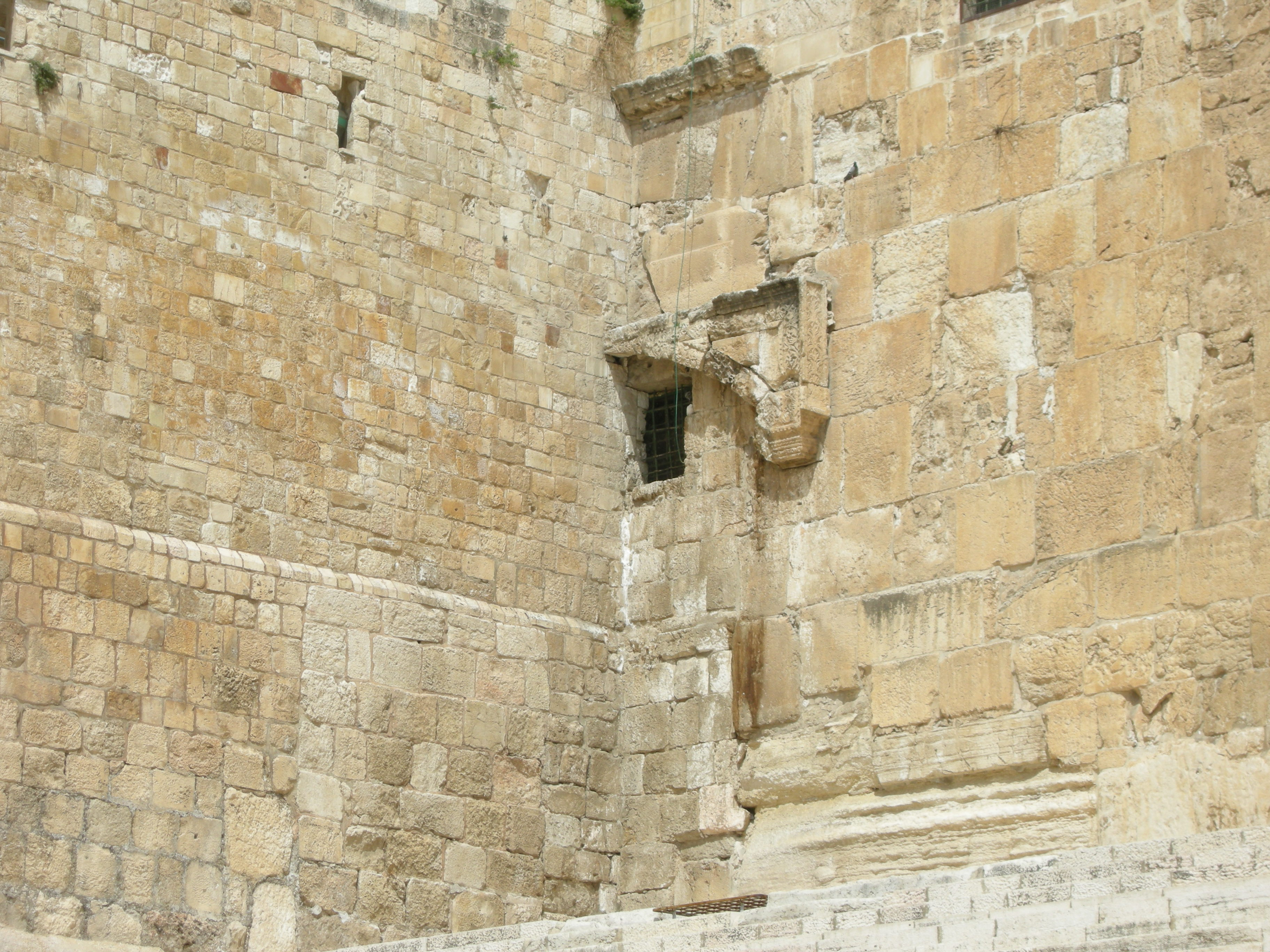
Double Gate

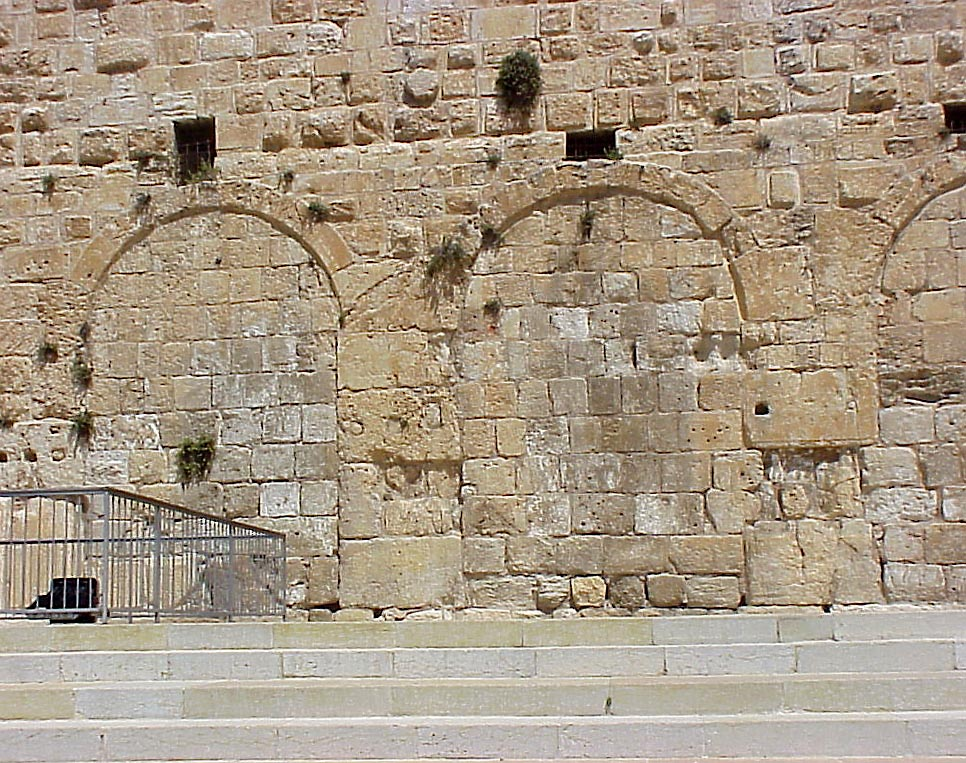
Triple Gate

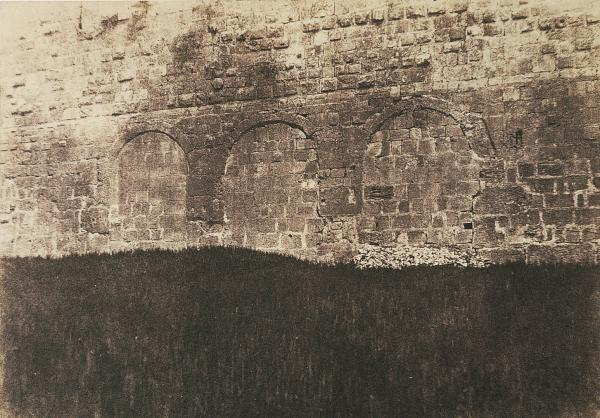
Triple Gate in 1855 photo

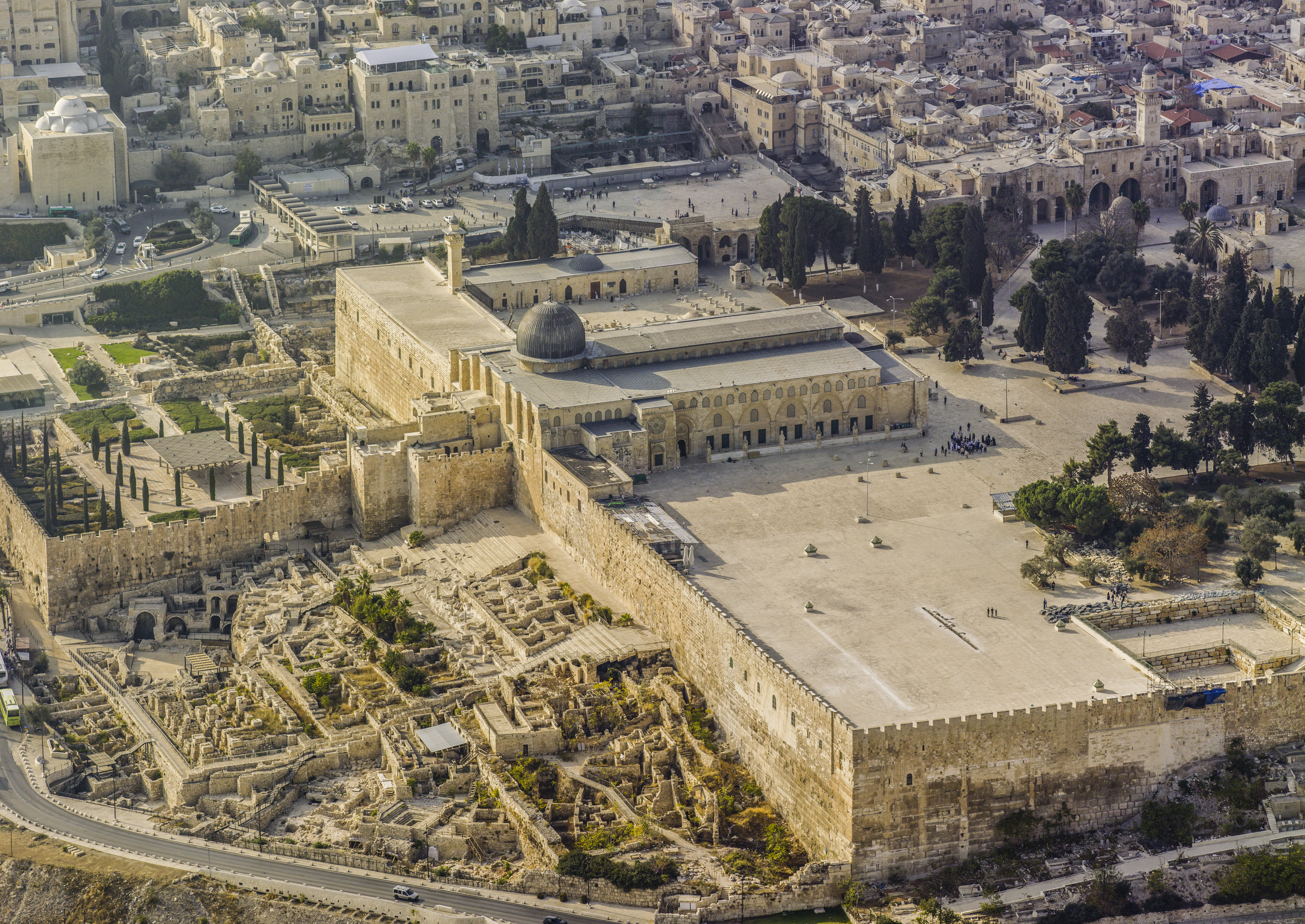
Aerial photo of Southern Wall (2013)

== See also ==
- Archaeology of Israel
- Robinson's Arch
- Acra (fortress)
- Monastery of the Virgins, Byzantine, in the Ophel area
- Walls of Jerusalem
- Western Wall
