= The Double Gate =

Gate of the Old City of Jerusalem

Double Gate
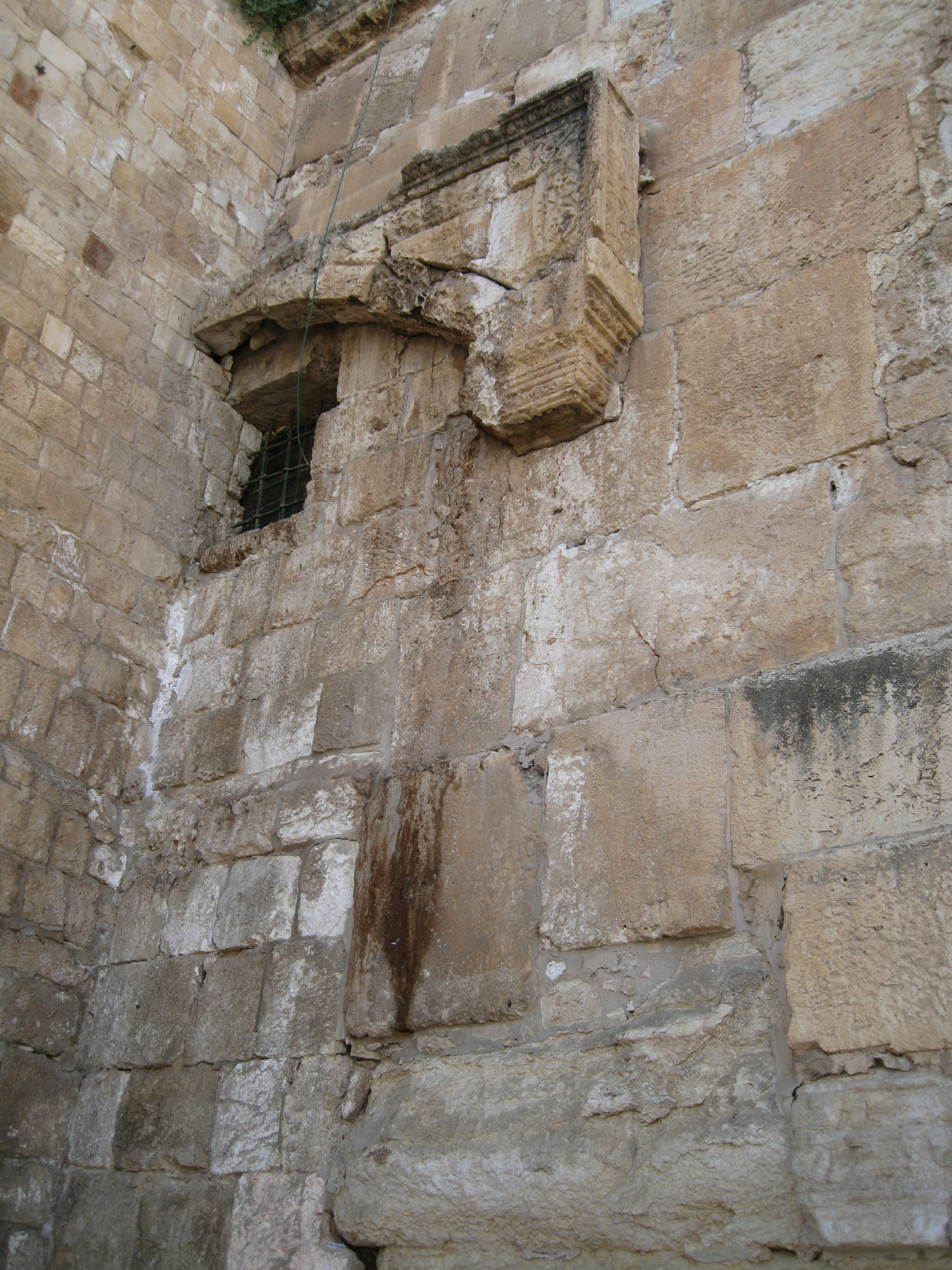
- The two adjacent Double Gates in 2008
- Interactive map of Double Gate
- Type: two adjacent gates
- Location: Southern side of the wall of Al-Aqsa Mosque

Site notes
- Length: 82 m (269 ft)
- Width: 13 m (43 ft)

The Double Gate (Hebrew: השער הכפול, Arabic: الباب المزدوج), also known as the Prophet's Gate (Hebrew: שער הנביא, Arabic: باب النبي), is a pair of adjacent gates, located on the southern side of the wall of the Al-Aqsa Mosque just under the pulpit of the Imam. The gates lead to the courtyards of the mosque through a double door, a corridor 82 m long and about 13 m wide, called the "Old Al-Aqsa". It ends with the staircase of its exit in front of the tribal chapel, 80 meters from the triple door. The door may trace to the Byzantines. The Double Gate and the Triple Gate are both part of the Huldah Gate in the Southern Wall of the Temple Mount.

The decorations of the magnificent top of the door resemble the decorations of the Door of Mercy (Umayyad construction). The presence of stones inscribed in Latin does not indicate Roman stonemasonry, but since the discovery that the stones were arranged upside down, indicating either ignorance or disrespect to the Greco-Roman culture and civilization. (The inscription is found on the front of the door from the outside).

The door was used as an entrance from the Umayyad palaces that were located south of the blessed Al-Aqsa Mosque to the mosque's courtyards through a long corridor known today as the Old Al-Aqsa. It served as the mosque's al-Khataniyya Library that was established in the remains of the Fatimid-era fortification tower, today entered through the western portal of the twin gate.

== Names ==
One of its names is the "Door of the Prophet", where it is believed that the Prophet Muhammad entered on the journey of Isra' and Mi'raj, and Omar entered the courtyards of the mosque while he was destroyed.

== See also ==
- Huldah Gates
- Gates of the Temple Mount
