= Mazari, SBS Nagar =

Mazari
- Village
- Location in Punjab, India Mazari (India)
- Coordinates: 31.1299214°N 76.2301528°E
- Country: India
- State: Punjab
- District: Shaheed Bhagat Singh Nagar

Government
  - Type: Panchayat raj
  - Body: Gram panchayat
- Elevation: 355 m (1,165 ft)

Population (2011)
  - Total: 1,508
- Sex ratio 783/725 ♂/♀

Languages
  - Official: Punjabi
- Time zone: UTC+5:30 (IST)
- PIN: 144505
- Telephone code: 01884
- ISO 3166 code: IN-PB
- Post office: Baharwal (B.O)
- Website: nawanshahr.nic.in

Mazari also spelled as Majari is a village in Shaheed Bhagat Singh Nagar district of Punjab State, India. It is located 10 kilometres (6.2 mi) away from Balachaur, 14 kilometres (8.7 mi) from Nawanshahr, 22.7 kilometres (14.1 mi) from district headquarter Shaheed Bhagat Singh Nagar and 82.7 kilometres (51.4 mi) from state capital Chandigarh. The village is administrated by Sarpanch an elected representative of the village.

== Demography ==
As of 2011, Mazari has a total number of 335 houses and population of 1508 of which 783 include are males while 725 are females according to the report published by Census India in 2011. The literacy rate of Mazari is 85.71% lower than the state average of 75.84%. The population of children under the age of 6 years is 136 which is 9.02% of total population of Mazari, and child sex ratio is approximately 679 as compared to Punjab state average of 846.

Most of the people are from Schedule Caste which constitutes 59.68% of total population in Mazari. The town does not have any Schedule Tribe population so far.

As per the report published by Census India in 2011, 473 people were engaged in work activities out of the total population of Mazari which includes 425 males and 48 females. According to census survey report 2011, 99.37% workers describe their work as main work and 0.63% workers are involved in Marginal activity providing livelihood for less than 6 months.

== Education ==
The village has a privet un-aided Punjabi medium, co-ed upper primary with secondary school established in 1954 and also has an privet un-aided Punjabi medium, co-ed primary with upper primary school which was established in 1989. The schools does not provide mid-day meal.

KC Engineering College and Doaba Khalsa Trust Group Of Institutions are the nearest colleges. Industrial Training Institute for women (ITI Nawanshahr) is 12 kilometres (7.5 mi). The village is 64 kilometres (40 mi) away from Chandigarh University, 40 kilometres (25 mi) from Indian Institute of Technology and 60 kilometres (37 mi) away from Lovely Professional University.

List of schools nearby:

- Dashmesh Model School, Kahma
- Govt Primary School, Kahlon
- Govt High School, Garcha

== Transport ==
Nawanshahr train station is the nearest train station however, Garhshankar Junction railway station is 14 kilometres (8.7 mi) away from the village. Sahnewal Airport is the nearest domestic airport which located 72 kilometres (45 mi) away in Ludhiana and the nearest international airport is located in Chandigarh also Sri Guru Ram Dass Jee International Airport is the second nearest airport which is 168 kilometres (104 mi) away in Amritsar.

== See also ==
- List of villages in India
