= Cheshmeh Sabz =

Village in Kerman, Iran

Cheshmeh Sabz چشمه سبز
- Village
- Location within Iran
- Coordinates: 29°27′52″N 56°25′30″E
- Country: Iran
- Province: Kerman
- County: Baft
- Bakhsh: Central
- Rural District: Gughar

Population (2006)
  - Total: 353
- Time zone: UTC+3:30 (IRST)
  - Summer (DST): UTC+4:30 (IRDT)

Cheshmeh Sabz (Persian: چشمه سبز, also Romanized as Cheshmeh-ye Sabz, Chashmeh-e Sabz, and Chashmeh Sabz; also known as Cheshmeh Sabz Gholi, Mazār, and Sabzpūsh) is a village in Gughar Rural District, in the Central District of Baft County, Kerman Province, Iran. At the 2006 census, its population was 353, in 101 families.
