= Mazar, Arzuiyeh =

Mazar مزار
- Village
- Location within Iran
- Coordinates: 28°44′30″N 56°32′06″E
- Country: Iran
- Province: Kerman
- County: Arzuiyeh
- Bakhsh: Central
- Rural District: Dehsard

Population (2006)
  - Total: 131
- Time zone: UTC+3:30 (IRST)
  - Summer (DST): UTC+4:30 (IRDT)

Mazar (Persian: مزار, also Romanized as Mazār; also known as Bezād) is a village in Dehsard Rural District, in the Central District of Arzuiyeh County, Kerman Province, Iran. At the 2006 census, its population was 131, in 32 families.
