= Gabriel Mazor =

Israeli archaeologist

- גבריאל מזור
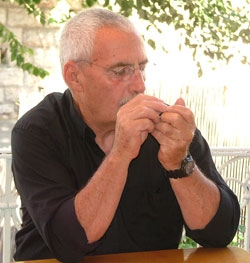
- Born: February 16, 1944 (age 82); Jerusalem
- Citizenship: Israel
- Known for: Director and Senior Researcher of Bet She'an Archaeological Project
- Scientific career
- Fields: Archaeology
- Institutions: Israel Antiquities Authority

Gabriel (Gaby) Mazor (Hebrew: גבריאל מזור; born February 16, 1944) is an Israeli archaeologist working for the Israel Antiquities Authority. Mazor is the director and senior researcher of the Bet She'an Archaeological Project. He is the co-author of "NYSA-Scythopolis: The Caesareum and the Odeum" and has taught in Macalester College and the University of Rochester as a visiting professor. Mazor is also a project consultant on the Horbat ‘Omrit (in the northern Galilee) project.

Mazor obtained his Ph.D. in Classical Archaeology from Bar-Ilan University in 2004. He is a father of two and resides in Jerusalem.

== Research ==
Nysa-Scythopolis, a Greco-Roman polis of the Decapolis, originated during the Hellenistic period, while its remarkable historical chapters ended at 749 CE in a destructive earthquake. Its vast excavations (1986–2000) and the subsequent research conducted by Mazor, the expedition director, focused mainly on the city's civic center and its monumental public buildings. Mazor's research was naturally devoted to the history of the Greco-Roman polei in the region during the Hellenistic, Roman and Byzantine periods. His research is focused on the classical architecture of the various monuments revealed during the excavations, such as city-gates, colonnaded streets, theaters and odea, municipal and state fora, their basilica and temples, all integrated within the polis urban planning. Mazor's research focused on architectural analysis of monuments and their décor, seeking patterns of traditional origins and influences. The analysis of the Roman period architectural patterns and their political and ideological part in shaping the image of Empire was followed by the research into social religious and economic topics, such as the polis inhabitants' ethnicity, their religious affiliations throughout the polis' history, the origins of its economic prosperity and its administrative status throughout the Hellenistic, Roman and Byzantine periods. These fields of interest were gradually widened to include other Roman polei in the region as well as cultic centers of the region throughout the Roman period.

== Publications ==
=== Books ===
- Mazor G. 2004. Free Standing City-Gates in the Eastern Provinces During the Roman Imperial Period. Ph.D. dissertation Bar-Ilan University
- Mazor G. and Najjar A. 2007 Nysa-Scythopolis: The Caesareum and Odeum-Final Report. Bet She'an 1. IAA Reports 33, Jerusalem.
- Mazor G. and Atrash V.. Nysa Scythopolis: The Theater. Final Report. Bet She'an 2–3. IAA Reports (two volumes) Jerusalem.
- Mazor G. and Najjar A. Nysa Scythopolis: City-Gates and the City' Northern Entrances. Final Report. Bet She'an 4–5 IAA Reports (Two volumes) Jerusalem.
- Mazor G. and Sandhouse D. Nysa Scythopolis: The Hellenistic City. Final Report. Bet She'an 6. IAA Reports Jerusalem.
- Mazor G. and Atrash V. Nysa Scythopolis: The Western and Eastern Thearma. Final Report. Bet She'an 7. IAA Reports Jerusalem (in preparation).
- Mazor G., Atrash V. and Sandhouse D. Nysa Scythopolis: The Agora. Final Report 8. IAA Reports Jerusalem (In preparation).
- Mazor G. 2007. Historical and Archaeological Guide to Bet She'an.

=== Selected scholarly articles ===
- 1987–88. Bet She'an Project. City Center of Ancient Bet She'an (South). ESI 6:10–24
- 1988–89. Bet She'an Project 1988. Department of Antiquities Expedition. ESI 7–8:22–32
- 1990. Le Quartier du theatre. Le Monde de la Bible 66: 22–28
- 1992. City Center (South) and Tel Iztaba Area 1988–89; Excavations of the Antiquity Authority Expedition. ESI 11:33–52
- 1994. Bet She'an during the Hellenistic Period. Qadmoniot 107–108:87–92
- 1994. Scythopolis-Capital of Palestina Secunda. Qadmoniot 107–108:117–137
- 1994. The Gates of Roman Scythopolis and its City Planning. La Ciutat el Mond Roma. Actes XIV Congress International d'Arqueologia Classica pp. 268–271
- 1995. Dionysus and Theosevius "Citizens" of Scythopolis. Michmanim 8:87–103
- 1996. The Bet She'an Excavation Project 1992–1994. ESI 17:7–39
- 1996. A Columbarium Cave at Ras Esh-Shekh 'Anbar, East of Jerusalem. 'Atiqot 21:51–57
- 1999. Public Hygiene and Public Baths in Nysa-Scythopolis. Michmanim 13:59–72
- 2000. A Church at Khirbet el-Masani north of Jerusalem. 'Atiqot 40:17–24
- 2000. Roman Byzantine Bath Houses at Scythopolis. JRA Supplementary Series 37 II:292–302
- 2001. The Gates of Scythopolis and the Northern Entrances to the City during the Roman-Byzantine Period. Settlement, Civilization and Culture. Proceedings of the Conference in Memory of David Alon. Bar Ilan University. pp. 199–224
- 2002. Survey and Excavations of the Caves along the Fault Escarpment Above Horbat Qumran. 'Atiqot 41.1:189–200
- 2003. The Survey of Jerusalem IAA Archaeological Survey of Israel
- 2006. The Northern City Wall of Jerusalem on the Eve of the First Crusade. 'Atiqot 51:49–54
- 2006. A Farm House of Late Iron Age and Second Temple Period at the French Hill, North Jerusalem. Atiqot 54:1–9
- 2007. The Temple at Omrit: A Study in Architectural Iconography. BAR International Series. In print
- 2007. The Architectural Orders of Omrit Temples. BAR International Series in print
- 2007. Bet She'an Scythopolis. The New Encyclopedia of Archaeological Excavations in the Holy Land. Vol. V Jerusalem
- 2007. in print. Nysa-Scythopolis: The Eastern Therma. Second International Conference on Ancient Bath. Varna 22–27 April 1996.
- 2009 Forthcoming. A Magical Amulet from Aelia Capitolina. Atiqot
- 2009 Forthcoming. A Graeco-Egyptian Amulet from Nysa-Scythopolis. Atiqot
- 2009 Forthcoming. An Engraved Carnelian Gem from Nysa-Scythopolis. Atiqot
- 2009. Byzantine Wine Presses in the Negev. In E Ayalon, R. Frankel and A Kloner (eds.) Oil and Wine Presses in Israel from the Hellenistic, Roman and Byzantine Periods. BAR International Series 1972. pp. 399–411
- 2010 Forthcoming. The Temple at Omrit and Rome's Eastern Policy. Festschrift in Honor of A. Kloner Bar Ilan
- 2010. Mazor G and Regev E. (eds) festschrift in honor of S. Dar. Bar Ilan
- 2010 In print. Nysa-Scythopolis: History of Ethnicity and Religion. In R. Kratz (ed.) One God, One Cult, One Nation. Göttingen
- 2010 In print . Urban Architecture of the Eastern Roman Provinces and the Image of Empire. In G. Charlesworth (ed.) Methodological Approaches to the Historical Jesus: The Second Princeton-Prague Symposium on * Jesus Researches, Princeton 2007. Princeton. Eerdamans
- 2010 In print. Imperial Cult in the Decapolis, Nysa-Scythopolis as a Test Case. In A. Killebrew (ed) festschrift in honor of R. Hachlili

== See also ==
- Archaeology of Israel
- Beit She'an
- Classical archaeology
- History of Israel
