= Qaleh Now, Arzuiyeh =

Qaleh Now قلعه نو
- Village
- Location within Iran
- Coordinates: 28°26′05″N 56°10′24″E
- Country: Iran
- Province: Kerman
- County: Arzuiyeh
- Bakhsh: Central
- Rural District: Vakilabad

Population (2006)
  - Total: 833
- Time zone: UTC+3:30 (IRST)
  - Summer (DST): UTC+4:30 (IRDT)

Qaleh Now (Persian: قلعه نو, also Romanized as Qal`eh Now and Qal‘eh-ye Now; also known as Mazār) is a village in Vakilabad Rural District, in the Central District of Arzuiyeh County, Kerman Province, Iran. At the 2006 census, its population was 833, in 192 families.
