= Mazar, South Khorasan =

Mazar مزار
- Village
- Location within Iran
- Coordinates: 32°48′00″N 59°10′12″E
- Country: Iran
- Province: South Khorasan
- County: Birjand
- Bakhsh: Central
- Rural District: Baqeran

Population (2006)
  - Total: 33
- Time zone: UTC+3:30 (IRST)
  - Summer (DST): UTC+4:30 (IRDT)

Mazar (Persian: مزار, also Romanized as Mazār; also known as Kalāt-e Mazār) is a village in Baqeran Rural District, in the Central District of Birjand County, South Khorasan Province, Iran. At the 2006 census, its population was 33, in 9 families.
