= Mazer =

Mazer may refer to:

- Mazer (drinking vessel), a type of cup mostly made from the 13th to the 16th centuries
- Mazer Rackham, a fictional character from Orson Scott Card's Ender's Game series
- Bill Mazer, a famous American sportscaster
- Norma Fox Mazer, author of books for children and young adults
- Johan Mazer, Swedish musician
- Mazer (video game), a 1996 video game by American Laser Games
- Mazer Zaouia, a village in El Oued Province, Algeria

== See also ==
- Maser, a device that emits microwaves by stimulated emission, similar to a laser but using a longer wavelength.
- Mazar (disambiguation)
- Mazor (disambiguation)
- Mazur (disambiguation)
