= Huldah Gates =

Gate of the Old City of Jerusalem

Hulda Gate
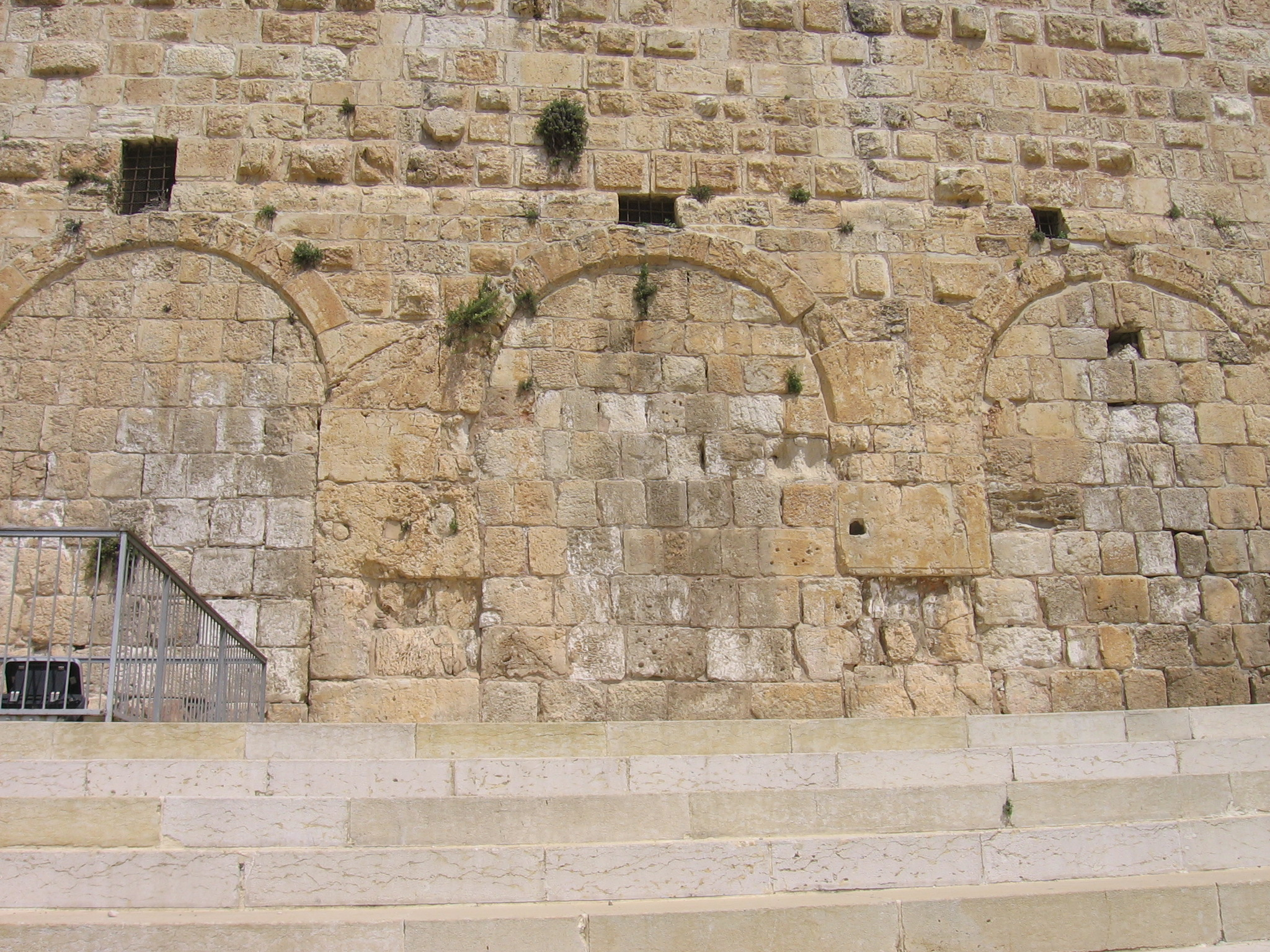
- The eastern set of Hulda Gates (Herodian and later) as it stands today.

- Location within Old City of Jerusalem

General information
- Location: Jerusalem
- Coordinates: 31°46′33.4″N 35°14′11.8″E

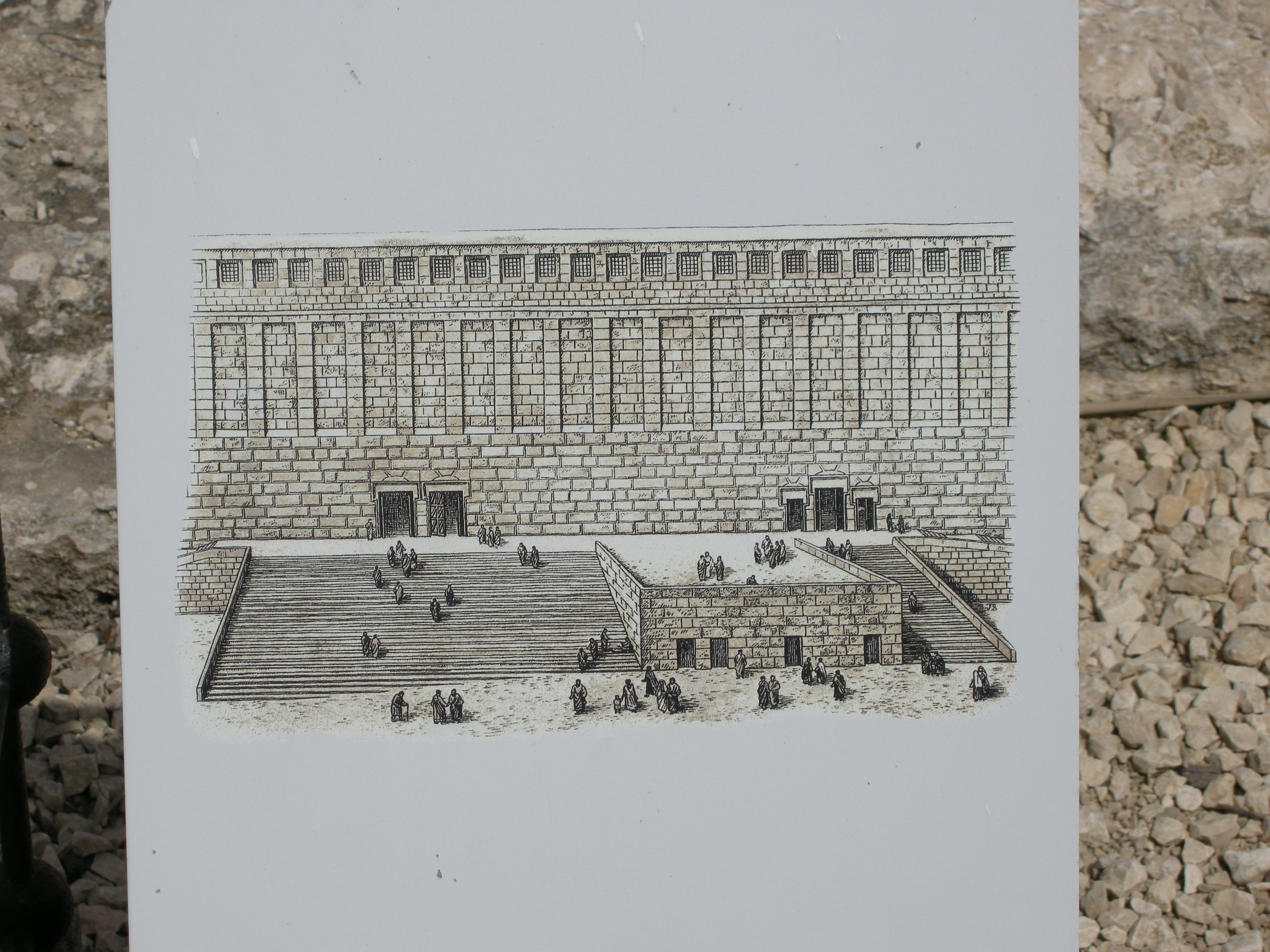
Reconstruction of the Herodian Hulda Gates.

The Huldah Gates (Hebrew: שערי חולדה, Sha'arei Hulda) were one of the Gates of the Old City of Jerusalem leading into the Jerusalem Temple compound in the Hasmonean period and were named as such in the Mishnah. The term is currently being used for the remains of two later sets of gates, the Triple Gate and the Double Gate, known together as the Huldah Gates, built as part of the much extended Herodian Temple Mount, situated in Jerusalem's Old City. Both sets of gates were set into the Southern Wall of the Temple compound and gave access to the Temple Mount esplanade by means of underground vaulted ramps. Both were walled up in the Middle Ages.

The western set is a double-arched gate (the Double Gate), and the eastern is a triple-arched gate (the Triple Gate). There still are a few Herodian architectural elements visible outside and inside the gates, while most everything else of what we see today is later, Muslim-period work.

== Etymology ==
The name "Huldah gates" is taken from the description of the Temple Mount in the Mishnah (Tractate of Midot 1:3).

Two possible etymologies are given for the name: "Huldah" means "mole" or "mouse" in Hebrew, and the tunnels leading up from these gates called to mind the holes or tunnels used by these animals. Alternatively, in a possible folk etymology, the First Temple prophetess Huldah was said to have held court in this area and, indeed, her tomb was placed here by some as well.

== Identification ==
Accepted opinion amongst scholars is that the Mishna's description (see under Etymology) refers to the sanctified area of the Temple Mount in the Hasmonean period. Therefore, calling the gates found in the current southern wall "Huldah" would be an anachronism, as the base of that wall is part of Herod's post-Hasmonean extension of the Temple Mount.

== Archaeology ==
The 19th century excavations of the area by Charles Warren discovered an erratic series of passageways under the triple gate, some leading below the wall and beyond the Mount's southern edge. The purpose and age of these passages are unknown, and more recent archaeologists have not been allowed to investigate due to the political volatility of the site. The passageways from both gates are now used by the waqf as mosques.

== Description ==
Both the Double and Triple Gates of the Herodian time allowed access to the Temple Mount esplanade via a vestibule followed by underground vaulted ramps. They have both been blocked since the Middle Ages, and the underground access routes have been partially or fully reconstructed during the Umayyad and later reconstructions and repair work.

=== Double Gate ===
The Double Gate was blocked by the construction of a medieval tower in front of it, probably during Fatimid era. Today a small library is established within the remains of this medieval-era fortification tower. Of what we see today, which is part of the right (eastern) gate, the lintel and the relieving arch above it are Herodian, while the intricately carved cornice is Umayyad. Only the eastern portal of the twin, now blocked, gate is partially visible today.

Inside the Double Gate there is a vestibule with large columns (at least three) supporting two pairs of domes. The central columns and two more flanking the steps are Herodian, and have recently been reinforced with concrete frames. The domes though seem to be from an early seventh-century (Early Muslim) reconstruction.

When the Al-Aqsa Mosque was built, the old steps were blocked, and the eastern aisle lengthened so that new steps from its end would exit north of the mosque, so essentially the exit on the Temple Mount moved eastwards somewhat. The mosque's al-Khataniyya Library was also established in the remains of the Fatimid-era fortification tower, today entered through the western portal of the twin gate.

=== Triple Gate ===
The Triple Gate was blocked in the 11th century. The western jamb is Herodian, while the rest of what we see today is Umayyad.

Inside the Triple Gate, in Herodian times there must have been a passageway identical to the one inside the Double Gate. Its remains now connect to the so-called "Al-Marwani Mosque (Solomon's Stables)", initially a pillared Herodian substructure of his enlarged Temple esplanade, with some Herodian elements still visible, but repeatedly repaired and rebuilt over the centuries and used since 1996 as a mosque.

The interior of the Triple Gate is similar to that of the Double Gate, though the longer aisle is to the west, and its third aisle, on the east, forms the western boundary of the vaulted area known as Al-Marwani Mosque (Solomon's Stables).

== Gallery ==
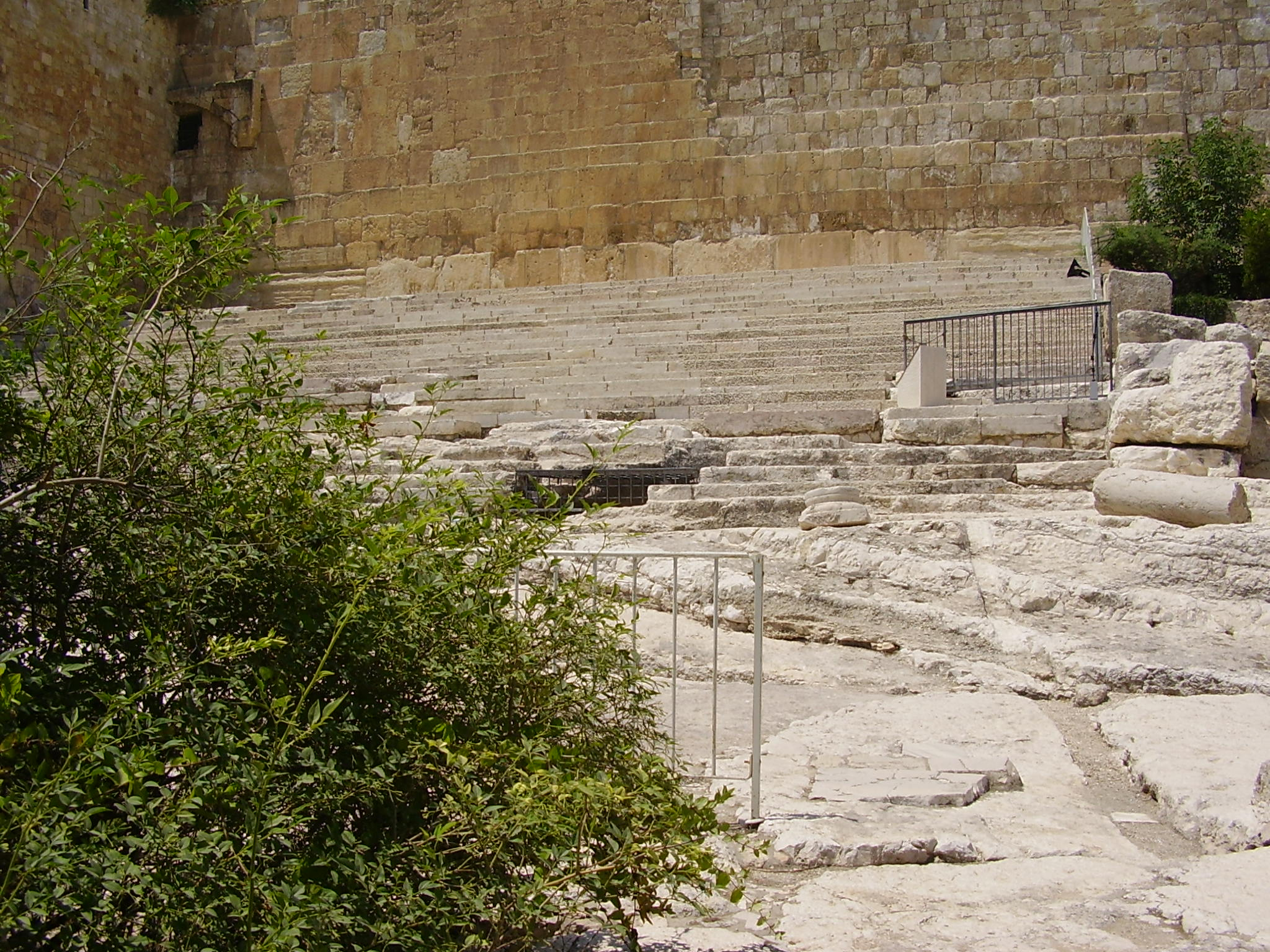
Staircase leading to the Double Gate

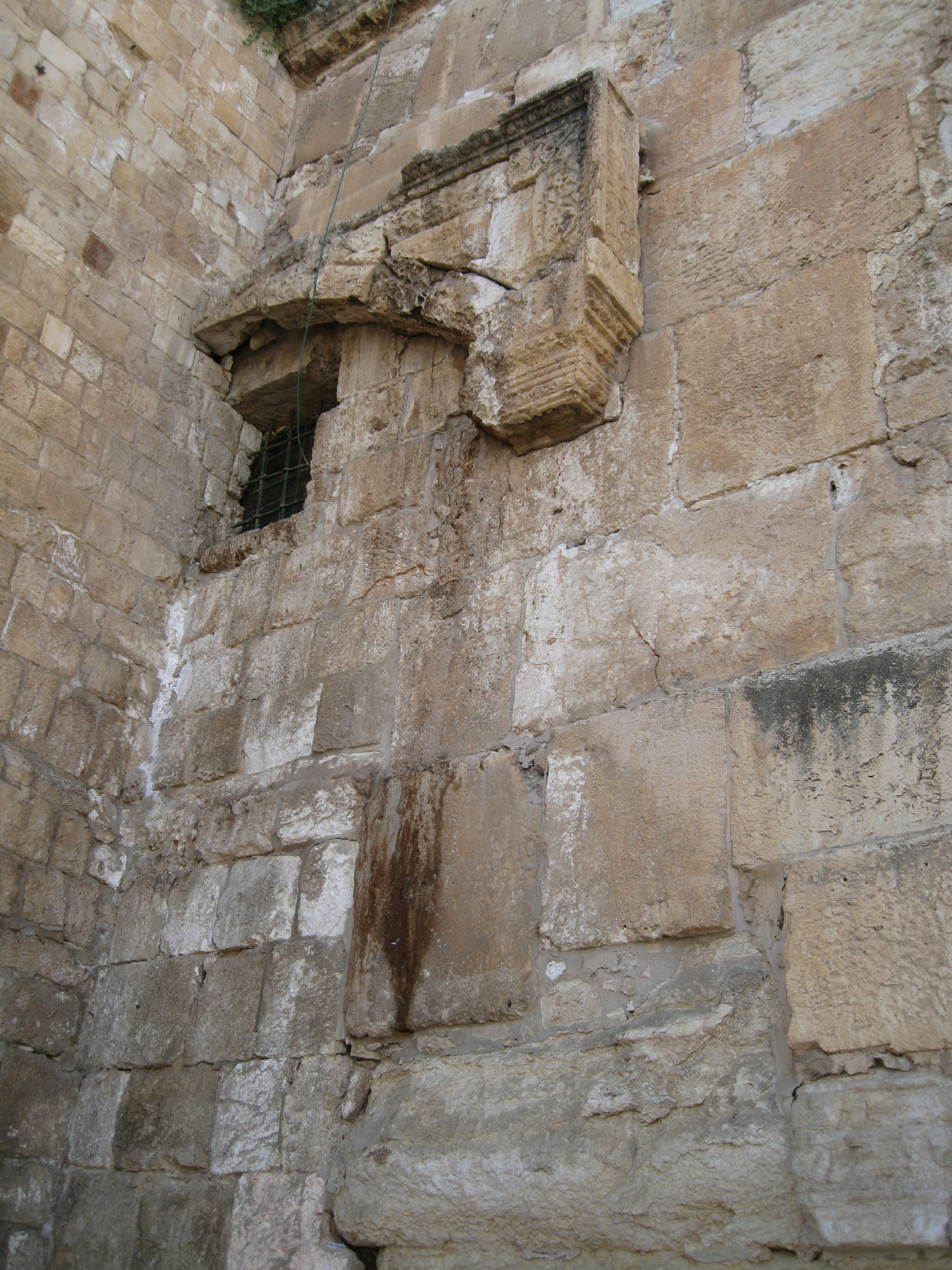
Visible part of the Double Gate (a medieval tower is hiding the left, western part)

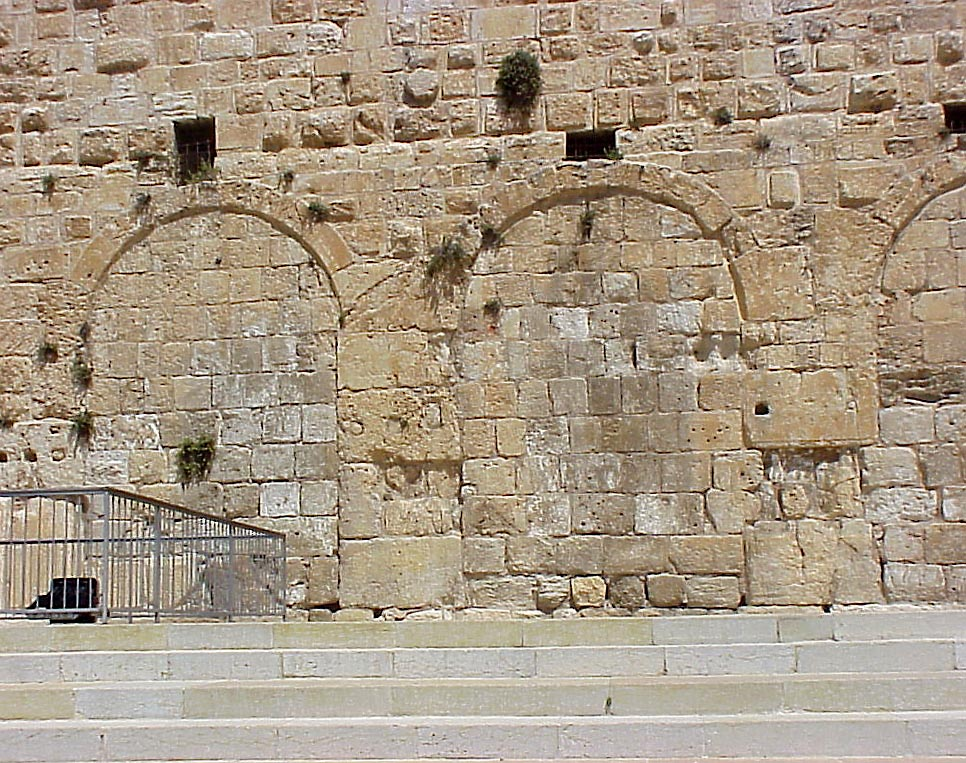
The walled-up Triple Gate

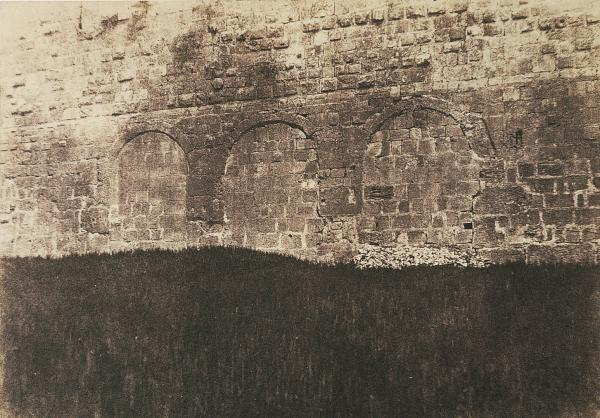
Triple Gate in 1855 photo

== See also ==
- Gates of the Temple Mount
