= Benjamin Mazar =

Israeli historian and biblical archaeologist (1906-1995)

- בנימין מזר
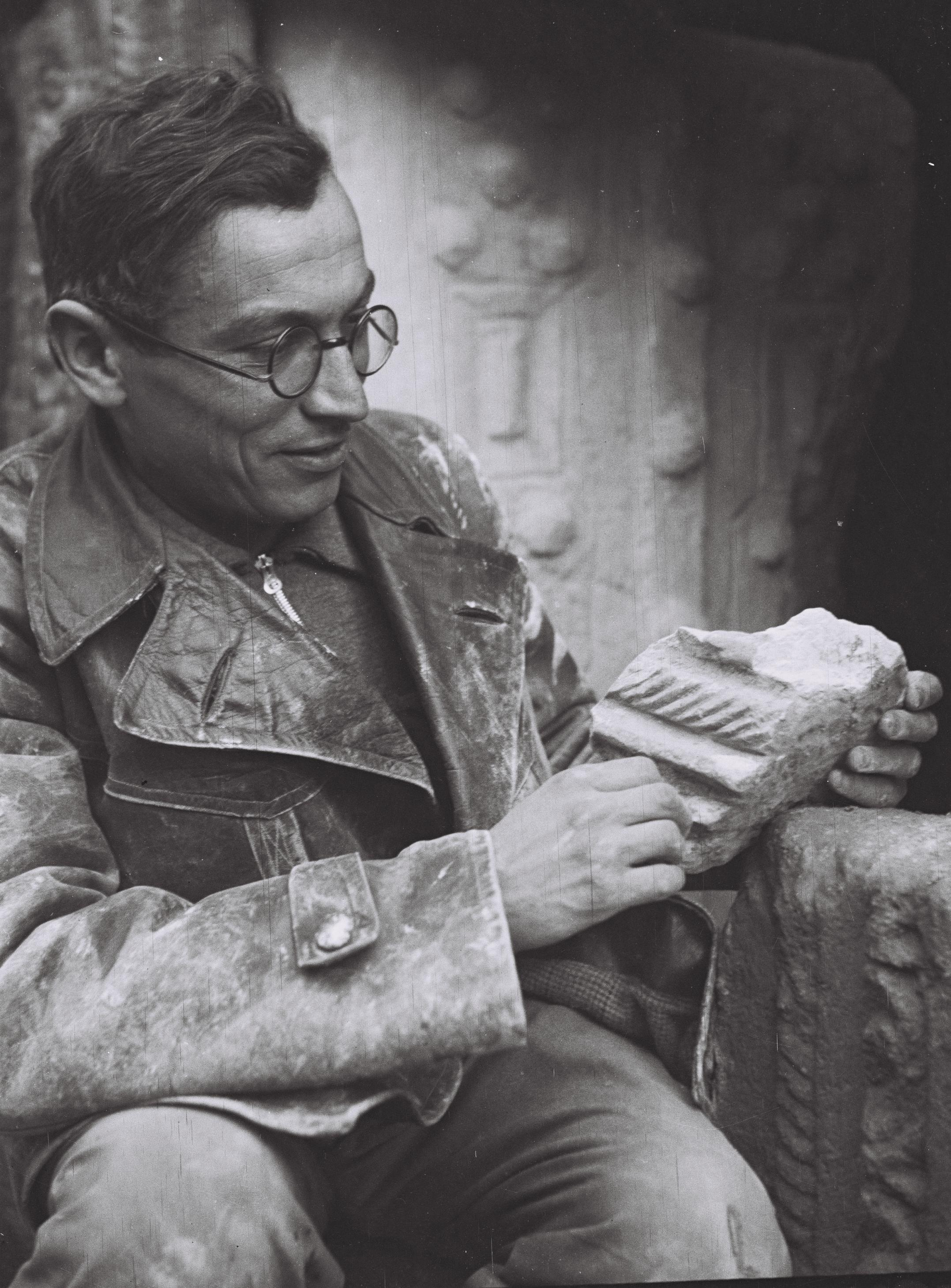
- Benjamin Mazar in 1936, at Bet Shearim
- Born: Binyamin Zeev Maisler; June 28, 1906; Ciechanowiec, Grodno Governorate, Russian Empire
- Died: September 9, 1995 (aged 89)
- Education: Berlin University; Giessen University
- Occupation: Biblical archaeologist
- Known for: Developed the field of historical geography of Israel; President of the Hebrew University of Jerusalem; Founded the Hebrew University's campus at Givat Ram and Hadassah Medical School and Hospital at Ein Karem
- Family: Eilat Mazar (grandchild), Amihai Mazar (nephew), Yitzhak Ben Zvi (brother-in-law)
- Awards: Israel Prize; Yakir Yerushalayim; Harvey Prize

Benjamin Mazar (Hebrew: בנימין מזר; born Binyamin Zeev Maisler, June 28, 1906 – September 9, 1995) was a pioneering Israeli historian, recognized as the "dean" of biblical archaeologists. He shared the national passion for the archaeology of Israel that also attracts considerable international interest due to the region's biblical links. He is known for his excavations at the most significant biblical site in Israel: south and south west of the Temple Mount in Jerusalem. In 1932 he conducted the first archaeological excavation under Jewish auspices in Israel at Beit She'arim (the largest catacombs ever found in Israel) and in 1948 was the first archaeologist to receive a permit granted by the new State of Israel (Tell Qasile, 1948). Mazar was trained as an Assyriologist and was an expert on biblical history, authoring more than 100 publications on the subject. He developed the field of historical geography of Israel. For decades he served as the chairman of the Israel Exploration Society and of the Archaeological Council of Israel (which he founded as the authority responsible for all archaeological excavations and surveys in Israel). Between 1951 and 1977, Mazar served as Professor of Biblical History and Archaeology at the Hebrew University of Jerusalem. In 1952 he became Rector of the university and later its president for eight years commencing in 1953.

He founded the Hebrew University's new campus at Givat Ram and Hadassah Medical School and Hospital at Ein Karem and led the academic development of the university into one of the leading Universities of the World (see Academic Ranking of World Universities). He was regarded by his students as an inspiring teacher and academic leader and many of these students are now considered leading historians and archaeologists in Israel today.

== Biography ==
Mazar was born in Ciechanowiec, in the Grodno Governorate of the Russian Empire (now Poland). He was educated at Berlin University and Giessen University in Germany. At the age of 23, he immigrated to Mandatory Palestine and in 1943 joined the faculty of the Hebrew University of Jerusalem, whose original campus at Mount Scopus was an enclave in the Jordanian sector of Jerusalem following the 1948 Arab–Israeli War. In 1952 he became Rector of the university and later its president for eight years from 1953 to 1961, following Selig Brodetsky and succeeded by Giulio Racah.

== Archaeological career ==
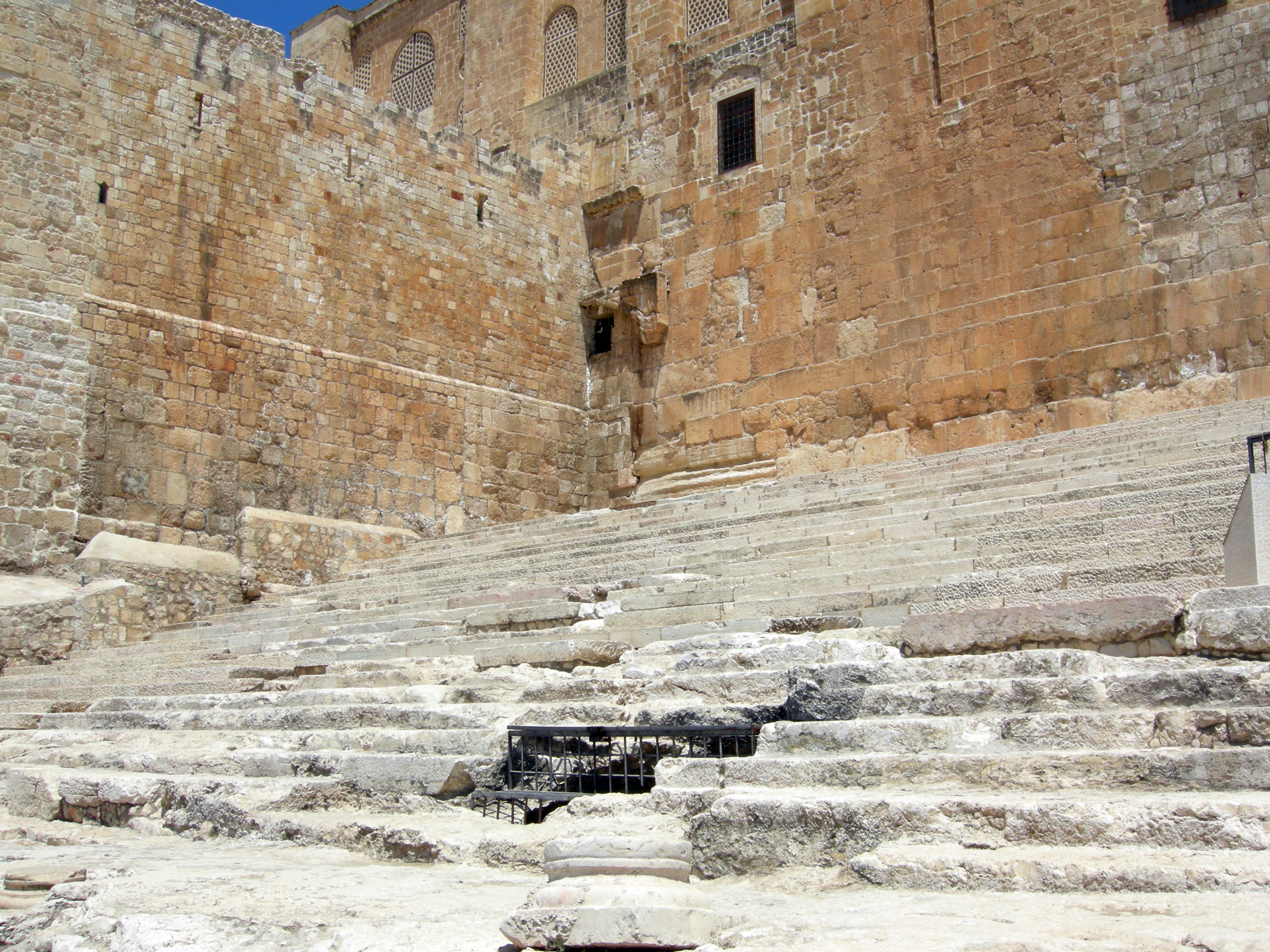
Remnants of the 1st century Stairs of Ascent, discovered by archaeologist Benjamin Mazar, to the entrance of the Temple courtyard. Pilgrims coming to offer sacrifices at the Temple would have entered and exited by this stairway.

In 1936 Mazar started the excavations of Beth Shearim, the first archaeological excavation organized by a Jewish institution, and uncovered there the large Jewish catacombs dated to the 2nd-4th centuries CE, known as the burial place of the Jewish leader Rabbi Yehudah Hanasi, the compiler of the Mishnah. In 1948 he was the first archaeologist to receive a permit to dig in the new State of Israel, and explored the Philistine town of Tell Qasile in northern Tel Aviv (two other excavations had already taken place in the new state without permits). He later conducted excavations at Ein Gedi and between 1968 and 1977 directed the excavations south and south-west of the Temple Mount in Jerusalem, including an area he described as the Ophel, uncovering extensive remains from the Iron Age through the Second Temple period and to Jerusalem's Islamic period.

=== Tomb of Himyarites ===
Tomb of Himyarite, in Greek uncials

In 1937, Benjamin Mazar revealed at Beit She'arim a system of tombs belonging to the Jews of Ḥimyar (now southern Yemen) dating back to the 3rd century CE. The strength of ties between Yemenite Jewry and the Land of Israel can be learnt, of course, by the system of tombs at Beit She'arim dating back to the 3rd century. It is of great significance that Jews from Ḥimyar were being buried in what was then considered a prestigious place, near the tombs of the Sanhedrin. Those who had the financial means brought their dead to be buried in the Land of Israel, as it was considered an outstanding virtue for Jews not to be buried in foreign lands, but rather in the land of their forefathers. It is speculated that the Ḥimyarites, during their lifetime, were known and respected in the eyes of those who dwelt in the Land of Israel, seeing that one of them, whose name was Menaḥem, was coined the epithet qyl ḥmyr [prince of Ḥimyar], in the eight-character Ḥimyari ligature, while in the Greek inscription he was called Menae presbyteros (Menaḥem, the community's elder). The name of a woman in Greek letters, in its genitive form, Ενλογιαζ, was also engraved there, meaning either ‘virtue’, ‘blessing’, or ‘gratis’.

== Mazar family ==
Benjamin Mazar's son Ory Mazar, grandchildren Eilat Mazar and Dan Mazar and nephew Amihai Mazar all played an important role in the study and dissemination of Israeli archaeology and historical knowledge. Eilat Mazar was a frequent spokesperson for concerns regarding the archaeology of the Temple Mount in Jerusalem while Amihai Mazar was the recipient of the 2009 Israel Prize for Archaeology. Benjamin Mazar is the brother-in-law of Israel's second and only three-term President, Yitzhak Ben Zvi.

== Awards ==
- In 1968, Mazar was awarded the Israel Prize, for Jewish studies.
- Also in 1968, he received the Yakir Yerushalayim (Worthy Citizen of Jerusalem) award.
- In 1986, he was awarded the Harvey Prize by the Technion (Israel Institute of Technology).

== See also ==
- Archaeology of Israel
- Biblical archaeology
- List of Israel Prize recipients
- Monastery of the Virgins
