= De Coster =

De Coster or Decoster is a Dutch occupational surname, most common in Flanders. Coster is an archaic spelling of modern Dutch "koster" (parish clerk). People with this surname include:

- Adam de Coster (c. 1586–1643), Flemish Baroque painter
- Charles De Coster (1827–1879), Belgian novelist best known for his Legend of Thyl Ulenspiegel
- Dominicus de Coster (c. 1560–1612), Flemish artist, printer and copperplate engraver
- Jean-Baptiste De Coster (guide) (1760–1826), an unwilling Flemish guide for Napoleon at Waterloo
- Jean-Baptiste De Coster (Jesuit) (1896–1968), a Belgian priest who sheltered Jews from the Holocaust
- Jonathan Decoster (born 1987), American football player
- Koen Decoster, Belgian historian, philosopher and translator
- Maggy de Coster (born 1966), French writer
- Maurice De Coster (1890–?), Belgian football player
- Roger De Coster (born 1944), Belgian motocross racer and team manager
- Saskia De Coster (born 1976), Belgian writer

== See also ==
- Coster (disambiguation)
- Koster (disambiguation)
