= Koster (surname) =

Koster is the Dutch word for sexton or verger (Küster in German), derived from the Latin custos.

Koster is a common surname in the Netherlands, ranking 45th in 2007 (15,898 people). People with the surname "Koster" or "De Koster" include:

- I Wayan Koster (born 1962) Indonesian politician, current governor of Bali
- Adam de Koster (1586–1643), Flemish painter
- Adrie Koster (born 1954), Dutch footballer
- Annelise Koster (born 1999), Namibian artistic gymnast
- Anouska Koster (born 1993), Dutch racing cyclist
- Bo Koster (born 1974), American rock musician
- Chava Koster, Dutch rabbi
- Chris Koster (born 1964), American politician from Missouri
- Chris Koster (musician), Canadian singer-songwriter
- Claudia Koster (born 1992), Dutch road cyclist
- Cornelis H. A. Koster (1943–2013), Dutch computer scientist
- Daphne Koster (born 1981), Dutch footballer
- Dominique Koster (born 1977), South African sprinter
- Emma Koster (born 1984), Australian athlete
- Everhardus Koster (1817–1892), Dutch land- and seascape painter
- Fred Koster (1905–1979), American baseball player
- George F. Koster (1927–2012), American physicist
- Hans de Koster (1904–1992), Dutch politician
- Henry Koster (1905–1988), German-born American film director
- Henry Koster (author) (1793–1820), English coffee-grower, explorer, botanist and author
- Irene Koster (1921–2012), Dutch swimmer
- Jan Koster (born 1945), Dutch linguist
- Jans Koster (born 1938), Dutch swimmer
- Jared Koster (born 1991), Canadian football linebacker
- Joëlle Rollo-Koster (born 1960s), French historian
- John Koster (1844–1895), American impresario of the Koster and Bial's Music Hall
- John Koster (born 1951), Washington State politician
- Joséphine Thérèse Koster (1902–1986), botanist
- Julian Koster (born 1972), American musician
- Karen Koster (born 1980), Irish-Dutch television presenter
- Kym Koster (born 1973), Australian rules footballer
- Laure Koster (1902–1999), Luxembourgian swimmer
- Laurens Janszoon Koster (c. 1370–1440), Dutch printer
- Lou Koster (1889–1973), Luxembourgian composer and pianist
- Luis Koster (1942–2021), Uruguayan basketball player
- Martijn Koster (born c. 1970), Dutch software engineer
- Martin Koster (born 1950), Dutch writer
- Maureen Koster (born 1992), Dutch middle-distance runner
- Nick Köster (born 1989), South African rugby union player
- R. M. Koster (born 1934), American author
- Raph Koster (born 1971), American computer entrepreneur
- Samuel W. Koster (1919–2006), American army officer
- Sepp Koster (born 1974), Dutch racing driver

== See also ==
- Coster
- Köster
- Koester
- Koster (disambiguation)
- Kostner
