= Horse Gate =

Ancient biblical gate of Jerusalem

- שער הסוסים
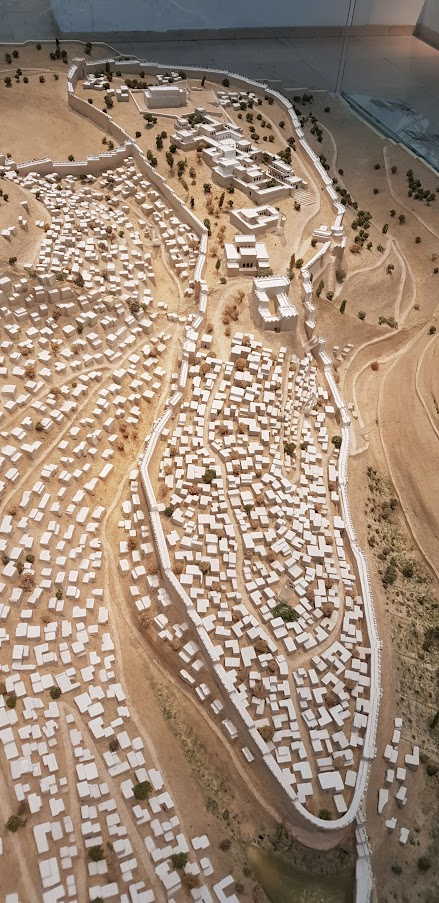
- Model of Jerusalem during the First Temple period. The Ophel and the royal palace area (where the Horse Gate was located) are situated in the eastern part of the city.

- Location within Israel Location within Jerusalem
- Alternative names: Sha'ar HaSusim

General information
- Type: City gate
- Architectural style: Ancient architecture
- Location: Jerusalem, Israel
- Coordinates: 31°46′39″N 35°14′14″E
- Year built: Iron Age (First Temple period)
- Demolished: 586 BCE (by the Babylonians), ultimately 70 CE (by the Romans)

The Horse Gate (שער הסוסים, Sha’ar HaSusim) was one of the ancient, biblical city gates in the defensive walls of ancient Jerusalem. It functioned during the First and Second Temple periods. It was located in the eastern part of the ancient city walls (near the southeastern corner of the sacred precinct), in the immediate vicinity of the royal palace complex and the Temple Mount. It was likely completely destroyed along with the rest of the walls during the Roman siege of Jerusalem in 70 CE. Today, this gate no longer exists within the physical layout of the preserved 16th-century walls of the Old City.

== History and biblical accounts ==
The Horse Gate is mentioned multiple times in the texts of the Old Testament as a key point on the topographical map of ancient Jerusalem:

- Monarchic period: According to the historical account in the 2nd Book of Chronicles, it was precisely at the entrance from the Horse Gate to the royal palace that the usurping queen of Judah, Athaliah (9th century BCE), was captured and executed.

So they seized her, and when she arrived at the entrance of the Horse Gate to the king’s house, they put her to death there.

— 2 Chronicles 23:15

This event emphasizes the close topographical connection of the gate with the main palace buildings. As modern scholars and archaeologists indicate, this gate served as the main, direct communication link between the fortified Temple area and the royal palace. The original gate structure from this period was destroyed in 586 BCE during the capture of Jerusalem by the Babylonian army under Nebuchadnezzar II.

- Rebuilding of Jerusalem: After the end of the Babylonian captivity (5th century BCE), when Nehemiah oversaw the rebuilding of Jerusalem's ruined walls, this gate was reconstructed. The fact that the damaged section above it was repaired by the priests indicates its close proximity to the Temple itself.

Above the Horse Gate the priests made repairs, each in front of his own house.

— Nehemiah 3:28

- Prophecies and city borders: The prophet Jeremiah, in his eschatological vision of the future sanctification and territorial expansion of Jerusalem, lists the corner of the Horse Gate as one of the key boundary points of the renewed city, proclaiming that in the future this entire area will be dedicated to the Lord.

The whole valley of the dead bodies and the ashes, and all the fields as far as the Kidron Valley, to the corner of the Horse Gate to the east, shall be holy to the LORD. It shall not be uprooted or demolished anymore forever.

— Jeremiah 31:40

== Location, function, and archaeological excavations ==
According to topographical analyses, the gate was clearly located on the eastern section of the city walls, north of the Water Gate, opening directly onto the Kidron Valley. It adjoined the Ophel hill and was part of the heavily fortified palace complex.

True to its name, it served as the main paved passageway for horses and chariots used in royal processions or battle, and through which supplies were brought into the city. During the monarchic period (including the reign of King Solomon), monumental royal stables and infrastructure related to the defense of the eastern flank of the palace were located nearby. According to some scholars, it may also have been a fortified, partially underground passage (tunnel) connecting the stables to the areas outside the city, used by warriors after receiving royal orders. It was a gate of great splendor, associated with military might and royal majesty.

The exact archaeological identification of the gate remains a subject of intense research within biblical archaeology. A massive breakthrough was made by the late eminent Israeli archaeologist, Dr. Eilat Mazar. During archaeological excavations in the Ophel area (between the ancient City of David and the Temple Mount), she discovered the remains of a massive four-chambered gate and a defensive tower from the Iron Age II (First Temple period). Mazar ultimately identified this structure specifically as the biblical Horse Gate, relying on the Old Testament placement by Nehemiah.

Some historians and archaeologists further suggest that the multi-chambered defensive structures discovered on the Ophel, as well as the extensive underground structures located in the southeastern corner of the Temple Mount (commonly identified under the ahistorical term "Solomon's Stables" coined during the Crusades), could have been an integral part of the military and logistical infrastructure associated with the ancient Horse Gate.

== See also ==
- Golden Gate (Jerusalem)
- Gates of the Temple Mount
- Biblical archaeology
- Old City (Jerusalem)
- Walls of Jerusalem

== Bibliography ==
- Burrows, Millar. Nehemiah 3: 1-32 as a Source for the Topography of Ancient Jerusalem, "The Annual of the American Schools of Oriental Research", 14, 1933, pp. 115-140.
- Edelman, Diana. The location and function of the towers of Hananʾel and the hundred in Persian-era Jerusalem, "Zeitschrift des Deutschen Palästina-Vereins", 127 (1), 2011, pp. 24-34.
- Finkelstein, Israel. Jerusalem in the Persian (and Early Hellenistic) Period and the wall of Nehemiah, "Journal for the Study of the Old Testament", 32 (4), 2008, pp. 501-520.
- Gibson, Rev. Timothy. The Horse Gate. [Accessed: 2026-07-06].
- Hubbard, R.P.S. The topography of ancient Jerusalem, "Palestine Exploration Quarterly", 98 (2), 1966, pp. 130-154.
- Mazar, Eilat. The Ophel Excavations to the South of the Temple Mount 2009–2013: Final Reports Volume I, Shoham Academic Research and Publication, Jerusalem 2011.
- Na'aman, Nadav. Five Notes on Jerusalem in the First and Second Temple Periods, "Tel Aviv", 39 (1), 2012, pp. 93-103.
- Na'aman, Nadav. Manasseh's Wall and Construction Operations on the Western Slope of the Southeastern Hill of Jerusalem, "Tel Aviv", 2025.
- Paton, Lewis B. Jerusalem in Bible Times: VIII. Solomon's Wall, "The Biblical World", 30 (1), 1907, pp. 22-31.
- Stager, Lawrence E. The Archaeology of the East Slope of Jerusalem and the Terraces of the Kidron, "Journal of Near Eastern Studies", 41 (2), 1982, pp. 111-121.
- Swanson, Dennis M. Expansion of Jerusalem in Jer 31:38-40: Never, Already or Not Yet?, "The Master's Seminary Journal", 17 (1), 2006, pp. 17-34.
- Van Laar, Patricia. Nehemiah 3 – The Gates of Jerusalem: The Horse Gate, "Faith in Focus", 2006.
