= Costner =

Costner is a surname. Notable people and fictional characters include:

- Brandon Costner (born 1987), basketball player
- Caleb Costner
- Chris Costner Sizemore (1927–2016), a textbook multiple personality disorder sufferer
- George Costner (1923–2002), boxer
- Kevin Costner (born 1955), actor and director
- Michael Costner
- Pat Costner
- Tony Costner

== Fictional characters ==
- Michael Costner, fictional character from American comic books published by DC Comics

== See also ==
- Costner, Kastner, Kästner/Kaestner, Kestner, Kostner, Köstner/Koestner
