= Akkra =

AKKRA may refer to:

- Accra, the capital city of Ghana
- Acra (fortress) in Jerusalem during the Hellenistic period
- Aqrah, city of Iraq
- Akkra, a type of fritter
