= Kastner =

Kastner is a German language surname, originating from the medieval occupation Kastner ("bursary officer"). Notable people with the surname include:

- Bruno Kastner (1890–1932), German actor
- Daniel Kastner (born 1981), Austrian footballer
- Daniel L. Kastner (fl. 2020), American researcher and physician
- Elliott Kastner (1930–2010), American film producer
- Hermann Kastner (1886–1957), German politician
- Jean-Georges Kastner (1810–1867), French composer and musicologist
- John Kastner (born 1969), Canadian musician and composer
- Karl Wilhelm Gottlob Kastner (1783–1857), chemist, natural scientist
- Kas Kastner, racing driver, racing car builder, racing team manager
- Marc A. Kastner (born 1945), American physicist
- Peter Kastner (1943 – 2008), Canadian born actor
- Rudolf Kastner (1906–1957), Jewish-Hungarian lawyer, head of the Hungarian Aid and Rescue Committee during the Holocaust
  - Kastner train, after Rudolf Kastner
- Sabine Kastner (* 1964), German-born American cognitive neuroscientist

== See also ==
- Costner, Kastner, Kästner/Kaestner, Kestner, Kostner, Köstner/Koestner
