= Ophel =

Hebrew Bible term for urban elevation

Coordinates: 31°46′27″N 35°14′10″E

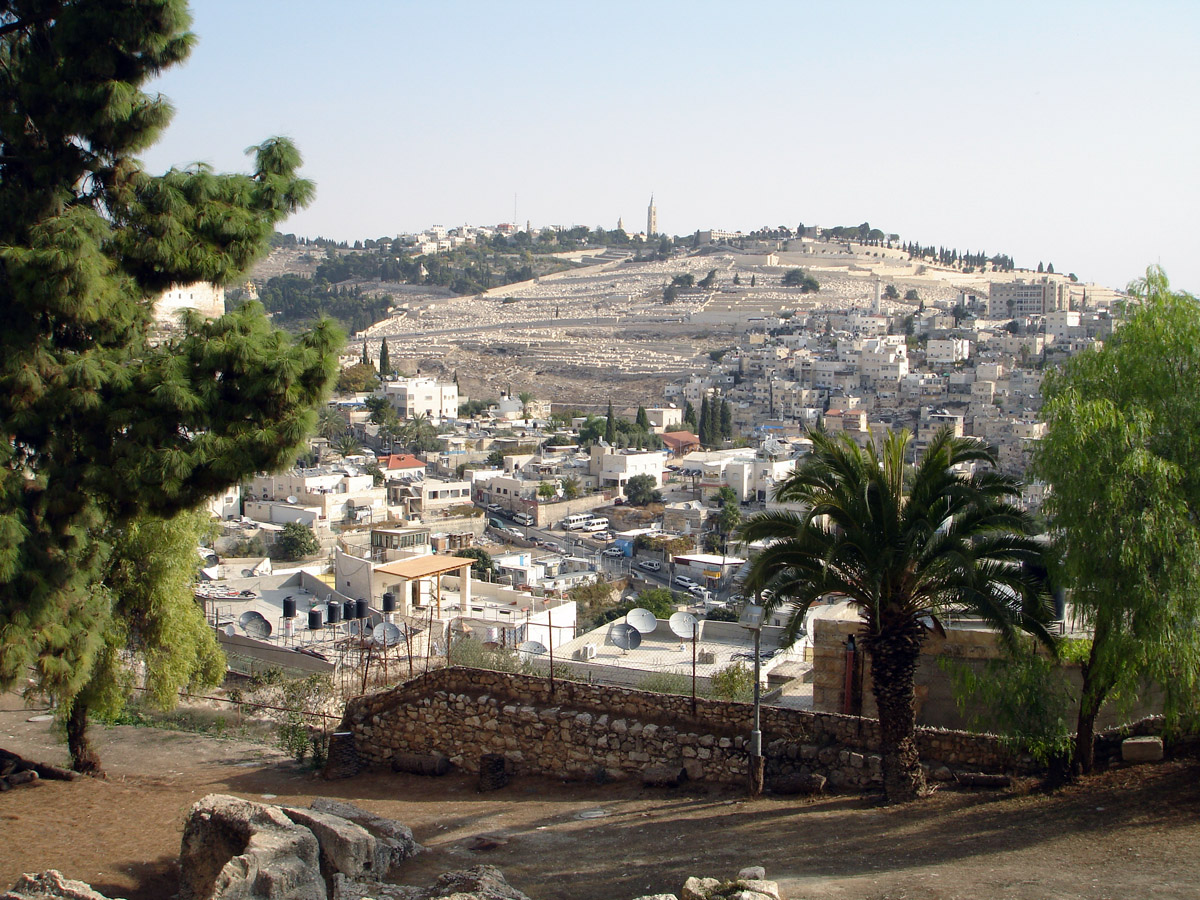
The ophel of Jerusalem. The Kidron Valley and Mount of Olives are in the background.

Ophel (Hebrew: עֹפֶל, romanized: ʿōp̄el) is the Hebrew biblical term for an elevated part of a settlement or city, higher than its surroundings, probably meaning a fortified hill or risen area. In the Hebrew Bible, the Ophel refers to two cities: Jerusalem (mentioned in 2 Chronicles 27, 2 Chronicles 33, Nehemiah 3, and Nehemiah 11) and Samaria (mentioned in 2 Kings 5). The Mesha Stele, written in Moabite, a Canaanite language closely related to Biblical Hebrew, is the only extra-biblical source using the word, also in connection to a fortified place.

== Meaning of the term ==
Ophel, with the definite article ha-ophel, is a common noun known from two Canaanitic languages, Biblical Hebrew and Moabitic. As a place name or description, it appears several times in the Hebrew Bible and once on the Mesha Stele from Moab. The word’s precise meaning(s) may not have full consensus among all scholars, given the varied contexts in which Ophel appears. When used as a common noun, it has been translated as "tumors" (1 Samuel 5:9, 12; 6:5), and in a verb form it was taken to mean "puffed up" (Habakkuk 2:4), this indicating that the root might be associated with "swelling". When referring to a place, it seems from the context to mean either hill, or fortified place, or a mixture of the two, i.e., a fortified hill, and by considering the presumed meaning of the root, it might signify a "bulging or rounded" fortification.

Biblical verses in which it has been translated either as "fortified place " (tower, citadel, stronghold etc.) or "hill" are 2 Kings 5:24, 2 Chronicles 27:3; 33:14, Isaiah 32:14, Nehemiah 3:26; 11:21, and Micah 4:8. On the Mesha Stele, named for the king of Moab who erected it, Mesha says: "I built Q-R-CH-H (Karhah?), the wall of ye'arim [forests], and the wall of ophel and I built its gates and I built its towers." Here ophel is commonly translated as "citadel".

== Jerusalem ophel ==
=== Hebrew Bible ===
The location of the ophel of the Hebrew Bible can be deduced from references in 2 Chronicles and Nehemiah: It was on the eastern ridge, which descended south of Solomon's Temple, and probably near the middle of it. In current terms, the still extant Herodian cased-in Temple Mount is bordered to the south by a saddle, followed by the ridge in case, also known as the southeastern hill, which stretches down to the King's Garden and the lower Pool of Siloam. If the ophel was, as it seems, close to its centre, the use of the term "ophel ridge" for the entire southeastern hill including the saddle, seems to be wrong.

Two kings of Judah, Jotham and Manasseh, are described to have massively strengthened the ophel fortifications in 2 Chronicles 27:3 and 33:14, leading to the conclusion that this must have been an area of great strategic importance, and either very close to or identical with the "stronghold of Zion" conquered and reused by David in 2 Samuel 5:7).

=== Josephus' "Ophlas" ===
Josephus, writing about the First Jewish–Roman War (66–70 CE), uses the Graecised form "Ophlas" and places it slightly higher up the eastern ridge from the First Temple-period ophel, touching the "eastern cloister of the temple" (Jewish Wars, V, iv, 2) and in the context of "the temple and the parts thereto adjoining ... and the ... 'Valley of the Cedron'" (Jewish Wars, V, iv, 1). This takes us to the area of the saddle right next to the southeast corner of Herod's Temple Mount.

=== Mount Ophel excavation ===
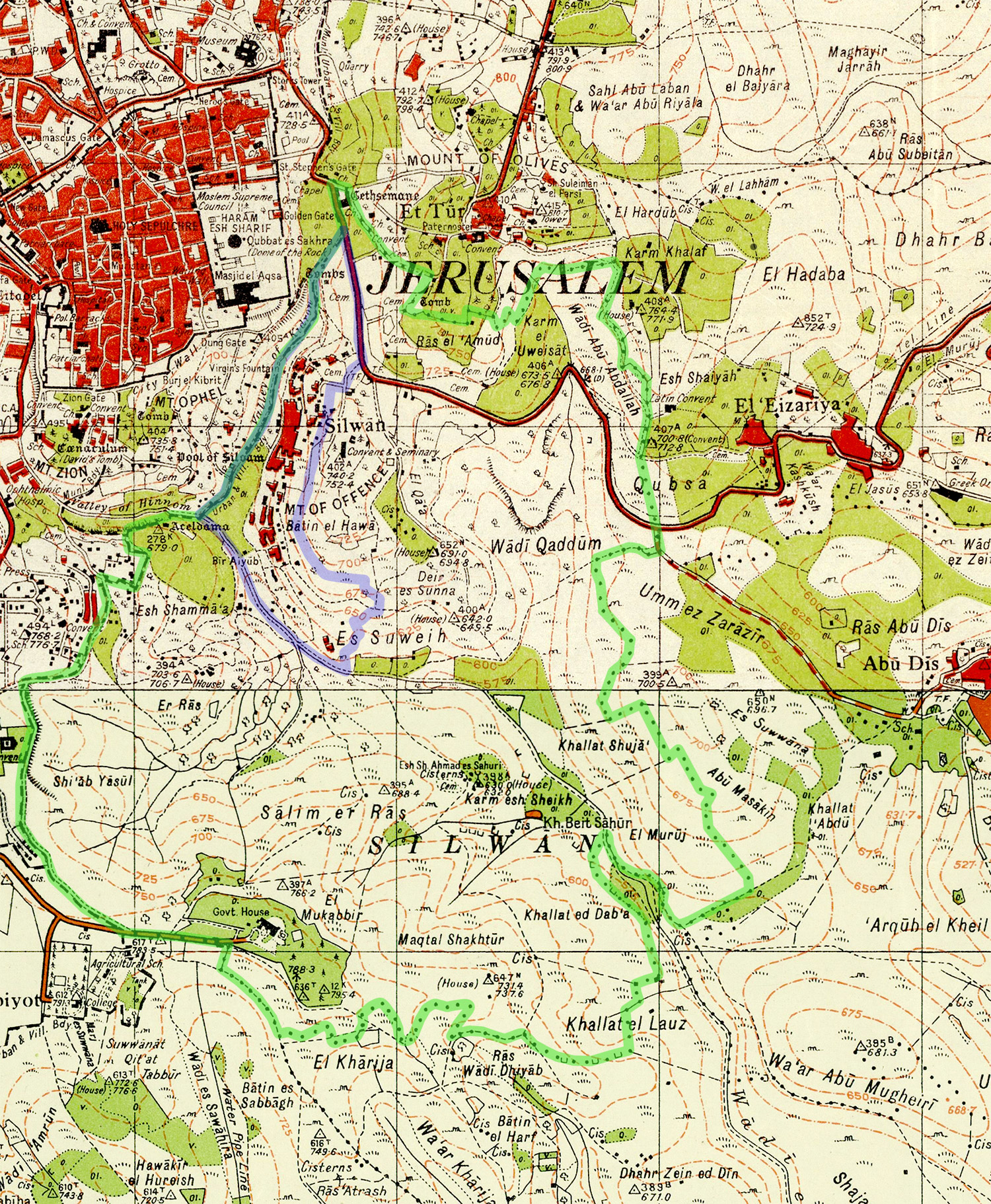
Map of Jerusalem, 1943, Mt. Ophel shown South of the Old City Wall

Benjamin Mazar and Eilat Mazar began excavating an area known as Jerusalem's Ophel in 1968. It was referred to by archaeologists as Mount Ophel during the British period and it appears as "Mt. Ophel" or "Ophel" on old maps of the era. Today the area is referred to as the City of David by archaeologists and tourists. It is commonly referred to as the Wadi Hilweh neighborhood by local residents. The excavation was a joint project of Hebrew University, in cooperation with the Israel Antiquities Authority, the Israel Nature and Parks Authority, and the East Jerusalem Development Company, with funding provided by Jewish American couple, Daniel Mintz and Meredith Berkman.

Notable structures found during these excavations include architectural remains and a variety of movable objects, some dated to the First Temple period, many to the Second Temple period, as well as the Byzantine and Early Muslim periods, the latter including major findings from the Umayyad and Fatimid periods.

==== Canaanite or First Temple period findings ====
A discovered artefact of particular importance is the Ophel inscription, a 3,000-year-old pottery shard that bears the earliest alphabetical inscription found in Jerusalem.

==== First Temple period findings ====
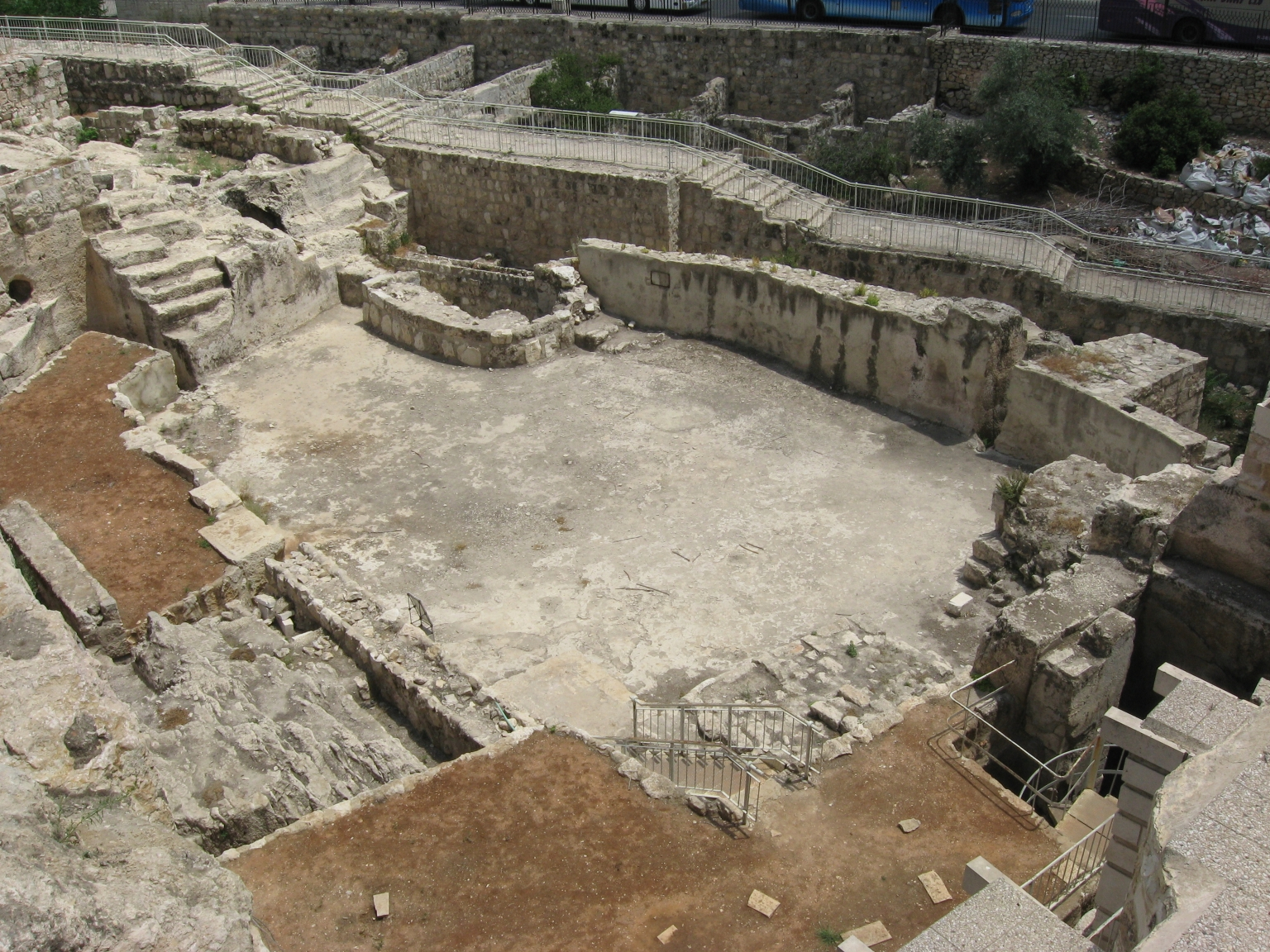
A Second Temple-era pool excavated in the ophel

The findings included remains interpreted by Eilat Mazar to be a 70- or 79-metre-long segment of city wall including a gatehouse leading to a royal structure, and a watchtower overlooking the Kidron Valley. Mazar believes these are the remains of the fortifications that, according to the biblical First Book of Kings, once encompassed the city. Eilat Mazar, who re-excavated the remains from 2009 to 2013, dated them to the late 10th century BCE and linked them to King Solomon, a conclusion challenged by other archaeologists.

==== Hellenistic Period findings ====
Several period buildings

==== Roman Period (Herodian Temple-related) findings ====
A large mikvah, the southern steps to the Herodian Temple compound, leading up to the Double and Triple Gates of the Temple compound.

A massive purification complex, consisting of three ritual baths and a rectangular pool. Archaeologist Uzi Leibner said the purpose of the rectangular pool could have been to purify vessels.

==== Byzantine period finding ====
The Monastery of the Virgins.

==== Umayyad period findings ====
Several large residential and administrative structures (qasr-type "palaces"), probably Umayyad, to the south of the Ophel and southwest of the Haram/Temple Mount.

==== Archaeological assessment ====
===== Dating of the Wall =====
Although consensus on the dating of the wall has not been reached by the archaeological community, Mazar maintains that, "It's the most significant construction we have from First Temple days in Israel," and "It means that at that time, the 10th century (BCE), in Jerusalem there was a regime capable of carrying out such construction." The 10th century is the period the Bible describes as the reign of King Solomon. Claiming that broken pottery in the "royal structure" enabled the team to date the building. One storage jar bears an inscription in Hebrew. Mazar told the Jerusalem Post that "The jars that were found are the largest ever found in Jerusalem," and "the inscription found on one of them shows that it belonged to a government official, apparently the person responsible for overseeing the provision of baked goods to the royal court."

Aren Maeir, an archeology professor at Bar Ilan University said he has yet to see evidence that the fortifications are as old as Mazar claims. Whilst acknowledging that 10th century remains have been found in Jerusalem, he describes proof of a strong, centralized kingdom at that time as "tenuous".

===== Structural Features =====
A section of wall 79 metres (259 ft) long and 6 metres (20 ft) high has been uncovered. The discoveries include an inner gatehouse, a "royal structure" and a corner tower with a base measuring 23 metres (75 ft) by 18 metres (59 ft) from which watchmen could keep watch on the Kidron Valley. According to Mazar, the built structures are similar to the First Temple era fortifications of Megiddo, Beersheba and Ashdod. Mazar told reporters that "A comparison of this latest finding with city walls and gates from the period of the First Temple, as well as pottery found at the site," enable her to "postulate, with a great degree of assurance" that the wall dates from the late 10th-century BCE.

Mazar told reporters that "A comparison of this latest finding with city walls and gates from the period of the First Temple, as well as pottery found at the site, enable us to postulate, with a great degree of assurance, that the wall that has been revealed is that which was built by King Solomon in Jerusalem in the latter part of the tenth century BCE."

===== Previous excavations =====
The wall has been excavated twice before, once in the 1860s and again in the 1980s. In 1867 Charles Warren conducted an underground survey in the area, describing the outline of a large tower but without attributing it to the era of Solomon.

===== Criticism of approach =====
Israel Finkelstein and other archaeologists from Tel Aviv University have flagged concern that, with reference to her 2006 dating of the "Solomonic city wall" in the area to the south of the Temple Mount known as the ophel, stating "the biblical text dominates this field operation, not archaeology. Had it not been for Mazar's literal reading of the biblical text, she never would have dated the remains to the 10th century BCE with such confidence".

== Samaria Ophel ==
2 Kings 5:24 speaks of the ophel of Samaria, where Gehazi took the presents he received from Naaman of Aram. Traditionally translated as "hill", it can as well have meant "tower" and can quite likely be understood as a spot in the city wall or its citadel.

== King Mesha's Ophel ==
Here, too, the context indicates part of a fortification—either a fortified hill, or something like a tower or enceinte and, judging by the root of the word, probably a bulging or rounded one.

== See also ==
- Acropolis – similar concept in ancient Greek architecture

For the Jerusalem Ophel

- Acra (fortress)
- Desert castles: Umayyad qasr-type palaces including Qasr al-Minya and Al-Sinnabra on the Sea of Galilee
- Excavations at the Temple Mount
- Givati Parking Lot dig
- Jerusalem pilgrim road a.k.a. the stepped pilgrimage road
- Jerusalem Water Channel, actually the drainage under the stepped pilgrimage road
- Millo
- Ophel Treasure, a gold hoard from the early 7th century
