= Kostner =

Kostner is a German and Dutch surname and also a germanised version of the Ladin surname Costa.

== Notable people ==
- Aaron Kostner (born 1999), Italian Nordic combined skier
- Carolina Kostner (born 1987), Italian figure skater
- Diego Kostner (born 1992), Italian professional ice hockey
- Erwin Kostner (born 1958), Italian ice hockey coach and former player
- Isolde Kostner (born 1975), Italian Alpine skier
- Michael Kostner (born 1969), German football coach and a player
- Patrick Kostner (born 1988), Austrian footballer
- Simon Kostner (born 1990), Italian ice hockey forward
- Ulrico Kostner (born 1946), retired Italian cross-country skier

== See also ==
- Koster (surname)
- Costner, Kastner, Kästner/Kaestner, Kestner, Kostner, Köstner/Koestner
