= Kästner =

Kästner (transliterated Kaestner) is a German surname. Notable people with the surname include:

- Abraham Gotthelf Kästner (1719–1800), German mathematician
  - Kästner (crater), a lunar crater
- Detlef Kästner (born 1958), German boxer
- Erich Kästner (1899–1974), German author
  - (12318) Kästner asteroid named after Erich Kästner
- Erich Kästner (camera designer) (1911–2005), German movie camera designer
- Erich Kästner (World War I veteran) (1900–2008), the last known German veteran of the First World War
- Mercedes Kaestner-Varnado (born 1992), American professional wrestler known as Sasha Banks
- Peter Kaestner (born 1953), American foreign service officer and ornithologist

== Other ==
- Louis Kaestner, fictional character in the period political crime drama Boardwalk Empire, one of the main protagonists in the first season and one of the two main antagonists in the second season

== See also ==
- Costner, Kastner, Kästner/Kaestner, Kestner, Kostner, Köstner/Koestner
