= Verger =

Assistant in church services

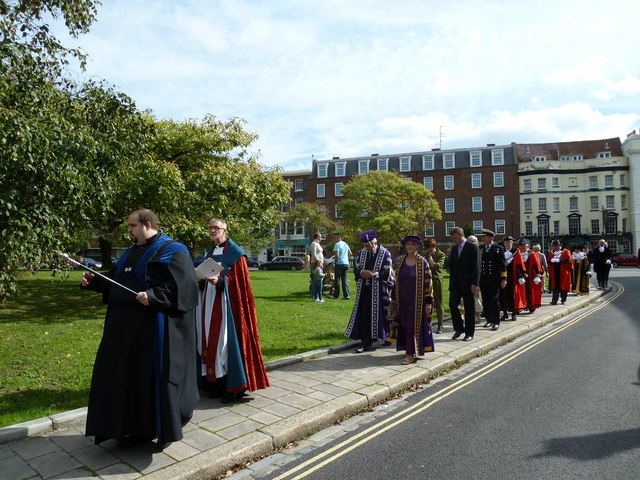
Verger of Portsmouth Cathedral (left) leads the bishop in procession.

A verger (or virger, so called after the staff of the office, or wandsman in British English though archaic) is a person, usually a layperson, who assists in the ordering of religious services, particularly in Anglican churches.

== Etymology ==
A traditional virge; note the brass ball at the end with a small cross on top

The title of verger arises from the ceremonial rod they traditionally carry known as a virge (from the Latin virga, "branch, staff, rod"; see virgule). The Maces of State used in the House of Lords and the House of Commons of the British Parliament are examples of another modern use of the medieval virge. According to the Albuquerque Journal, in former times, a verger might have needed to use his virge to keep back animals or an overenthusiastic crowd from the personage he was escorting or even to discipline unruly choristers.

== History ==
The office of verger has its roots in the early days of the Church of England's history. The Order shares certain similarities with the former Minor Orders of Porter and Acolyte. Historically, vergers were responsible for the order and upkeep of a house of worship, including the care of the church buildings, its furnishings, and sacred relics, preparations for liturgy, conduct of the laity, and grave-digging responsibilities. Although there is no definitive historical examination of the office of verger, evidence from Rochester, Lincoln, Exeter, and Salisbury Cathedrals points to the existence of vergers even in the 16th century. Koster is the Dutch word for 'sexton' or 'verger' (the equivalent German word is Küster), derived from the Latin custos ('guard'). The symbol of a guild of cathedral vergers is the crossed keys.

== Duties ==
During the service itself, a verger's main duty is ceremonially to precede the religious participants as they move about the church; they do not typically take any speaking part in the service itself. It could be argued that a verger's main pride during a service lies in their inconspicuousness; vergers often play a very prominent role "behind the scenes"—helping to plan the logistical details of service and discreetly shepherding the clergy through it (in some churches these latter duties are handled by a Master of Ceremonies, while the verger functions as a sort of marshal in the procession).

== Robes ==
The typical robes of a verger are a black gown worn over a black cassock. The gown is somewhat like an academic gown and is open-fronted in the English tradition. It is common for a verger's gown to bear the arms of the church, usually on one or both sleeves. It can be trimmed with velvet, which may be in another colour (a colour prominently associated with the cathedral, for instance). Formally, a jabot may be worn at the neck.

Less formally, a verger may wear a gown without a cassock below, or, conversely, a cassock without the gown. In more modern settings, a verger might wear a scapular instead of a gown.

If a verger also serves at the altar during divine worship, the gown is often replaced with a surplice.

== Modern function ==
Some vergers see their role as one of welcoming or hospitality, encompassing duties such as arranging weddings and funerals or meeting important visitors such as bishops. Vergers at Westminster Abbey, for example, also lead guided tours.

In small churches, the office of the verger is often combined with that of the sexton, who is responsible for maintaining church buildings and grounds. In some organizations the functions of the sexton and the verger are performed by the same person. Equally, many churches have neither a verger nor a sexton and these duties fall to the churchwardens.

In 20th-century debates in the Anglican Church in Australia, some clergy argued that women should be allowed to serve as churchwardens because their experience in housekeeping would lead them to check up on the work of the vergers, indicating that many vergers performed maintenance.

== Catholic Church ==
The office of the verger has, for the most part, disappeared in the Catholic tradition, the closest function being that of the sexton or the head sacristan; or that of the senior usher, particularly in those churches (usually large establishments, like St. Patrick's Cathedral in New York City or the Basilica of the National Shrine of the Immaculate Conception in Washington, DC) that have a formal, organized corps of ushers.

== Cultural references ==
Perhaps the best-known portrait of an Anglican verger in fiction is in Somerset Maugham's short story "The Verger". In British popular culture, the BBC sitcom Dad's Army featured a bumbling caricature of a verger named Maurice Yeatman, played by Edward Sinclair. The sitcom The Vicar of Dibley, whose title character is among the Church of England's first female vicars, also featured a female verger, the dim-witted but well-intentioned Alice Tinker (Emma Chambers).

== See also ==
- Acolyte
- Altar server
- Churchwarden
- Lictor
- Sacristan

== General and cited references ==
- Clements, Matthew (2018). Rotas, Rules and Rectors – How to Thrive being a Churchwarden. London: Matador. ISBN 978-1-78901-631-4.
