= Köstner =

Köstner or Koestner is a German surname. It can either be a toponymic surname derived from a place named Kösten or Köstenberg, or an occupational surname derived from the occupation of kastner, the manager of the lord's possessions, treasurer. Notable people with the surname include:

- August Köstner (1912–1982), German wrestler
- Eduardo Javier Rubio Köstner (born 1983, Chuquicamata), a Chilean international footballer
- Elmer Koestner (1885–1959), a Major League Baseball pitcher
- Joseph Köstner (1906–1982), Austrian bishop
- Lorenz-Günther Köstner (born 1952), a German footballer
- Nikolai Köstner
- Sascha Köstner (born 1975), German table tennis player
- Walter Köstner (born 1936), German fencer

== Koestner ==
- Elmer Koestner (1885–1959), American baseball player
- Katie Koestner (born 1972), American activist against sexual assault

== See also ==
- Costner, Kastner, Kästner/Kaestner, Kestner, Kostner, Köstner/Koestner
