= Coster =

Coster is a Dutch occupational surname. Notable people with the surname include:

- Anne Vallayer-Coster (1744–1818), French painter
- Arnold Coster (born 1976), Dutch mountaineers
- Charles Coster (1837–1888), American soldier and public official
- Charles De Coster (1827–1879), Belgian novelist
- Dick Coster (born 1946), Dutch sailor, father of Sven and Kalle Coster
- Dirk Coster (1889–1950), Dutch physicist
  - Coster–Kronig transition named after him
- Elizabeth Coster (born 1982), New Zealand swimmer
- Francis Coster (1532–1619), Flemish Jesuit theologian
- Henry Arnold Coster (c1840-1917), prominent American included in Ward McAllister's "Four Hundred"
- Herman Coster (1865–1899), Dutch lawyer and soldier
- Howard Coster (1885–1959), British photographer
- Janet Coster, English operatic mezzo-soprano
- John Gerard Coster (1762–1844), Dutch-American merchant
- John Coster (1838–1886), New Zealand politician
- Kalle Coster (born 1982), Dutch sailor, son of Dick Coster
- Keith Coster (1920–2012), South African army officer
- Laurens Janszoon Coster (c. 1370–c. 1440), Dutch printer
- Moses Elias Coster (c.1791–1848), Dutch diamond cutter
- Nick Coster (born 1985), Dutch footballer
- Nicolas Coster (1934–2023), British-born American actor
- Ritchie Coster (born 1967), English actor
- Salomon Coster (c. 1620–1659), Dutch clockmaker
- Samuel Coster (1579–1665), Dutch playwright
- Stan Coster (1930–1997), Australian country musician
- Sven Coster (born 1978), Dutch sailor, son of Dick Coster
- Tom Coster (born 1941), American musician, father of Tommy
- Tommy Coster (born 1966), American Grammy Award winning composer/producer and Jazz Pianist
- Tracy Coster (born 1966), Australian country music singer
- Willem Jacobszoon Coster (1590–1640), Dutch Governor of Ceylon

Coster-Waldau

- Nikolaj Coster-Waldau (born 1970), Danish actor
- Nukaaka Coster-Waldau (born 1971), Greenlandic singer, actress, and model

== See also ==
- Koster (surname)
- De Coster
