= Acra (fortress) =

2nd-century BCE fortified place in Jerusalem

The Acra
- Ἄκρα (Ancient Greek) חקרא ,חקרה (Hebrew)
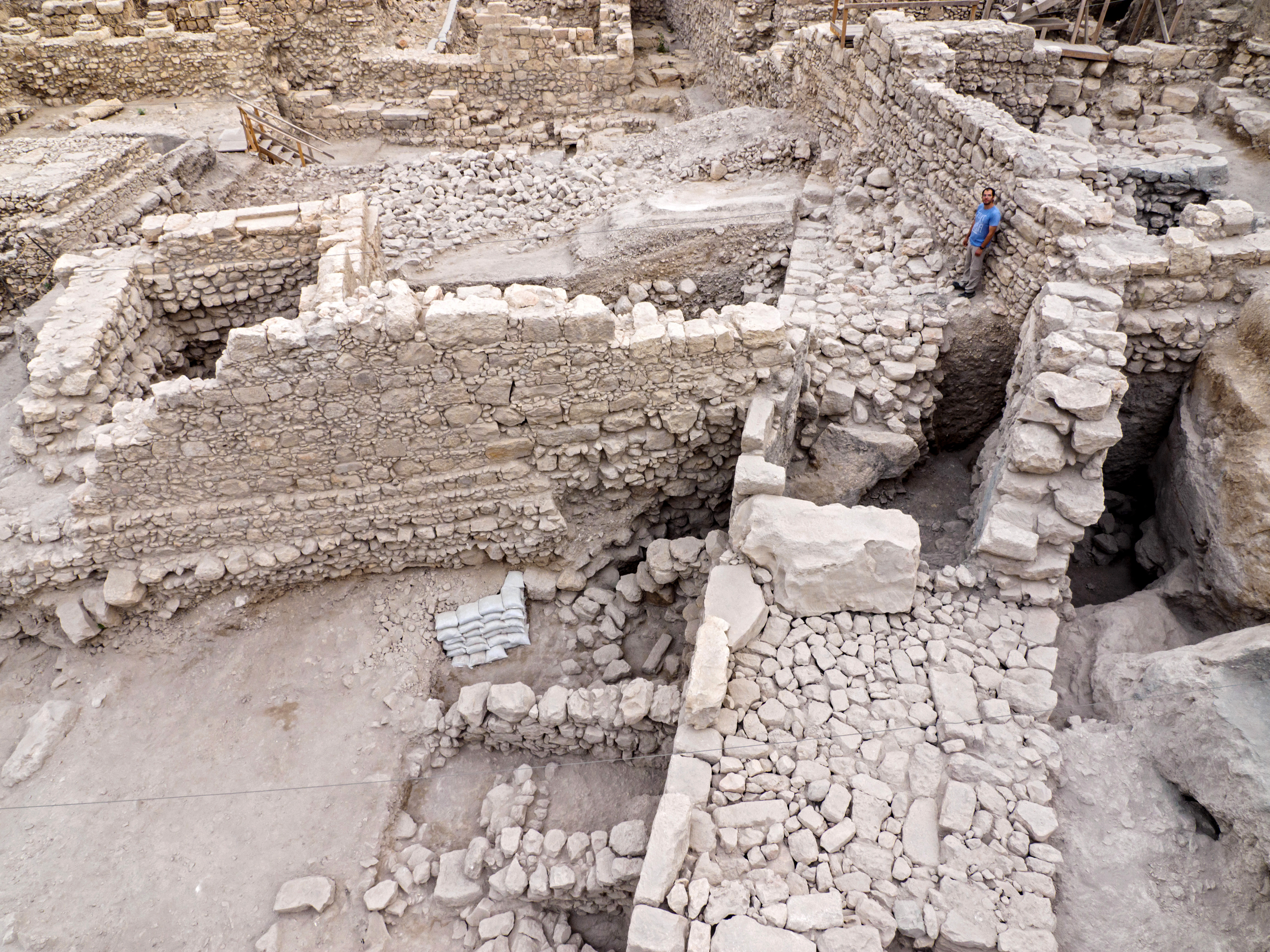
- Givati Parking Lot dig
- Interactive map of The Acra
- 31°46′28″N 35°14′07″E
- Type: Fortress
- Periods: Hellenistic
- Location: Jerusalem

History
- Built: 2nd century BCE
- Built by: Antiochus Epiphanes
- Abandoned: 2nd century BCE

Site notes
- Material: Stone
- Excavation dates: 1960s, 70s, 2010s
- Archaeologists: Benjamin Mazar (for Ophel location).; Doron Ben-Ami, Yana Tchekhanovets, Salome Cohen (for Givati parking lot location).
- Condition: Ruined
- Public access: Yes

The Acra (also spelled Akra, from Ancient Greek: Ἄκρα, Hebrew: חקרא ,חקרה Ḥaqra(h)), meaning "stronghold" (see under "Etymology"), was a location in Jerusalem thought to have contained a fortified compound built by Antiochus Epiphanes, ruler of the Seleucid Empire, following his sack of the city in 168 BCE. The name Acra was also used at a later time for a city quarter probably associated with the by-then destroyed fortress, known to Josephus (first century CE) as both Acra and "the lower city". The fortress played a significant role in the events surrounding the Maccabean Revolt, which resulted in the formation of the Hasmonean Kingdom. The "upper city" was captured by Judas Maccabeus, with the Seleucid garrison taking refuge in the "Acra" below. The task of destroying this last enemy stronghold inside Jerusalem fell to Simon Maccabeus surnamed Thassi. Knowledge about the Acra is based almost exclusively on the writings of Josephus, which are of a later date, and on the First and Second Books of Maccabees, which were written not long after the described events.

The exact location of Acra within Jerusalem, and even the meaning of the term—fortress, fortified compound inside the city, or compound with an associated fortress—is critical to understanding Hellenistic Jerusalem, but it remains a matter of ongoing discussion. The fact that Josephus used the name interchangeably with 'the lower city' certainly does not help. Historians and archaeologists have proposed various sites around Jerusalem, relying initially mainly on conclusions drawn from literary evidence. This approach began to change in the light of excavations which commenced in the late 1960s. New discoveries have prompted reassessments of the ancient literary sources, Jerusalem's geography, and previously discovered artifacts. The more recent theories combine archaeological and textual evidence and favour locations near the Temple Mount and south of it, but there are alternative theories as well (see "Location").

The ancient Greek term acra was used to describe other fortified structures during the Hellenistic period. The Acra is often called the Seleucid Acra to distinguish it from references to the Ptolemaic Baris as an acra and from the later city quarter of Jerusalem which inherited the name Acra.

== Etymology ==
Acra is a shortened form of the Greek akrópolis, adopted in Aramaic usage and connotating "citadel" or "stronghold".

== History ==
=== Background ===
Below are the events leading up to the Maccabean Revolt in which the Acra played an important role, based again mainly on Josephus' Antiquities of the Jews and the First and Second Book of Maccabees.

Following Alexander the Great's death in 323 BCE, Coele-Syria was contested between the Ptolemaic Kingdom in Egypt, and the Seleucid Empire based in Syria and Mesopotamia. Seleucid emperor Antiochus III's victory over Egypt in the Battle of Panium brought Coele-Syria under Seleucid control. The Jewish population of Jerusalem had aided Antiochus during his siege of the Baris, the fortified base of the Egyptian garrison in Jerusalem. Their support was rewarded with a charter affirming Jewish religious autonomy, including barring foreigners and impure animals from the Temple precincts, and an allocation of official funds for the maintenance of certain religious rituals in the Temple. Despite being allowed religious freedom, many Jews were enticed by and adopted elements of the prestigious and influential Greek lifestyle. The imperial culture offered a route to political and material advancement, and this led to the formation of Hellenistic elites among the Jewish population. Hellenization produced tensions between observant Jews and their brethren who had assimilated Greek culture.

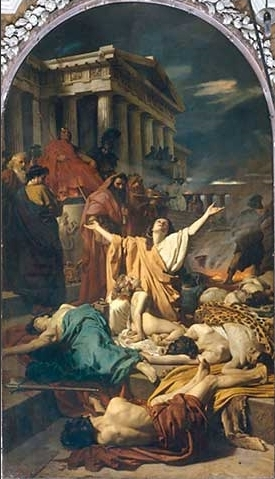
Antonio Ciseri's Martyrdom of the Maccabees (1863), depicting an episode from Antiochus IV's (seated) persecution of the Jews.

Antiochus IV Epiphanes ascended the Seleucid throne in 175 BCE. Shortly afterward, Epiphanes was petitioned by Jason for appointment to the position of High Priest of Israel—an office occupied by his brother Onias III. Jason, himself thoroughly Hellenized, furthermore promised to increase the tribute paid by the city and to establish within it the infrastructure of a Greek polis, including a gymnasium and an ephebion. Jason's petition was granted, yet after a 42-month rule he was ousted by Antiochus and forced to flee to Ammon. In the meantime, Antiochus IV had launched two invasions of Egypt, in 170 BCE and again in 169 BCE, and routed the Ptolemaic armies. Antiochus' victories were short-lived. His intent to unify the Seleucid and Ptolemaic kingdoms alarmed the rapidly expanding Roman state, which demanded that he withdraw his forces from Egypt. With Antiochus engaged in Egypt, a false rumor spread in Jerusalem that he had been killed. In the ensuing uncertainty, Jason gathered a force of 1,000 followers and attempted to take Jerusalem by storm. Although the attack was repulsed, when word of the fighting reached Antiochus in Egypt, he suspected his Judean subjects of exploiting his setback as an opportunity to revolt. In 168 BCE, Antiochus IV Epiphanes marched on and sacked Jerusalem, looting the temple treasury and killing thousands of its residents. Reversing his father's policy, Antiochus IV issued decrees outlawing traditional Jewish rites and persecuting observant Jews. Temple rituals were discontinued, Jewish observance of Sabbath prohibited, and circumcision outlawed.

=== Construction ===
To consolidate his hold on the city, monitor events on the Temple Mount and safeguard the Hellenized faction in Jerusalem, Antiochus stationed a Seleucid garrison in the city:

Then they fortified the city of David with a great strong wall and strong towers, and it became their citadel. And they stationed there a sinful people, lawless men. These strengthened their position; they stored up arms and food, and collecting the spoils of Jerusalem they stored them there, and became a great snare. It became an ambush against the sanctuary, an evil adversary of Israel continually.

— 1 Maccabees 1:33–36.

The name Acra derived from the Greek acropolis signifies a lofty fortified place overlooking a town. In Jerusalem, the word came to symbolize anti-Jewish paganism: a fortress of the "impious and wicked". Dominating both the city and the surrounding countryside, it was occupied not only by a Greek garrison but by their Jewish confederates as well.

The Seleucid suppression of Jewish religious life met with considerable resistance among the native population. While Antiochus was occupied in the east during 167 BCE, a rural priest, Mattathias of Modiin, raised a rebellion against the empire. Both the Seleucid administration and the local Hellenized faction failed to grasp the magnitude of the revolt. In 164 BCE Judas Maccabaeus liberated Jerusalem and reconsecrated the Temple. Although the surrounding city had fallen, the Acra and its inhabitants held out. Maccabaeus besieged the fortress, whose inhabitants sent an appeal to the Seleucid king (now Antiochus V) for assistance. A Seleucid army was dispatched to put down the revolt. When it laid siege to Beth-Zur, Maccabaeus was forced to abandon his siege of the Acra and face Antiochus in battle. In the subsequent Battle of Beth-Zechariah, the Seleucids won their first victory over the Maccabees, and Maccabaeus was forced to withdraw. Spared from capitulation, the Acra persisted as a Seleucid stronghold for 20 more years during which it weathered several Hasmonean attempts to oust the Greek garrison.

=== Destruction ===
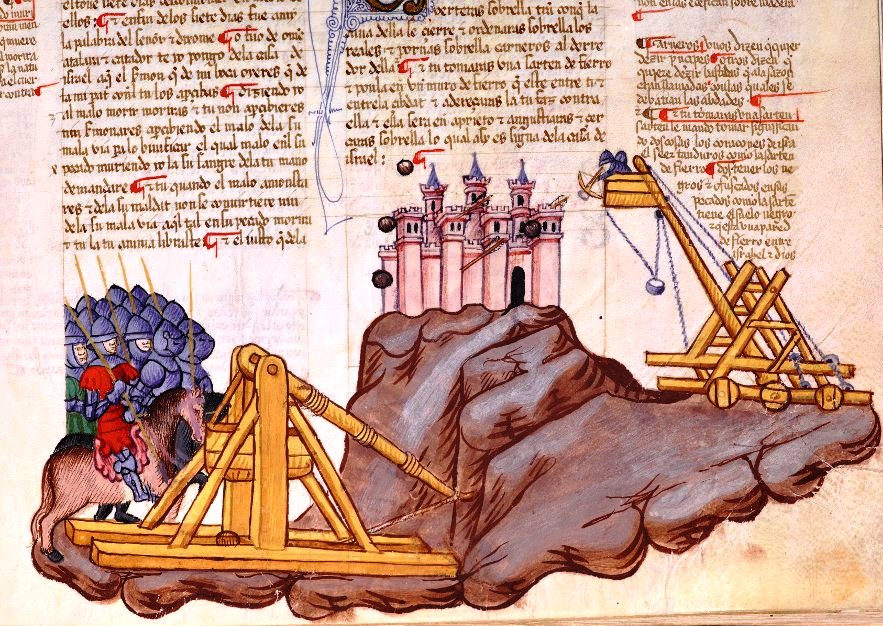
Judas besieging the Acra (Alba Bible, 1430)

Judas was killed in 160 BCE and succeeded by his brother Jonathan, who attempted to build a barrier to cut off the Acra's supply line. Jonathan had already assembled the manpower required for the task when he was forced to confront the invading army of Seleucid general Diodotus Tryphon at Beth Shan (Scythopolis). Having invited Jonathan to a friendly conference, Tryphon had him seized and murdered. Jonathan was succeeded by another brother, Simon, who besieged and finally captured the Acra in 141 BCE.

Two sources provide information about the ultimate fate of the Acra, although their accounts are contradictory in places. According to Josephus, Simon razed the Acra after ousting its inhabitants, and then quarried the hill on which it had stood to render it lower than the temple, purge the city of its evil memory and deny it to any future occupier of Jerusalem. The account appearing in 1 Maccabees paints a different picture:

And Simon decreed that every year they should celebrate this day with rejoicing. He strengthened the fortifications of the temple hill alongside the citadel [Greek: Acra], and he and his men dwelt there.

— 1 Maccabees 13:52.

Thus in this version, Simon did not immediately demolish the Acra, but instead had it occupied and may even have resided within it himself. 1 Maccabees does not mention its ultimate fate. The fortress had been built as an internal checkpoint to monitor and control Jerusalem and its population. If situated in the City of David as most scholars agree, its location would have added very little to Jerusalem's defenses against external threats. It may have fallen out of use and been dismantled around the end of the 2nd century BCE following the construction of the Hasmonean Baris and Hasmonean Palace in Jerusalem's upper city.

Bezalel Bar-Kochva offers a different theory: The Acra was still standing in 139 BCE when Antiochus VII Sidetes demanded it back from Simon, along with Jaffa and Gezer, two Hellenized cities Simon had captured. Simon was willing to discuss the two cities but made no mention of the Acra. It was at this point that he must have sealed its fate, as a way to deny the Seleucids any future claim or hold on Jerusalem. Thus, when Antiochus VII subdued the city during Hyrcanus I's reign, each and every one of his demands were met—except the one demanding the stationing of a Seleucid garrison in the city. Hyrcanus may have been able to reject, and Antiochus to drop, this demand because there was nowhere to billet the garrison, as the Acra would no longer have been standing. This explanation places the razing of the Acra somewhere in the 130s BCE.

=== Acra during the First Jewish–Roman War ===
Josephus describes Acra, or the "Lower City", during the outbreak of the First Jewish–Roman War. He makes known the internecine struggle between two Jewish factions, the one led by John of Gischala who controlled the Temple Mount and part of the Lower City, including the Ophel and the Kidron Valley, and the other led by Simon bar Giora who controlled all of the "Upper City" where he made his place of residence in the Phasael tower before abandoning it, and part of the "Lower City" (Acra) as far as the great wall in the Kidron Valley and the fountain of Siloam. Eventually, when the Roman army took the Lower City (Acra), they set fire to all its houses. The palace of the Adiabene Queen Helena, the proselytess to Judaism, was formerly situated in the middle of Acra.

== Location ==
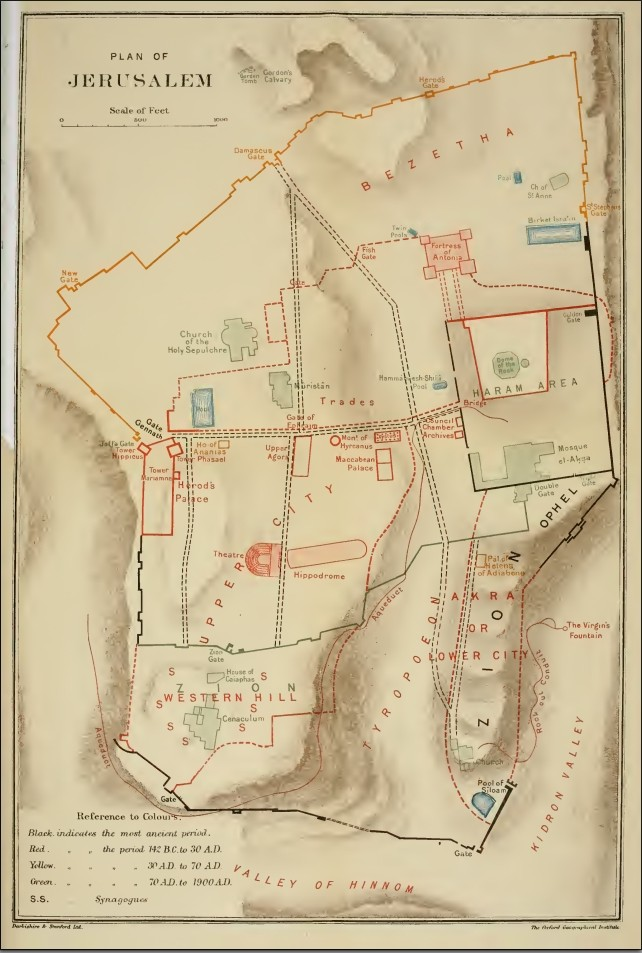
1903 map of Jerusalem, identifying the Acra with the entire south eastern hill.

The location of the original fortified structure known as Acra is important for understanding how events unfolded in Jerusalem during the struggle between Maccabean and Seleucid forces. This has been the subject of debate among modern scholars. Since the mid-1970s, the search has focused on three areas south of the presumed location of the Second Temple, now marked by the Dome of the Rock. These are, from north to south, the area later covered by the Herodian extension of the Temple esplanade; the Ophel; and the entire southeast hill known as the City of David, with a fortress at its northern end.

Complicating things is the fact that Josephus' Acra can be understood both as the name of a fortified structure and as that of a residential area in Jerusalem during his time, the late Second Temple period, named after the stronghold. This area he also calls the "Lower City", and corresponds today with parts of Silwan including the City of David and is distinct from "the Upper Market" (Hebrew: שוק העליון), also known as the "Upper City", as well as from the newer suburb known as Bezetha ("New City"). Josephus tells us that the area known as Acra (Ancient Greek: Ἄκρα) was built on a hill in the shape of a horned moon. The "Valley of the Cheesemakers" (the Tyropoeon) separated its hill from the adjacent area known to Josephus as the Upper City.

The most detailed ancient description of the nature and location of the Acra is found in Josephus' Antiquities of the Jews, where it is described as residing in the Lower City, upon a hill overlooking the Temple enclosure:

...and when he had overthrown the city walls, he built a citadel [Greek: Acra] in the lower part of the city, for the place was high, and overlooked the temple; on which account he fortified it with high walls and towers, and put into it a garrison of Macedonians. However, in that citadel dwelt the impious and wicked part of the multitude, from whom it proved that the citizens suffered many and sore calamities.

— Flavius Josephus, Antiquities of the Jews 12:252–253

The location of the "lower part of the city", elsewhere referred to as the "Lower City", at the time of Josephus (1st century CE) is accepted to be Jerusalem's south-eastern hill, the original urban center traditionally known as the City of David. Lying to the south of the Temple Mount, however, the area exposed today is significantly lower than the Mount itself. The top of the Mount is approximately 30 metres (98 ft) above the ground level at the southern retaining wall of the later Herodian-era expansion of the Temple enclosure. The elevation decreases to the south of this point. Josephus, a native of Jerusalem, would have been well aware of this discrepancy, yet is nevertheless able to explain it away by describing how Simon had razed both the Acra and the hill on which it had stood. Archaeological research south of the Temple Mount, however, has failed to locate any evidence for such large-scale quarrying. On the contrary, excavations in the region have uncovered substantial evidence of habitation from the beginning of the first millennium BCE down to Roman times, casting doubt on the suggestion that during Hellenistic times the area was significantly higher than it was at the time of Josephus or that a large hill had been cleared away. This had led many researchers to disregard Josephus' account and his placing of the Acra, and suggest several alternate locations. Since 1841, when Edward Robinson proposed the area near the Church of the Holy Sepulchre as the site of the Acra, at least nine different locations in and around the Old City of Jerusalem have been put forward.

=== South of the Temple ===
==== A fortified compound in the City of David ====
The available sources do indicate the Acra stood south of the temple, and because 1 Maccabees is a contemporaneous account of the Maccabean revolt, its account of the Acra (1:35–38) is considered the most reliable. Josephus provides an unlikely account of the razing of a hill on which the Acra had stood, yet his description of the end of the Great Revolt (70 CE) provides additional evidence for it being located south of the Temple Mount:

...but on the next day they set fire to the repository of the archives, to Acra, to the council-house, and to the place called Ophlas; at which time the fire proceeded as far as the palace of queen Helena, which was in the middle of Acra;

— Flavius Josephus, The Wars of the Jews 6:354

As the other buildings mentioned in the account all stood to the south in the Lower City, this also places the Acra there. This account attests to the persistence of the name "Acra" in this part of Jerusalem many years after Hellenistic rule ended and its citadels had been overthrown, and it can also be seen as referring not to a distinct building but rather to an entire region of the city. Indeed, several clauses in 1 Maccabees may be read as making a similar point:

About five hundred men of the army of Nicanor fell, and the rest fled into the city of David.

— 1 Maccabees 7:32.

And in his days things prospered in his hands, so that the Gentiles were put out of the country, as were also the men in the city of David in Jerusalem, who had built themselves a citadel [Greek: Acra] from which they used to sally forth and defile the environs of the sanctuary and do great damage to its purity.

— 1 Maccabees 14:36.

These suggest that, after the sacking of Jerusalem by Antiochus IV in 168 BCE, at least part of the City of David to the south of the Temple Mount was rebuilt as a fortified Hellenistic quarter of Jerusalem. More than a citadel, it was a Macedonian colony where Jewish renegades and supporters of the new regime lived. This is also supported by archaeological evidence, including Rhodian amphorae handles and 18 box graves found on the eastern slope of the City of David. The latter are dated to the early 2nd century CE, and are uncharacteristic of Second Temple era Jewish burial practices, yet similar to other known Hellenistic graveyards such as the one in Acre (Ptolemais).

==== A citadel associated to the compound ====
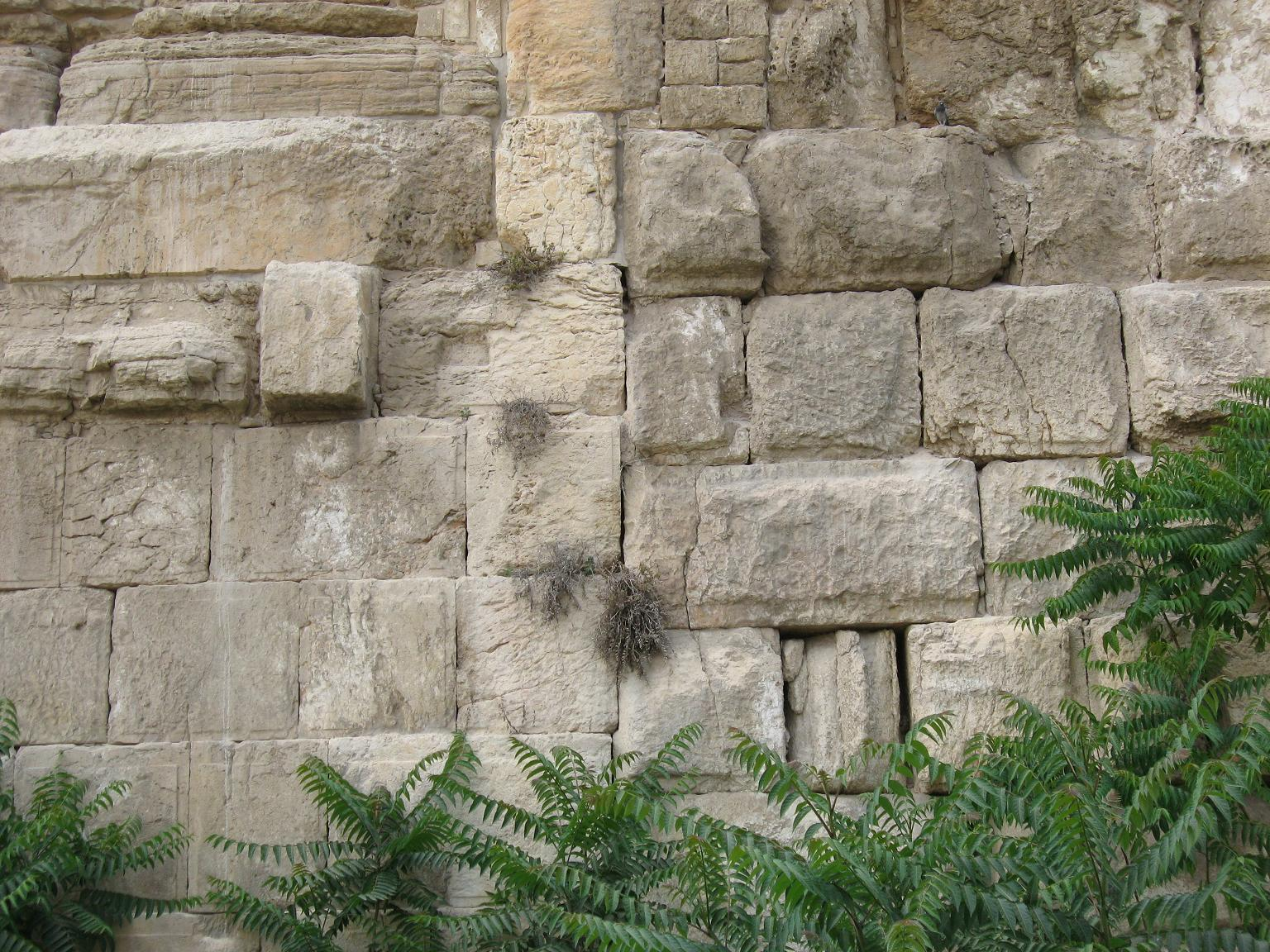
Seam along eastern wall of Temple Mount separating Hellenistic (right) from Herodian (left) construction

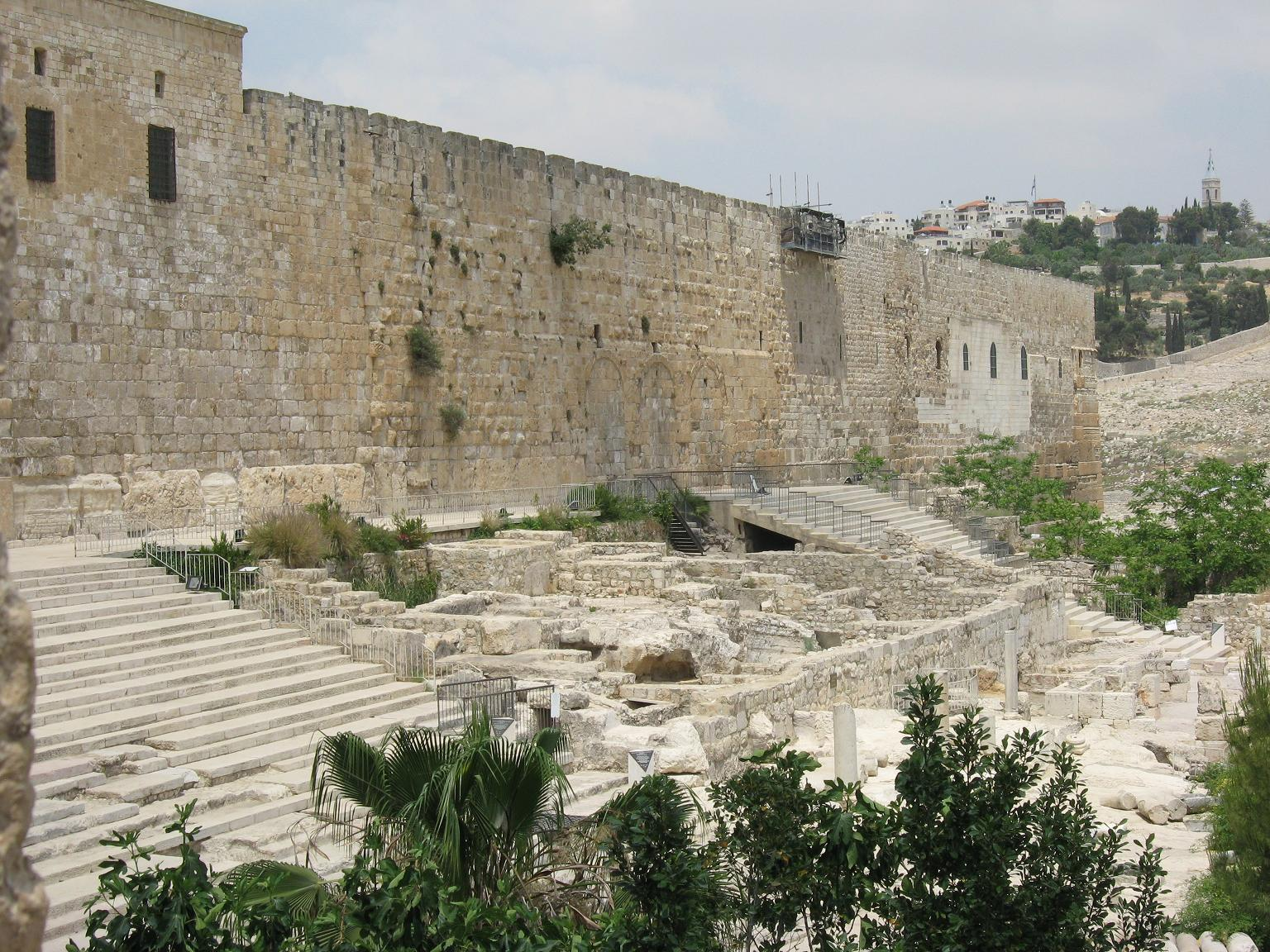
Southern wall of the Temple Mount and remains of a building excavated by Mazar and identified it as part of the Acra

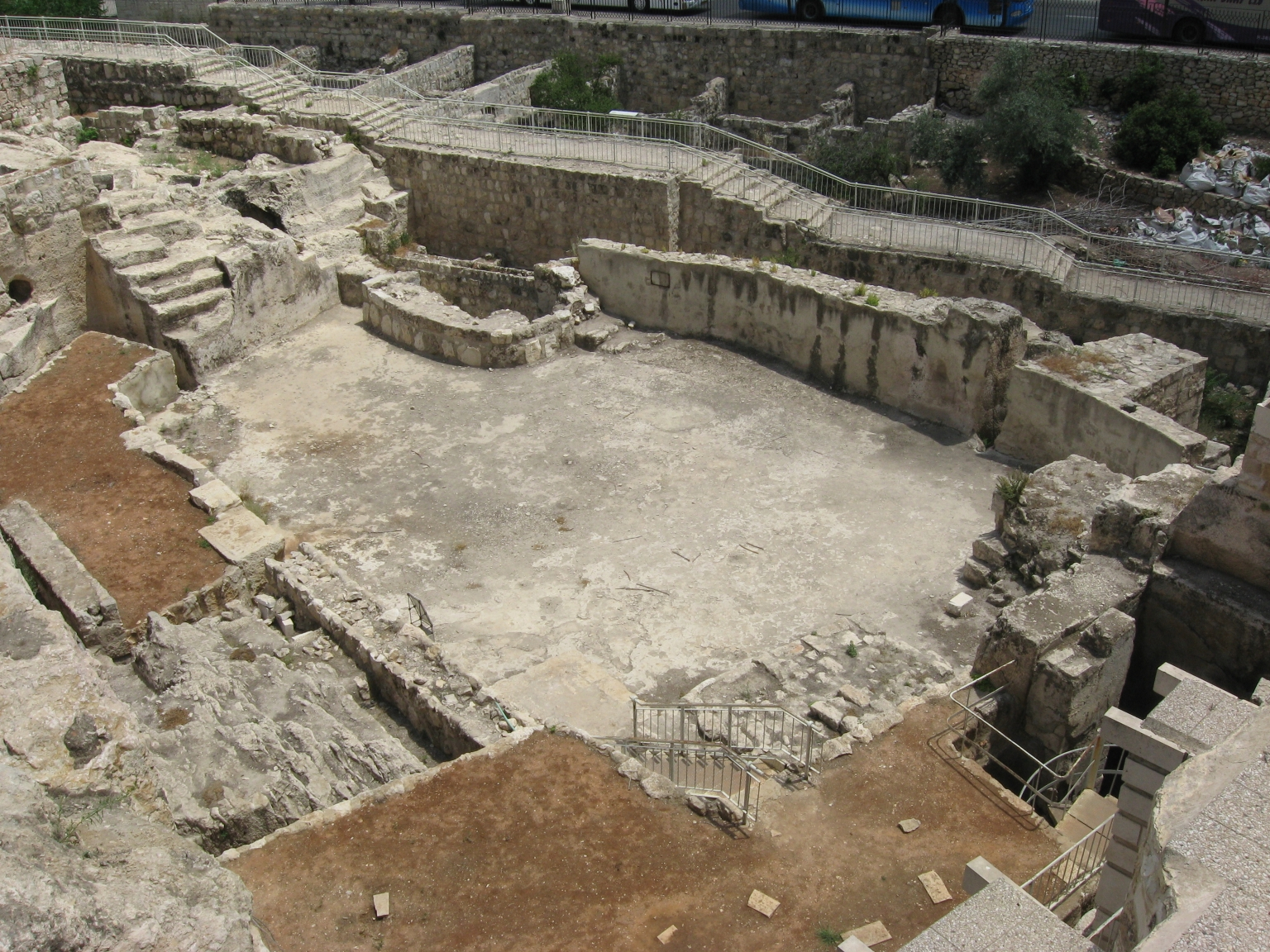
Ophel cistern, possible remnant of the Acra

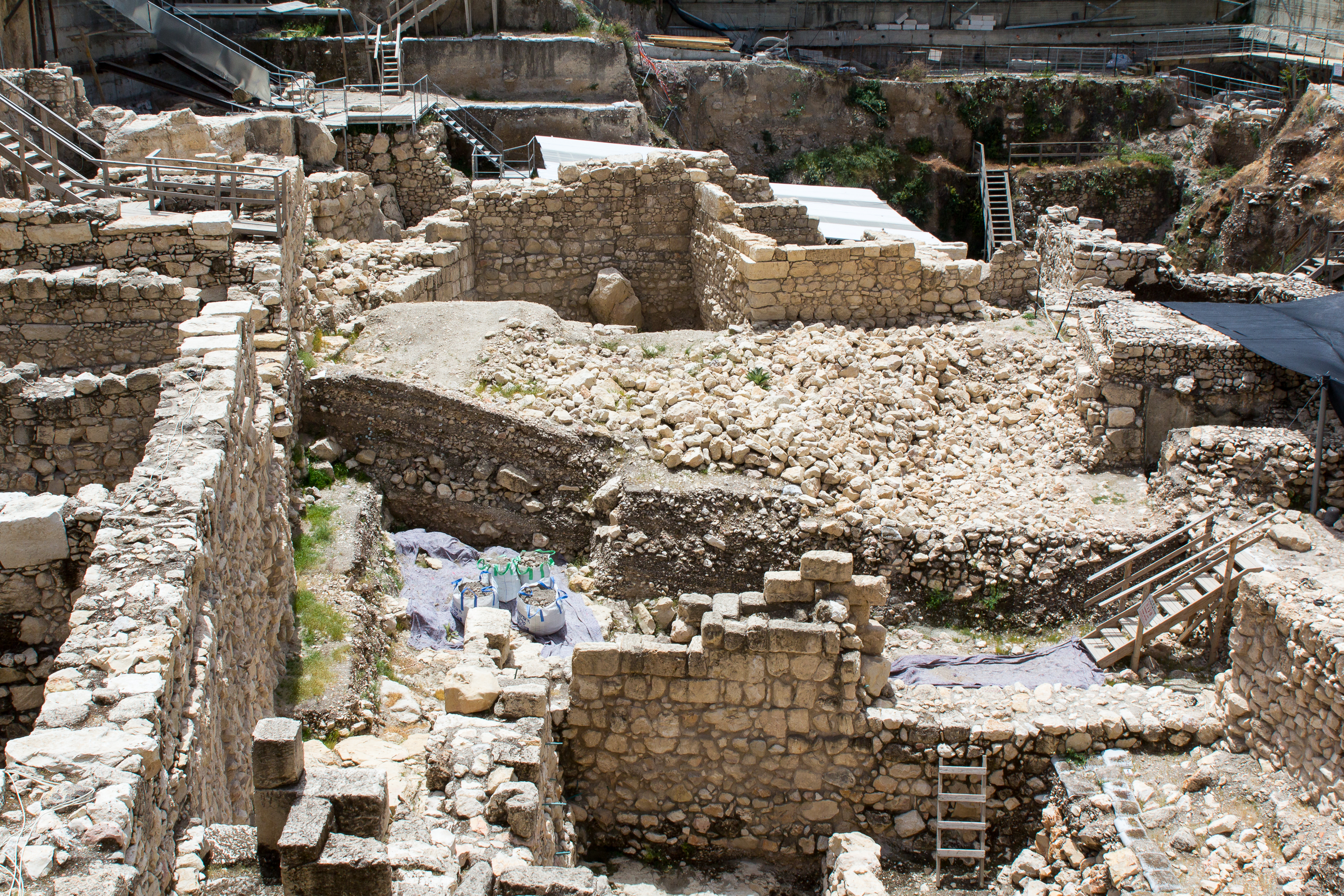
The glacis associated with the Acra unearthed in 2015 in the Givaty Parking Lot dig.

Even if the name "Acra" were applied to an entire Hellenistic quarter rather than to just a fortress, it is likely that a citadel would have stood within that compound to billet the Macedonian garrison which occupied it. It was normal for a Hellenistic city to have a fortified stronghold at or near the highest point of its walled area. Thus, whether a part of a larger enclave or independent of its surroundings, a citadel probably did stand at the northern tip of the City of David just south of the Temple Mount. Archaeologists have tried to use finds from excavations conducted in the area to pinpoint this citadel's precise location.

==== At the southeast corner of the Temple Mount ====
Yoram Tsafrir has attempted to place the Acra underneath the southeastern corner of the later, Herodian Temple Mount enclosure. Tsafrir points to a straight vertical seam in the enclosure's eastern masonry wall as evidence of different periods of construction. North of the seam is an early section of the wall built of large ashlar blocks. These blocks have faces with drafted margins around a prominent boss and are laid in homogeneous header and stretcher courses, one above the other. This style of construction is Hellenistic and distinct from the Herodian construction apparent south of the seam. Although the exact dating of this construction in uncertain, Tsafrir believes it is a remnant of the Acra's foundations which were later incorporated into Herod the Great's extension of the Temple platform. As further proof, Tzafrir also points to a significant similarity between construction methods evident north of the seam, including the use of trapezoid-shaped stones, with the methods employed in the Seleucid city of Perga in Asia Minor. 1 Maccabees 1:30 attributes construction of the Acra to Apollonius, Antiochus III's "chief collector" (Hebrew: שר-המיסים, Sar Hamissim), which appears to be an ancient mistranslation or his original title as chief (Hebrew: שר, Sar) of the Mysians, a people of Asia Minor.

Several cisterns under the Herodian Temple Mount extension have also been proposed as possible remnants of the Seleucid citadel. These include a 700,000-imperial-gallon (3,200,000 L; 840,000 US gal) cistern shaped like an E, the northern edge of which is adjacent to the proposed southern line of the Temple Mount precinct before its Herodian expansion. This has been identified as the "be'er haqar" or "bor heqer" mentioned in the Mishnah, Erubin Tract 10.14, and commonly translated, perhaps incorrectly, as the "cold well".

==== South of the Huldah Gates ====
Meir Ben-Dov believed that the Acra stood just south of the Huldah Gates of the southern wall of the Herodian Temple Mount platform. Benjamin Mazar's 1968 and 1978 excavations of the Ophel, the area adjoining the southern portion of the platform, have unearthed the foundations of a massive structure and a large cistern, both possibly dating to the Hellenistic period. These have been tentatively identified as remnants of the Acra, with the structure, featuring rows of small interconnected rooms, believed to be the remains of a barracks. These had been demolished and built over during the Hasmonean period, matching the descriptions in Josephus. The Hasmonean constructions were, in turn, flattened to create a public square fronting the main gates to the Temple platform during the Herodian renovations.

==== Givati parking lot dig ====
In November 2015 the Israel Antiquities Authority (IAA) announced the possible discovery of the ancient site for the Acra. While excavating the Givati parking lot south-west of the Temple Mount and north-west of the City of David, the archaeologists Doron Ben-Ami, Yana Tchekhanovets and Salome Cohen claimed that a complex of rooms and fortified walls they had unearthed was to be identified with the Acra mentioned in literary sources. This identification would, however, place it slightly south of previously suggested locations for the structure on the Ophel. Finds include fortification walls, a watchtower measuring 4 by 20 meters, and a glacis. Bronze arrowheads, lead sling-stones and ballista stones were unearthed at the site, stamped with a trident, the emblem of Antiochus IV Epiphanes. These are indicative of the military nature of the site and the efforts to take it. The excavation also yielded coins from the reigns of Antiochus IV through Antiochus VII, as well as a multitude of stamped Rhodian amphora handles.

The Givati location has been doubted by Leen Ritmeyer and other scholars due to its being too low on the hill to overlook the Temple Mount, as described in literary sources. Additionally, the archaeological data retrieved from the so-called fortification systems and glacis, including coins, pottery and weaponry do not align with the historical dating of the Seleucid Akra according to literary sources.

=== North of the Temple ===
The Acra was not the first Hellenistic stronghold in Jerusalem. Sources indicate that an earlier citadel, the Ptolemaic Baris, had also occupied a location overlooking the Temple's precincts. Although the exact location of the Baris is still debated, it is generally accepted to have stood north of the Temple Mount on the site later occupied by the Antonia Fortress. The Baris fell to Antiochus III at the turn of the 2nd century BCE and is absent from all accounts of the Maccabean Revolt. Despite the narratives which have the Acra constructed within a very short time-span, it was nevertheless formidable enough to weather long periods of siege. These factors, coupled with references in which the Baris was itself called an acra, have led some to suggest that the Baris and the Acra were in fact the same structure. Although both 1 Maccabees and Josephus seem to describe the Acra as a new construction, this may not have been the case. Antiquities of the Jews 12:253 may be translated to give the sense that the "impious or wicked" had "remained" rather than "dwelt" in the citadel, which could be taken to mean that the Acra had been standing before the revolt and that only the Macedonian garrison was new.

Koen Decoster proposes that Josephus wrote of "a citadel in the lower part of the city" to an audience that would have been familiar with the Jerusalem of the 1st century CE—a city that did feature two citadels: the Antonia Fortress and the Herodian palace. As Josephus' Roman Jerusalem had already expanded to the higher western hill, "a citadel in the lower city" could have referred to anything located east of the Tyropoeon Valley, including the Antonia which stood north of the Temple and did indeed rise above and dominate it. In his view, this is the place Josephus must have had in mind when he wrote of the Acra.

Opponents of a northern location counter that this site is not supported by the historical sources, and that this would place the Acra away from Jerusalem's population center. Unlike its predecessor and successor citadels, it was not meant as a defence against external threat, but rather to oversee the inhabited Jewish parts of the city, a role incompatible with a proposed northern location.

=== Western hill ===
Several researchers have attempted to place the Acra in the Upper City on Jerusalem's western hill, within the area currently occupied by the Old City's Jewish Quarter. These propositions seek to locate the Acra within Antiochia, the Hellenistic polis established in Jerusalem according to 2 Maccabees. This conjectural new city would have been hippodamic in plan and therefore would have required a flat expanse of land which only the western hill could have provided. Furthermore, the eastern edge of the hill is adjacent to the Temple Mount and higher in altitude—two characteristics attributed to the Seleucid citadel.

Opponents of this proposed location point out that there is very little archaeological or historical evidence supporting the establishment of a Hellenistic polis within Jerusalem, let alone sited on the western hill which appears to have been only sparsely populated during the Hellenistic period. Excavations in today's Jewish Quarter display evidence of habitation from the First Temple Period, as well as renewed Hasmonean and Herodian settlement, but scant evidence of Hellenistic occupation. Research into the dispersal of stamped Rhodian amphorae handles has revealed that over 95% of these handles found in Jerusalem were excavated from the City of David, indicating the city had not yet expanded to the western hill during Seleucid rule. Furthermore, the western hill is separated from the Temple Mount and the City of David by the steep Tyropoeon Valley—a distinct tactical disadvantage for any force that may have been required to intervene in events within the temple precincts or heavily populated eastern sectors of Jerusalem.

== Possibly related inscription ==
Additional evidence for the existence of the Acra may come from the chance discovery, published by Shimon Appelbaum, of a fragmentary Greek inscription in the Old City of Jerusalem. The inscription is a fragment from the top of a sandstone stele and contains what may be an oath taken by soldiers stationed in the Acra, although the reading of the name "Acra" in the text has been contested.
