= Virge =

Wooden rod, symbol of office

Traditional virge with brass ball and small cross on top

A virge or verge (from Latin virga) is a type of rod, made of wood.

== Etymology ==
Originally it was one or more branches (the French often use verges, the plural of its equivalent, as the normal word for a rod, the rarer singular verge rather indicates a switch) used as an instrument for corporal punishment, or as a riding crop. It later became a symbol of civil office, used in ceremonies of swearing fealty (from which the legal term tenant by the verge is derived). Further deriving from this use is the sense of a measurement, and so boundary or border, of land, or generally a margin of space.

== Modern practice ==
In modern times it is best known as a verger's wand, the ceremonial staff of the Anglican and Episcopal lay church officers known as vergers (or originally virger – the title derives from virge), who originally used it as a "weapon" to make way for the ecclesiastical procession (compare the Catholic Swiss Guard), and occasionally to chastise unruly choristers.
