= Givati Parking Lot dig =

East Jerusalem archaeological excavation

- Wadi Hilwa Square
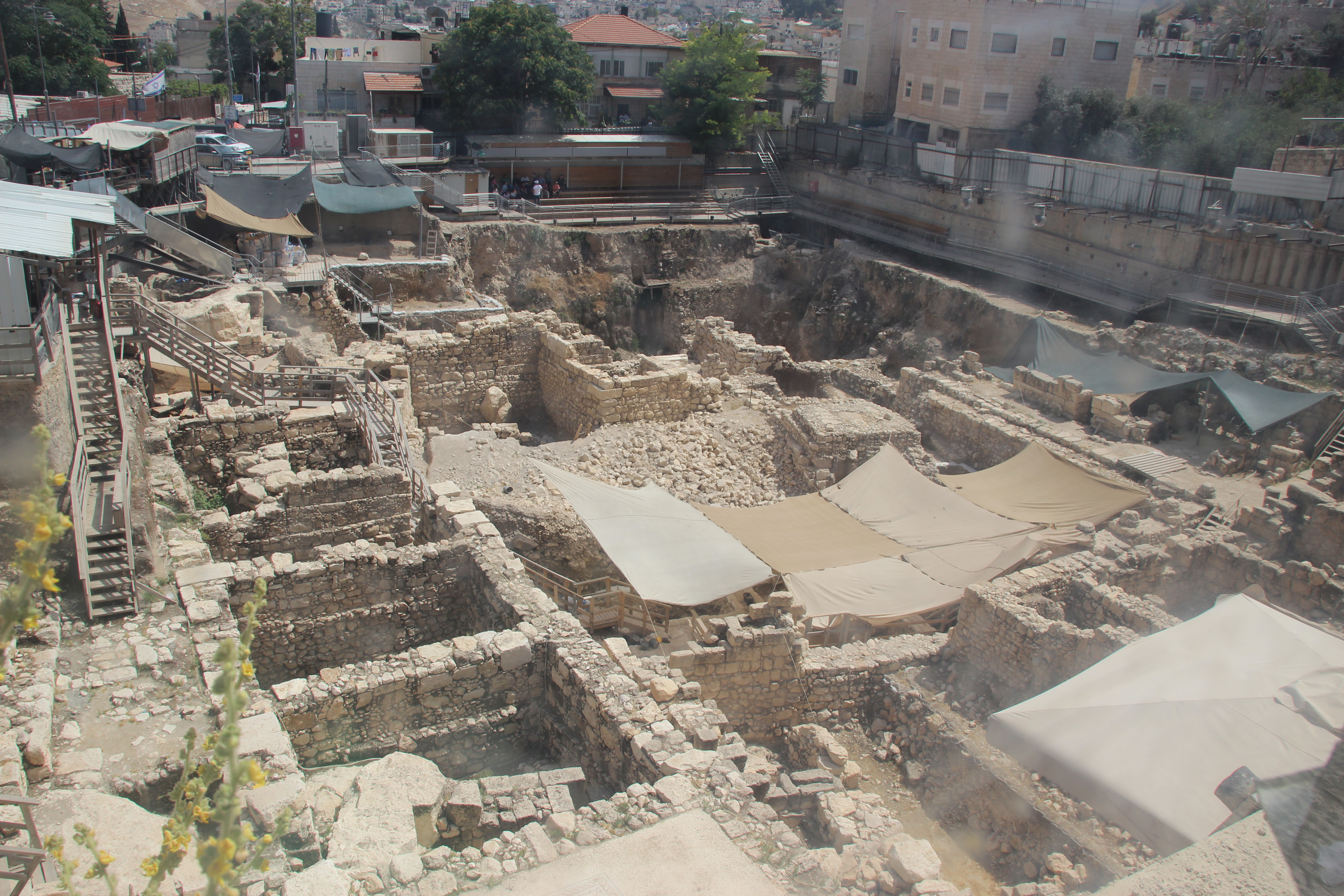
- Givati Parking Lot Excavations
- Interactive map of Givati Parking Lot dig
- 31.773056°N 35.236389°E
- Type: Archaeological excavation
- Location: Silwan, Jerusalem

History
- Built: Various periods, primarily Second Temple and Byzantine

Site notes
- Discovered: 2007
- Public access: with entry ticket from City of David

The Givati Parking Lot dig, also called Wadi Hilwa Square, is an archaeological excavation located in Silwan's Wadi Hilweh neighbourhood, in advance of a building project commissioned by the El'ad Association. It is adjacent to the City of David archaeological site. The dig was conducted by Doron Ben-Ami and Yana Tchekhanovets of the Israel Antiquities Authority and underwritten by El'ad. While the IAA conducts the excavations, the project and site are managed by El'ad.

== Location ==
In the 1970s, the Jerusalem Municipality expropriated land in Silwan in East Jerusalem under an urban renewal plan to create a parking lot for visitors. The site is located in Wadi Hilweh, a Palestinian neighbourhood of Silwan, and is close to the Western Wall. The area has undergone a process of Judaization with Hebrew names replacing Arabic names: Silwan was renamed Kfar Hashiloah and the Wadi Hilwa Square was renamed the Givati Parking Lot.

== History of the excavations ==
In the 1990s the El'ad Association began planning to build in the area of the City of David and purchasing land. The construction was initially opposed by the Israel Antiquities Authority to protect historical sites. El'ad continued to purchased land in the area and were given control over the Jerusalem Walls National Park; they proposed various construction projects on the site of the parking lot, and the proposal to establish a multi-storey visitor centre was approved by the IAA. Salvage excavations would need to be carried out in advance of planned construction to record any archaeological remains and the IAA stipulated that "archaeological finds will be integrated into the building".

El'ad "[pursues] an ideology of strengthening the Jewish hold in Palestinian neighborhoods in East Jerusalem", and the excavations at the parking lot have contributed to that aim. The parking lot was divided into four parks that would be totally excavated one after the other, and excavations on the site began in 2007. Among the 2007 discoveries is an ancient building believed to have been the palace of Queen Helena of Adiabene.

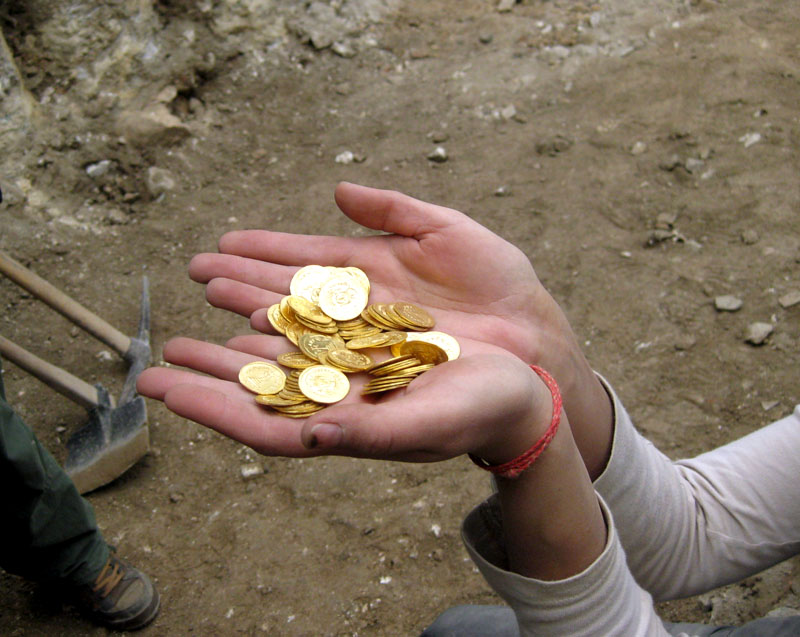
Part of a hoard, dated to the time of Byzantine emperor Heraclius

In 2008 medieval burials were found and removed by the developer and not recorded by the IAA. The same year, archaeologists uncovered a hoard of 264 gold coins minted at the beginning of the reign of Byzantine emperor Heraclius, between the years 610–613 CE, thus just before the Persian conquest of Jerusalem.

Residents of Silwan and non-governmental organization Peace Now objected to the proposed construction and petitioned to stop the work, though were ultimately unsuccessful. In 2010, the dig discovered a small, Roman-era cameo of Cupid made from onyx. The cupid is in a "striking" blue on a dark brown ground, he has wings and curly hair. The round cameo would have been an insert in a piece of jewelry. Cupid's left hand rests on an overturned torch, symbolizing death, so it was probably a mourning piece.

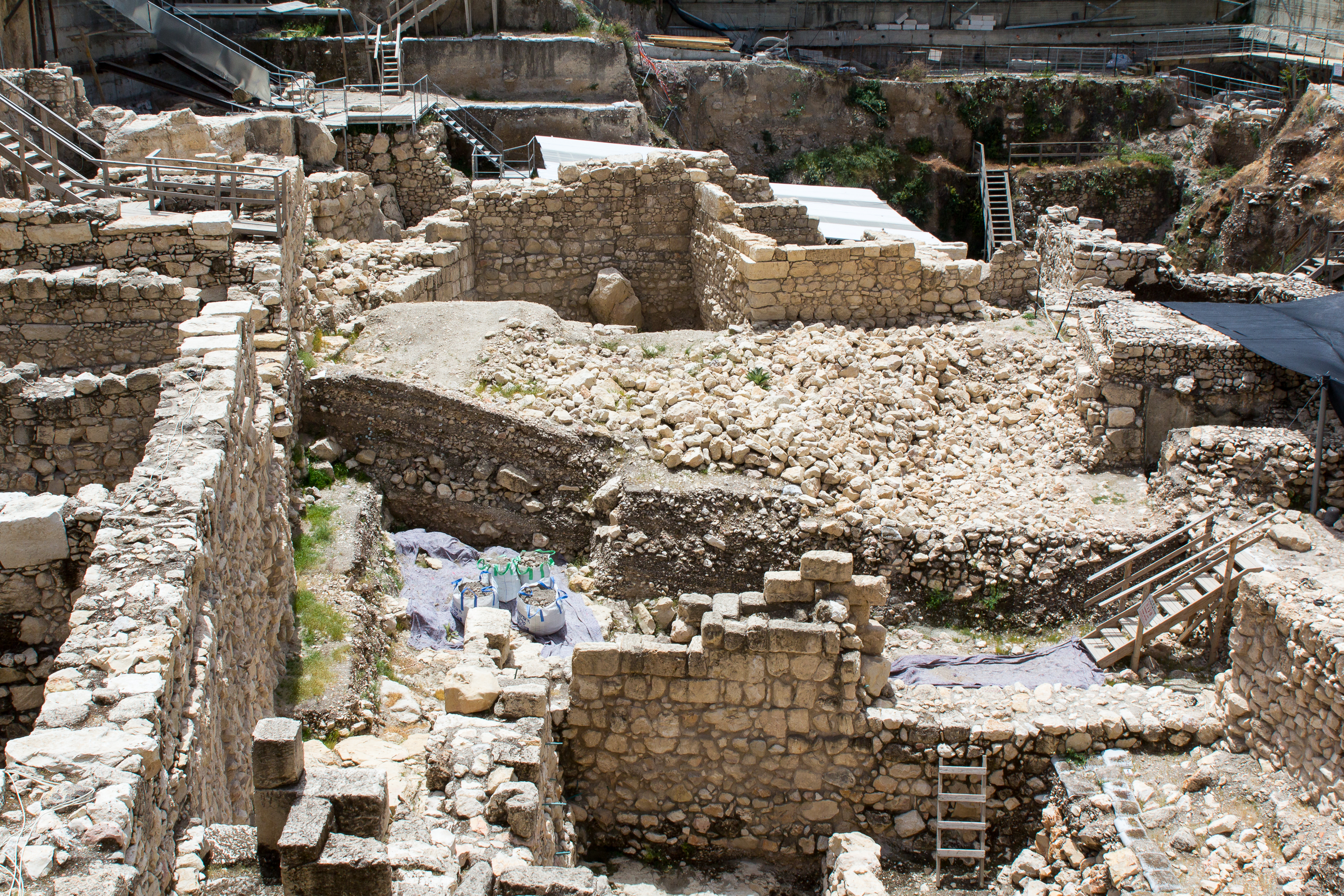
Glacis associated with the Acra, 2015

In November 2015, discovery of a tower and glacis identified as belonging to the Seleucid fortress known as the Acra was announced. According to archaeologists Doron Ben-Ami, Yana Tchekhanovets and Salome Dan Goor they had unearthed a complex of rooms and fortified walls they identified as the Acra. Finds include fortification walls, a watchtower measuring 4 by 20 meters, and a glacis. Bronze arrowheads, lead sling-stones and ballista stones were unearthed at the site, stamped with a trident characteristic to the reign of Antiochus IV Epiphanes. These are indicative of the military nature of the site and the efforts to take it. The finds included coins from the reigns of Antiochus Epiphanes through Antiochus VII Sidetes, as well as a multitude of stamped Rhodian amphora handles.

Analysis of fifteen leaf impressions on Late Hellenistic storage-jar sherds from the site identified the leaves as common fig (Ficus carica). Frumin and Tchekhanovets interpreted their position around repaired vessel rims as evidence that fresh leaves were deliberately used in patching jars before firing, and described the finds as the earliest archaeological evidence then known for fig trees in Jerusalem.

Archaeological architect Leen Ritmeyer disagrees with this identification. He claims the location and north–south orientation of the fortifications make them part of the defensive walls of what is known today as the City of David and described by Josephus as the Lower City. This Lower City was fortified by the Seleucids, who built the citadel known as Acra. In Greek, any fortification is called an acra. This is a common noun, not a proper one, thus some confusion as to which fortification each specific ancient description is referring to: the refortified City of David, which Ritmeyer identifies as Josephus' southern part of the Lower City, or the Acra proper, the entirely new fortress.

Ritmeyer argues (a) there were two distinct fortified structures in the Lower City and (b) the new citadel, the Acra, was higher than the Temple, which it overlooked. Given that the new finds from the Givati Parking Lot are some 200 metres away from the Temple Mount of the Hellenistic period, and at a much lower elevation than the Mount, they could not be part of the Acra that "overlooked the temple".

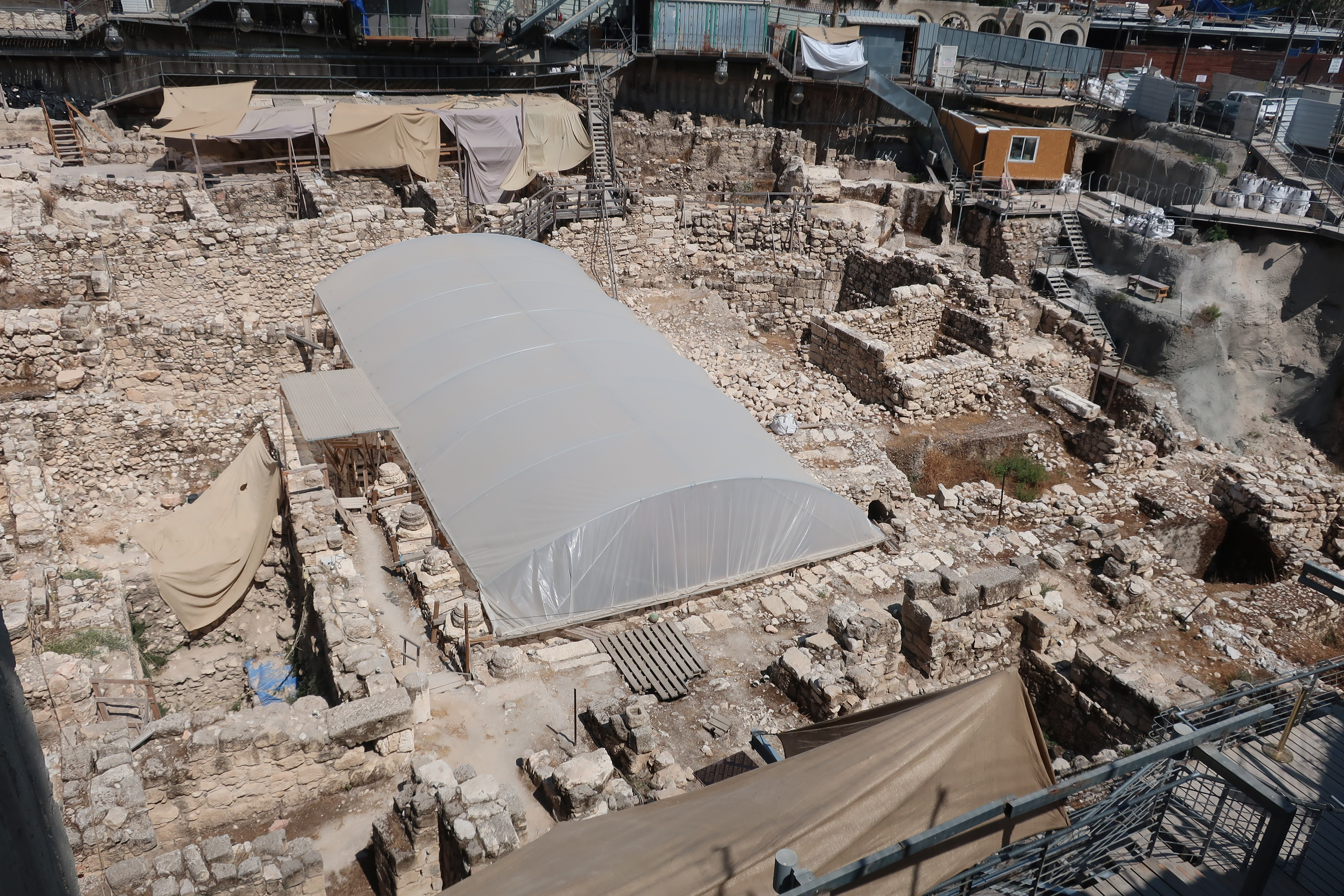
Excavated ruins at the former Givati Parking Lot in 2021

In 2019, a seal bearing the inscription "(belonging) to Nathan-Melech, Servant of the King" was discovered. The discoverers believe this seal probably refers to the official Nathan-melech mentioned in 2 Kings 23:11. In 2023, archaeologists discovered a manmade moat dating at the latest to the 9th century BCE that would have separated the northern end of the City of David from the Ophel. The discovery of the moat led to the re-evaluation of Kathleen Kenyon's excavations at Jerusalem decades earlier, suggesting that she had encountered a continuation of the moat and had interpreted it as a natural feature.

In July 2026, sycamore wooden beams were discovered during excavations conducted by Tel Aviv University and the Israel Antiquities Authority, believed by researchers to have served as the roof of an inner courtyard in a building burned during the destruction of the First Temple in 586 BCE.

== Impact ==
The excavations at the parking lot are part of a long-standing attempt to understand the Biblical history of the area. An investigation by Emek Shaveh found that the developers who intended to build on the site prioritised the preservation of layers relating to Jewish history. As a result, finds were removed and structures dismantled without adequate recording. This included a Muslim and possibly Jewish cemetery. Archaeologist Raphael Greenberg considered that this is a "serious breach of good archaeological practice, especially in view of the paucity of archaeological evidence concerning Jerusalem's population in the Fatimid or Mamluk periods and the possibility of investigating an ethnically mixed, Muslim and Jewish, population". El'ad's director, David Be'eri, was of the opinion that "It is necessary to present as much evidence linked to Biblical periods as possible".

Archaeologist Mahmoud Hawari contends that the Israeli-led excavations in Silwan contravene international law, as they are carried out in occupied territory.

== See also ==
- Excavations at the Temple Mount
- Monumental stepped street (1st century CE)
- Jerusalem Water Channel, running underneath the monumental stepped street
- Ophel Treasure, hidden right before the 614 Persian invasion, same as the Byzantine Givati hoard
- Silwan
