= Koster =

Koster may refer to:

== People ==
- Koster (surname), a common Dutch surname

== Places ==
- Koster Islands, two islands west of Sweden
- Koster, North West, a town in South Africa named after Bastiaan Koster, the original farm owner
- Koster Site, an archeological site in Illinois named after Theodore Koster, the original farm owner

== Other uses ==
- Koster (beer), a German beer
- HSwMS Koster (M73), a Swedish Koster-class mine countermeasures vessel
- Koster Commando, a light infantry regiment of the South African Army

== See also ==
- Coster (disambiguation)
- Köster
