= Kestner =

Kestner is a German surname. Notable people with the surname include:

- (Georg Christian) August Kestner (1777, Hanover - 1853), German antiquarian and diplomat
  - Kestner-Museum, Hanover, Germany, founded in 1889
  - kestnergesellschaft, an art gallery in Hanover, Germany, founded in 1916
- Boyd Kestner (born 1964), American actor
- Charlotte Kestner, née Buff (1753 - 1828), wife of Johann Christian Kestner
- Jens Kestner (born 1971), German politician
- Johann Christian Kestner (1741 - 1800), German jurist and archivist

== See also ==
- Costner, Kastner, Kästner/Kaestner, Kestner, Kostner, Köstner/Koestner
