= Coster (disambiguation) =

Coster is a surname.

Coster may also refer to:

- Coster or costermonger, a street seller of fruit and vegetables in Britain
- 10445 Coster, an asteroid

== See also ==
- Coster Diamonds, a diamond polishing factory in Amsterdam
- Costa (disambiguation)
- Koster (disambiguation)
