= Doron Ben-Ami =

Israeli archaeologist

- דורון בן עמי
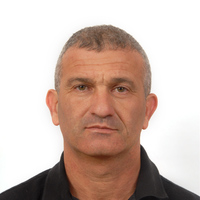
- Doron Ben-Ami in 2000
- Born: 1965 (age 60–61); Israel
- Education: Hebrew University of Jerusalem - Institute of Archaeology (PhD, AR. '03)
- Known for: Givati Parking Lot dig
- Scientific career
- Fields: Archaeology

Doron Ben-Ami (Hebrew: דורון בן עמי; born 1965) is an Israeli archaeologist. Ben-Ami earned his PhD at the Hebrew University of Jerusalem in 2003 where he was a member of the Institute of Archaeology as of 2009. He is the discoverer of the structure thought to be the palace of Queen Helena of Adiabene in the City of David, Jerusalem.

Since 2007, he has led the excavation in the Givati Parking Lot in the City of David, which is the largest, most comprehensive excavation in Jerusalem today, which has revealed important findings that contribute to understanding the history of the city.

== See also ==
- Acra (fortress)
- Givati Parking Lot dig
