= Pat Costner =

American environmentalist

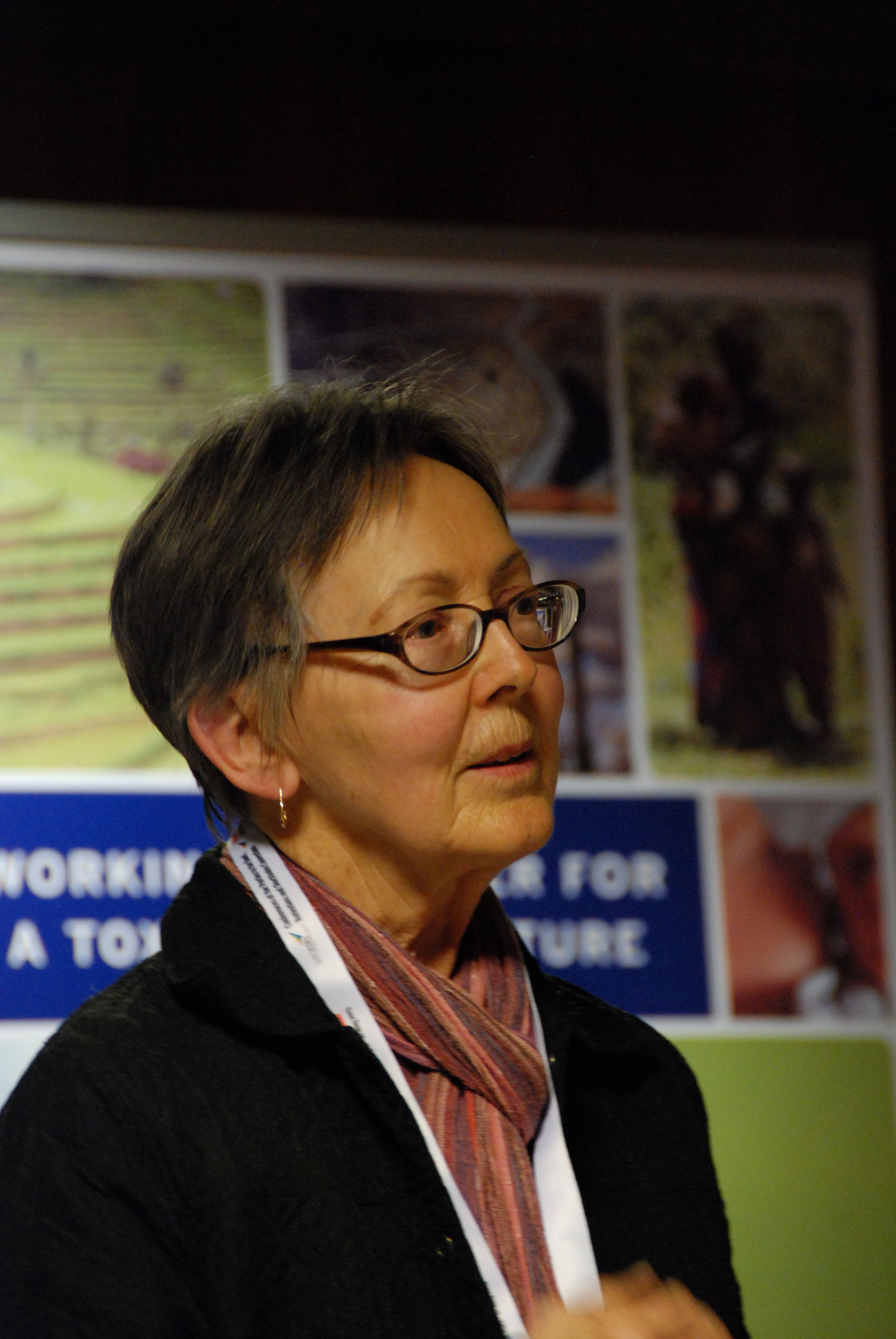
Pat Costner at IPEN side event in 2013, Geneva

Pat Costner (born 1 November 1940) is an American scientist and environmentalist. She is a founder and director of the group Save the Ozarks (StO). She worked for a long time as an advocacy scientist for Greenpeace and International Pollutants Elimination Network (IPEN).

== Life ==
Born in 1940, Pat Costner has lived in Eureka Springs, Arkansas, since the 1970s. In March 1991, arsonists set fire to her home in an incident later cited as an example of violence against environmental activists in The War Against the Greens, a study on the Wise Use movement and anti-environmental violence in the United States. Sheila O’Donnell, a private investigator hired by Greenpeace, described the event as “a professional hit,” implying it was targeted rather than random. Costner had lived in the house for over 20 years and raised her children there. She rebuilt her home after the fire and continued to reside there.

== Activity in civil society organizations ==
Costner's environmental advocacy began in 1986 with Greenpeace. Her early experience in the chemical industry, including roles at Shell Oil and Arapaho Chemicals, provided her with the technical expertise to critique harmful industry practices. As a senior scientist at Greenpeace, she became known for her investigations and reports on toxic contamination, especially concerning dioxins. In particular, Costner played a significant role in highlighting dioxin contamination in Mossville, Louisiana, a predominantly African American community. Her findings revealed dioxin levels in the environment and food sources that significantly exceeded safe limits, challenging official reports.

In addition to her work with Greenpeace, Costner actively engaged in policy discussions on environmental hazards. She presented research on persistent organic pollutants and dioxins at National Environmental Justice Advisory Council (NEJAC) hearings in 2000 and provided comments on the U.S. Environmental Protection Agency's dioxin reassessment. Her expertise extended to publishing influential works, including We All Live Downstream, which addresses water pollution and toxic waste issues; Playing with Fire, on hazardous waste incineration; and Incineration and Human Health, summarizing the health impacts of waste incineration.

After her career at Greenpeace, Costner founded Owltree Environmental Consulting, where she collaborated with IPEN on various environmental initiatives. In 2013, she founded Save the Ozarks (StO), originally a single-issue advocacy group opposing a proposed high-voltage transmission line by Southwestern Electric Power Company (SWEPCO) that would extend from Bentonville to a substation near the Kings River in Carroll County. Costner had previously supported local activists in their campaign against herbicide spraying along powerline corridors on public and private lands by Carroll Electric Cooperative in the Ozarks.

== International activities ==
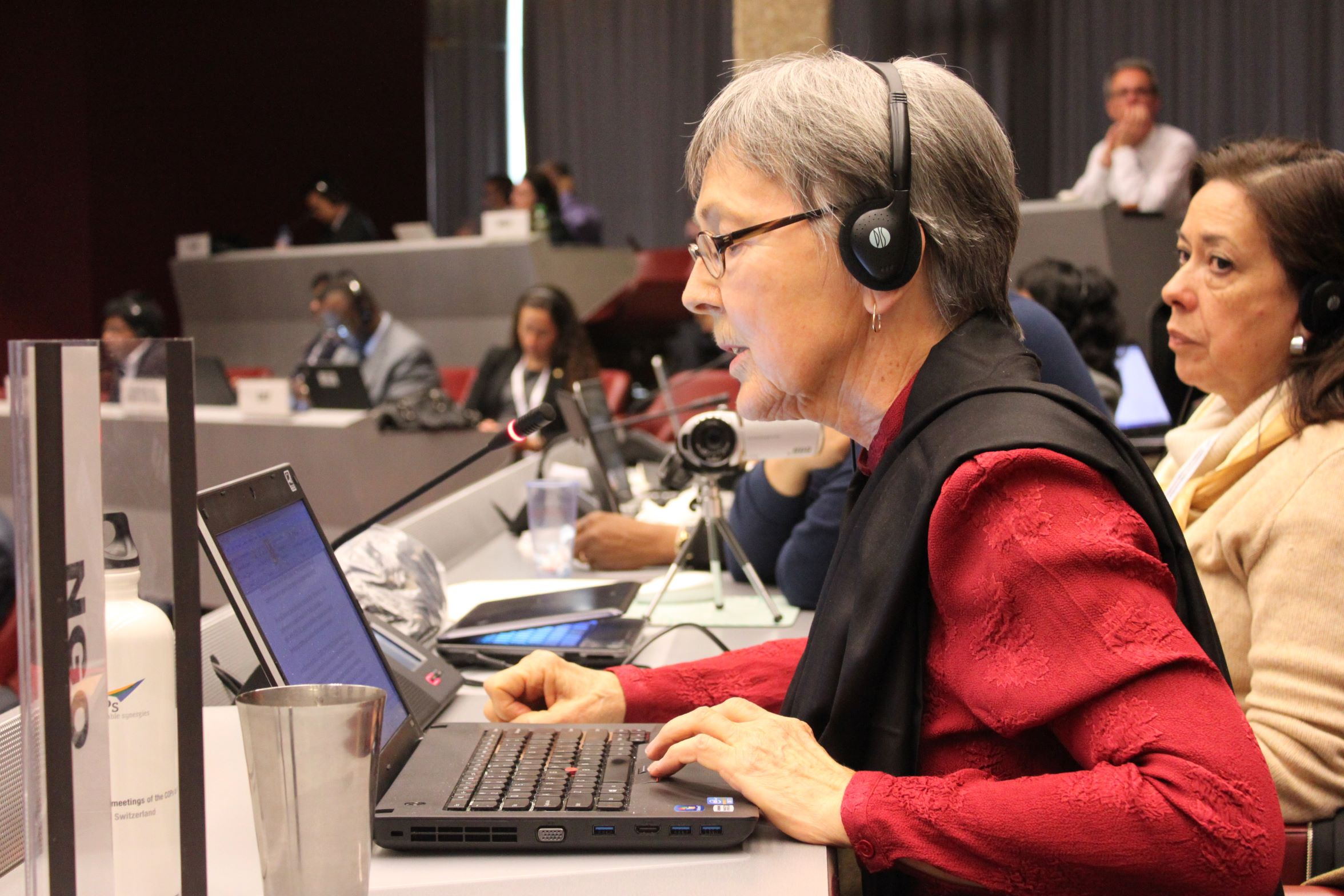
Pat Costner speaking for adoption of revised Dioxin Toolkit at COP6 of the Stockholm Convention. Photo: Shahriar Hossain.

In 1989, she criticized the plan to build an incinerator in Honduras near the rainforest at Gracias a Dios. In 2004, Costner lent her expertise to Czech environmental activists opposing a proposed waste incinerator in Lysá nad Labem. In 2005, she authored Estimating Releases and Prioritizing Sources in the Context of the Stockholm Convention, a study she presented at the 2007 Stockholm Convention (COP 2). This study significantly influenced the revision of dioxin emission factors, especially from open burning sources, which were previously overestimated compared to industrial sources such as waste incineration.

Between 2006 and 2013, Costner represented IPEN in discussions on the Dioxin Toolkit, a resource under the Stockholm Convention for estimating dioxin emissions. Her contributions helped shape the new Dioxin Toolkit, adopted at COP 6 of the Stockholm Convention. Her work in this area has led one journalist to describe her as “a key player in the development of the Stockholm Convention on POPs.”
