= Koester =

Koester is a surname. Notable people with the surname include:

- Bev Koester (1926–1998), Canadian naval officer and civil servant
- Bob Koester (1932–2021), American music producer
- Charles Roman Koester (1915–1997), American Catholic bishop
- Hans von Koester (1844–1928), German admiral
- Helmut Koester (born 1926), American theologian
- Jolene Koester, president of California State University, Northridge

== See also ==
- Koester, Missouri
- Köster
