= Ophel Treasure =

Old collection of gold coins

Ophel treasure
- Type: Treasure hoard
- Material: Gold
- Symbols: Menorah, Shofar, Torah
- Discovered: 2013; Jerusalem, at the foot of the Temple Mount
- Discovered by: Eilat Mazar
- Present location: Israel Museum, Jerusalem
- Culture: Byzantine

The Ophel treasure is a 1,400-year-old collection of 36 gold coins and a large gold medallion discovered in 2013 on the foot of Jerusalem's Temple Mount by archeologist Eilat Mazar. The medallion is engraved with Jewish symbols like a seven-branched menorah, a shofar and a Torah scroll.

== Dating ==
Mazar dated her findings to the Persian conquest of Jerusalem in 614 CE.

After the Persians conquered Jerusalem, many Jews returned to the city and formed the majority of its population. According to Lior Sandberg, numismatics specialist at the Institute of Archaeology, "the 36 gold coins can be dated to the reigns of different Byzantine emperors, ranging from the middle of the fourth century CE to the early seventh century CE...The cache was abandoned most probably after the Persian conquest of Jerusalem and after the Persians changed their attitude to the Jews and allowed their expulsion from the city. The fact that the gold was not properly hidden nor taken back attests to the tragic circumstances that led to its abandonment."

== Significance ==
The menorah, a candelabrum with seven branches, is the national symbol of the state of Israel and one of the oldest symbols of the Jewish faith. Mazar said: "We have been making significant finds from the First Temple Period in this area, a much earlier time in Jerusalem’s history, so discovering a golden seven-branched Menorah from the seventh century CE at the foot of the Temple Mount was a complete surprise." Israeli Prime Minister Benjamin Netanyahu called the treasure "a magnificent discovery." He also said, "It attests to the ancient Jewish presence and to the sanctity of this place...This is historic testimony, of the highest order, to the Jewish people's link to Jerusalem, to its land and to its heritage."

The Ophel Treasure can now be seen on exhibition in the Israel Museum in Jerusalem.

== See also ==
- Archaeology of Israel
- Cities of the Ancient Near East
- Givati Parking Lot dig, immediately southwest of the Ophel, where a gold hoard was found which was also hidden right before the 614 Persian invasion
