= Maurice De Coster =

Belgian footballer (1890–?)

Personal information
- Date of birth: 20 April 1890

International career
Years	Team	Apps	(Gls)
1913–1914	Belgium	5	(0)

Maurice De Coster (born 20 April 1890, date of death unknown) was a Belgian footballer. He played in five matches for the Belgium national football team from 1913 to 1914.
