= Köster =

Köster is a German surname. Notable people with the surname include:

- Adolf Köster (1883–1930), German politician and diplomat
- Bärbel Köster (1957–2025), German canoe sprinter
- Bettina Köster (1959–2026), German singer, songwriter, musician and composer
- Franz Köster (f. 1940s), German Luftwaffe pilot during World War II
- Fritz Köster (1855–1934), German trade unionist
- Gaby Köster (born 1961), German actress
- Johann Adolf Köster (c.1550–1630), German pastor and educator
- Maartje Köster (born 1975), Dutch cricketer

== See also ==
- Koester
- Koster (surname)
