= Daniel Kastner =

Austrian association football player

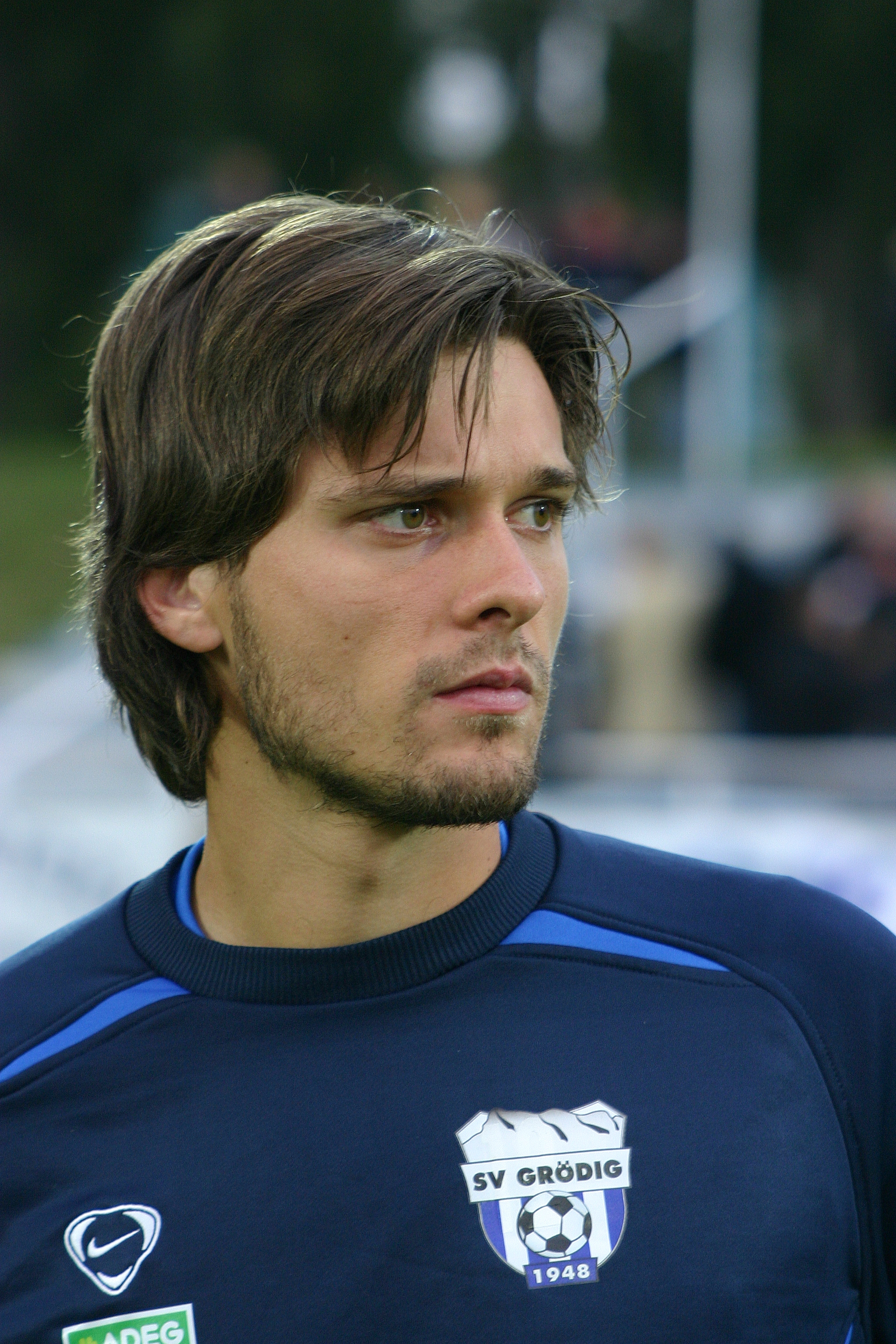

Personal information
- Date of birth: 3 November 1981 (age 44)
- Place of birth: Austria
- Position: Forward

Senior career*
Years	Team	Apps	(Gls)
–2001	FC Braunau	4	(0)
2001–2002	LASK	0	(0)
2002–2004	FC Puch		
2004–2005	FC Red Bull Salzburg	22	(4)
2005–2007	SV Ried	31	(5)
2007	SK Schwadorf	5+	(1+)
2008	SV Grödig	6	(0)
2009–2010	FK Liepāja		
2010–2012	Union Mondsee		
2012–2013	FC Miesbach	26	(7)
- * Club domestic league appearances and goals

Daniel Kastner (born 3 November 1981) is an Austrian retired footballer who last played for FC Miesbach in Germany.

== Career ==
Kastner started his senior career with Braunau. In 2004, he signed for Red Bull Salzburg in the Austrian Football Bundesliga, where he made twenty-two league appearances and scored four goals. After that, he played for SV Ried, SK Schwadorf, SV Grödig, FK Liepāja, Union Mondsee and Miesbach.
