= Koen Decoster =

Belgian historian, philosopher and translator

Koen Decoster is a Belgian historian, philosopher and translator. He has published works such as Flavius Josephus and the Seleucid Acra in Jerusalem (1989). and Beyond Conflict and Reduction: Between Philosophy, Science and Religion (2001) with William Desmond and John Steffen.
