= List of religious sites =

This article provides an incomplete list and broad overview of significant religious sites and places of spiritual importance throughout the world. Sites are listed alphabetically by religion.

== Abrahamic religions ==
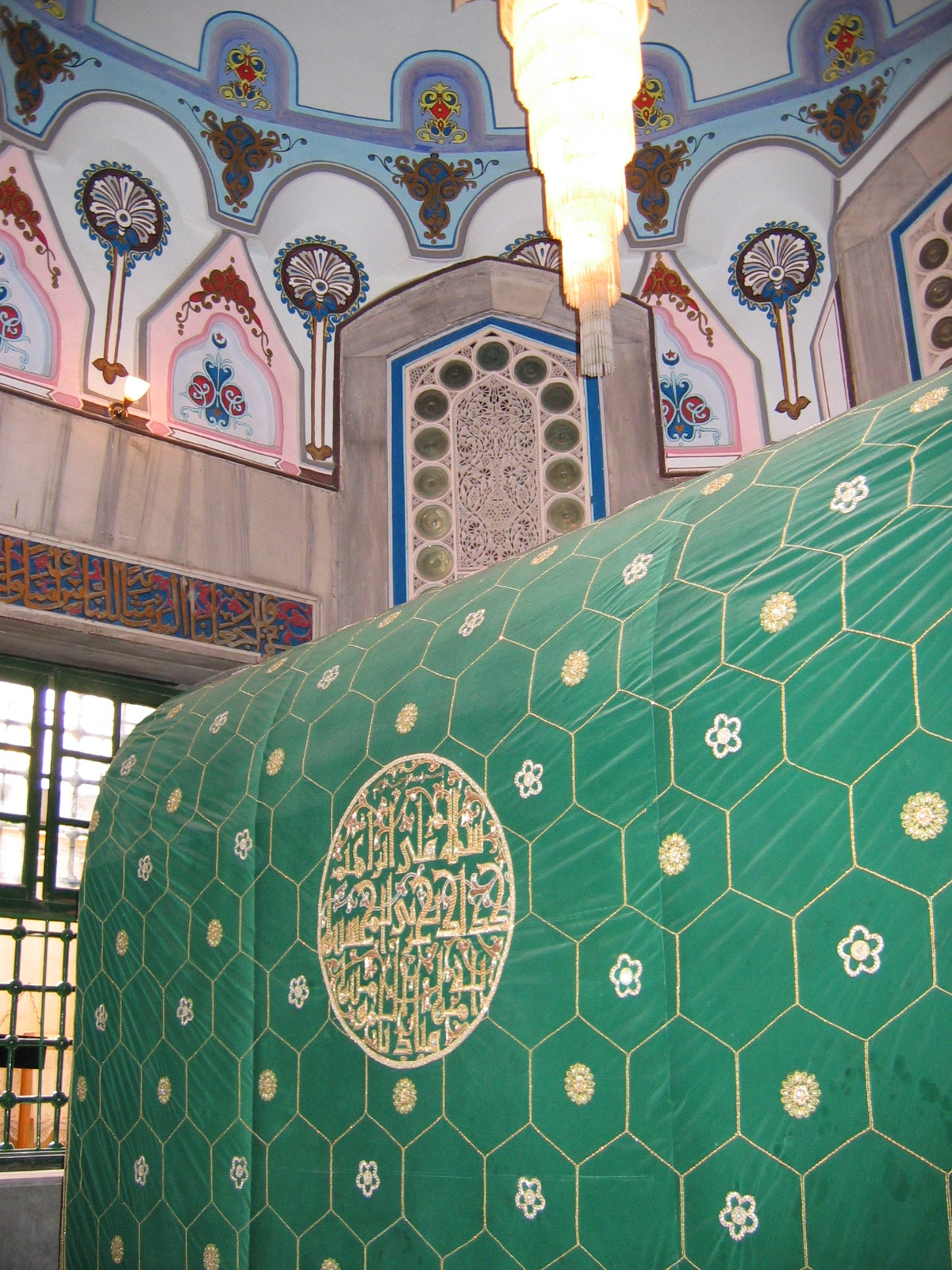
The tomb of Abraham in 2006

Abrahamic religions are monotheistic faiths emphasizing and tracing their common origin to Abraham or recognizing a spiritual tradition identified with him. They constitute one of three major divisions in comparative religion, along with Indian religions (Dharmic) and East Asian religions (Taoic).

The three major Abrahamic faiths (in chronological order) are Judaism, Christianity and Islam. Some strict definitions of what constitutes an Abrahamic religion include only these three faiths. However, there are many other religions incorporating Abrahamic doctrine, theology, genealogy and history into their own belief systems.

=== Baháʼí Faith and Bábism ===
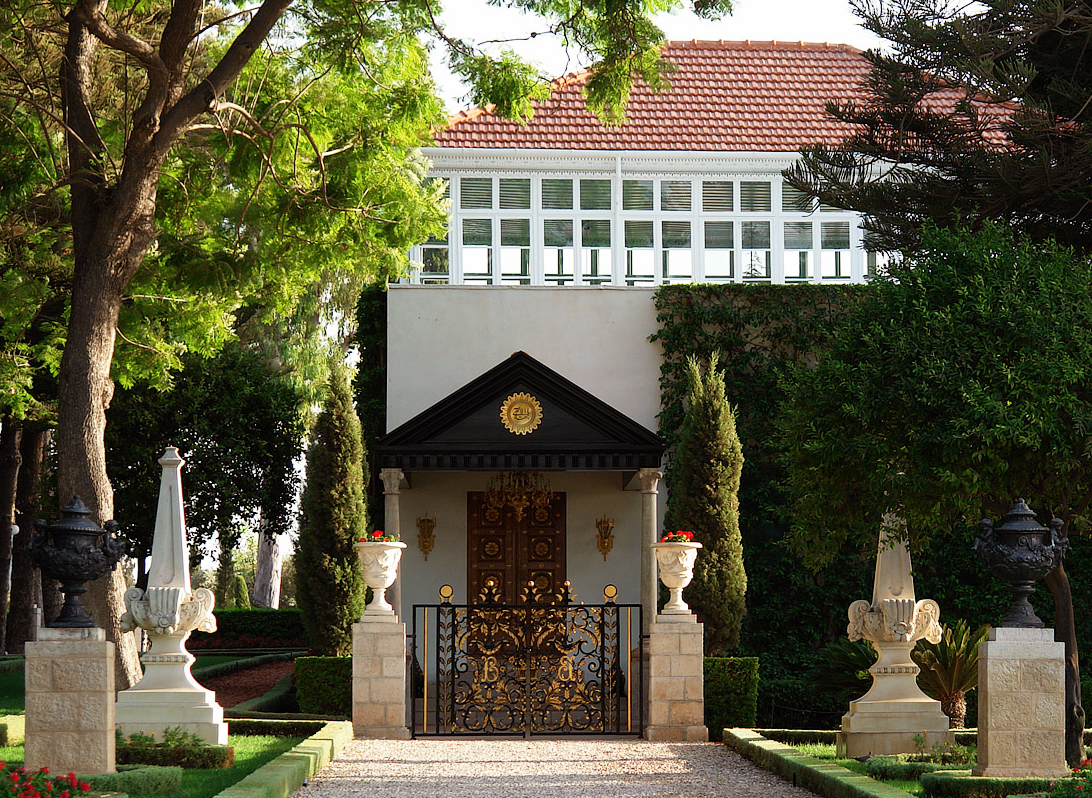
The Shrine of Bahá'u'lláh at Bahjí, Israel

The Baháʼí Faith is a monotheistic religion founded by Baháʼu'lláh in 19th century Persia, and consider their religion to progress from or succeed Bábism or the Bábi Faith (Persian: بابی ها Bábí há) founded by the Báb earlier in the century – emphasizing the spiritual unity of all humankind.

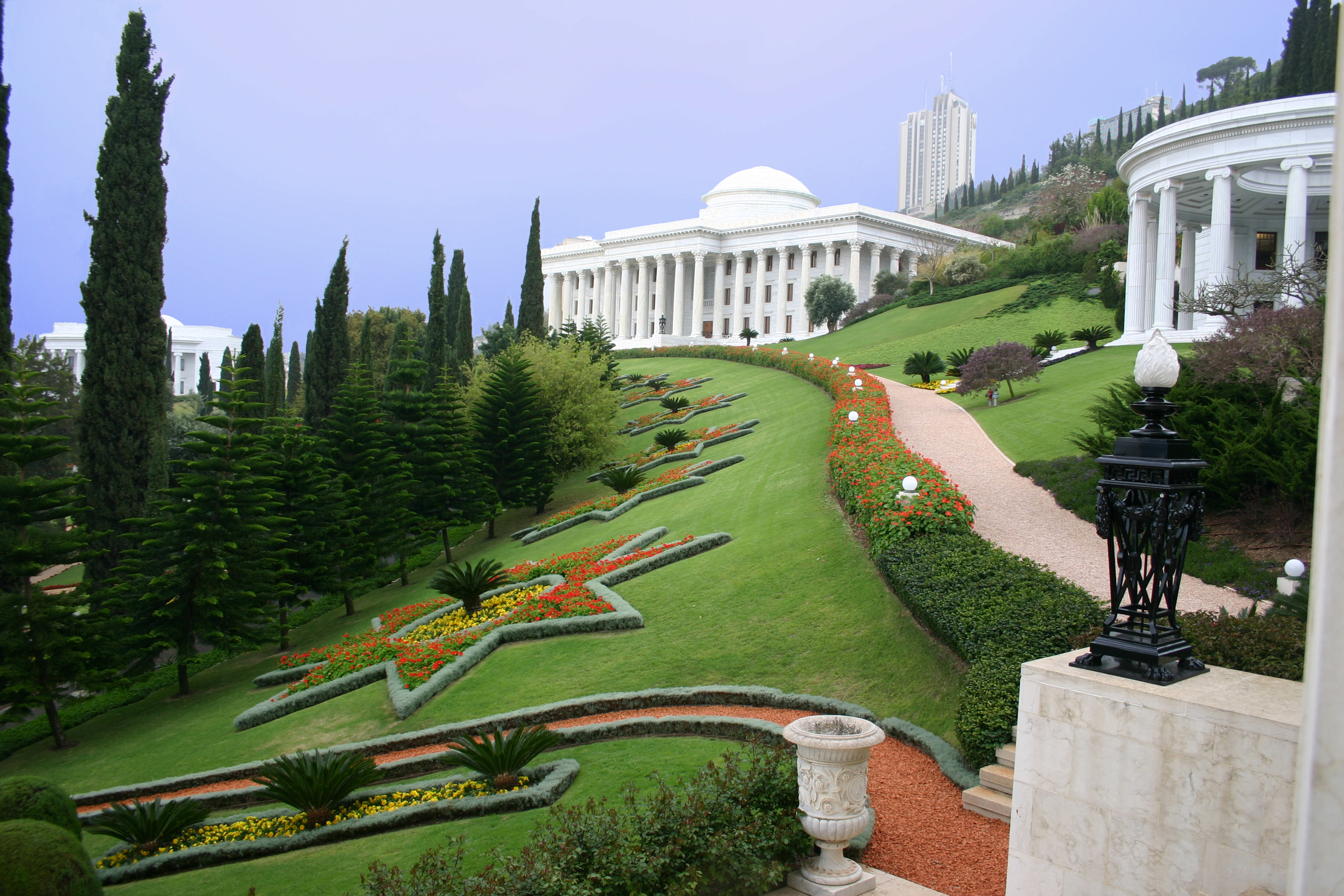
The Arc gardens and administrative buildings at the Baháʼí World Center on Mount Carmel, Haifa

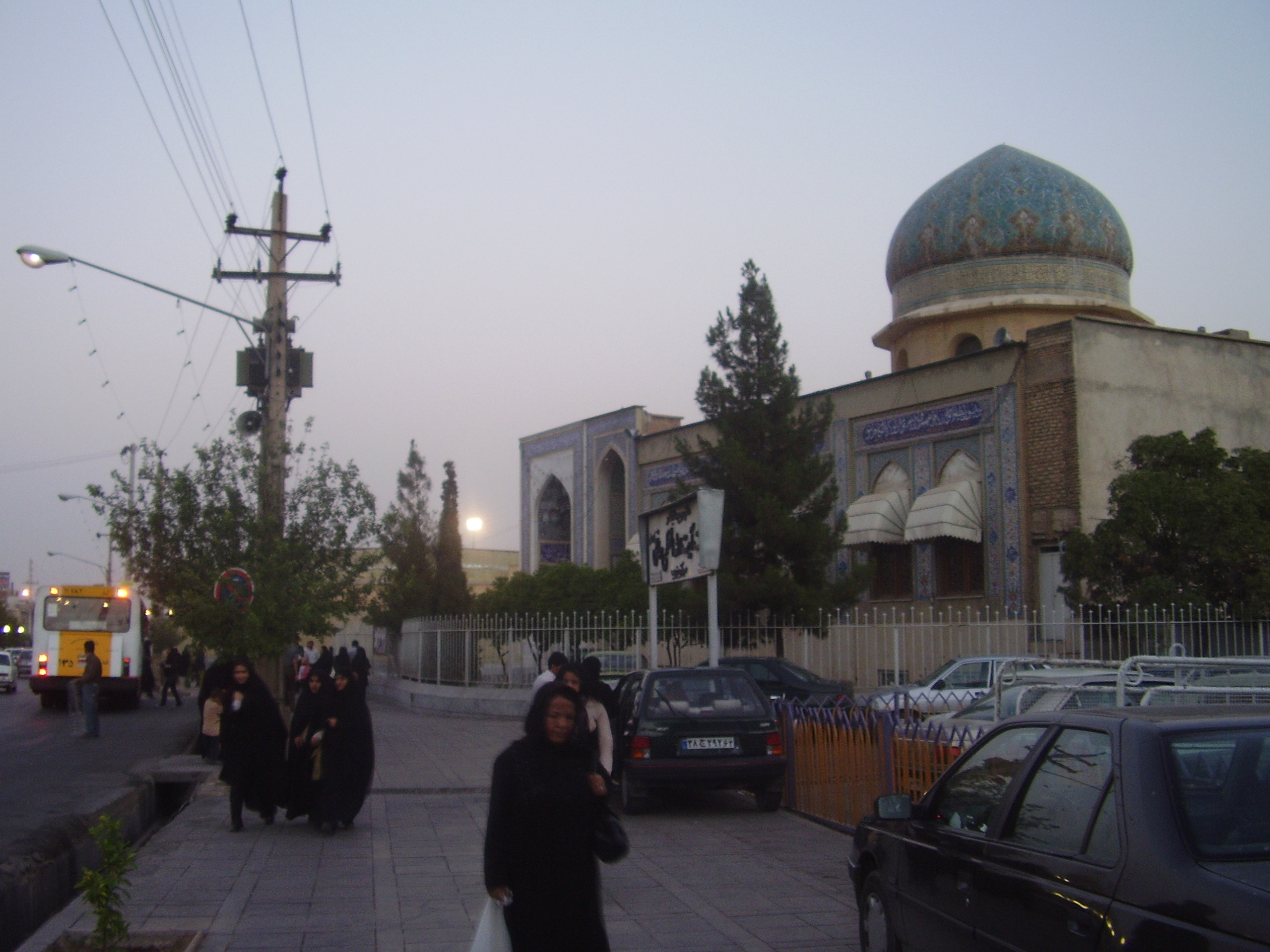
A telephone pole, sidewalk and mosque built over the House of the Báb in Shiraz, Iran, in 2008

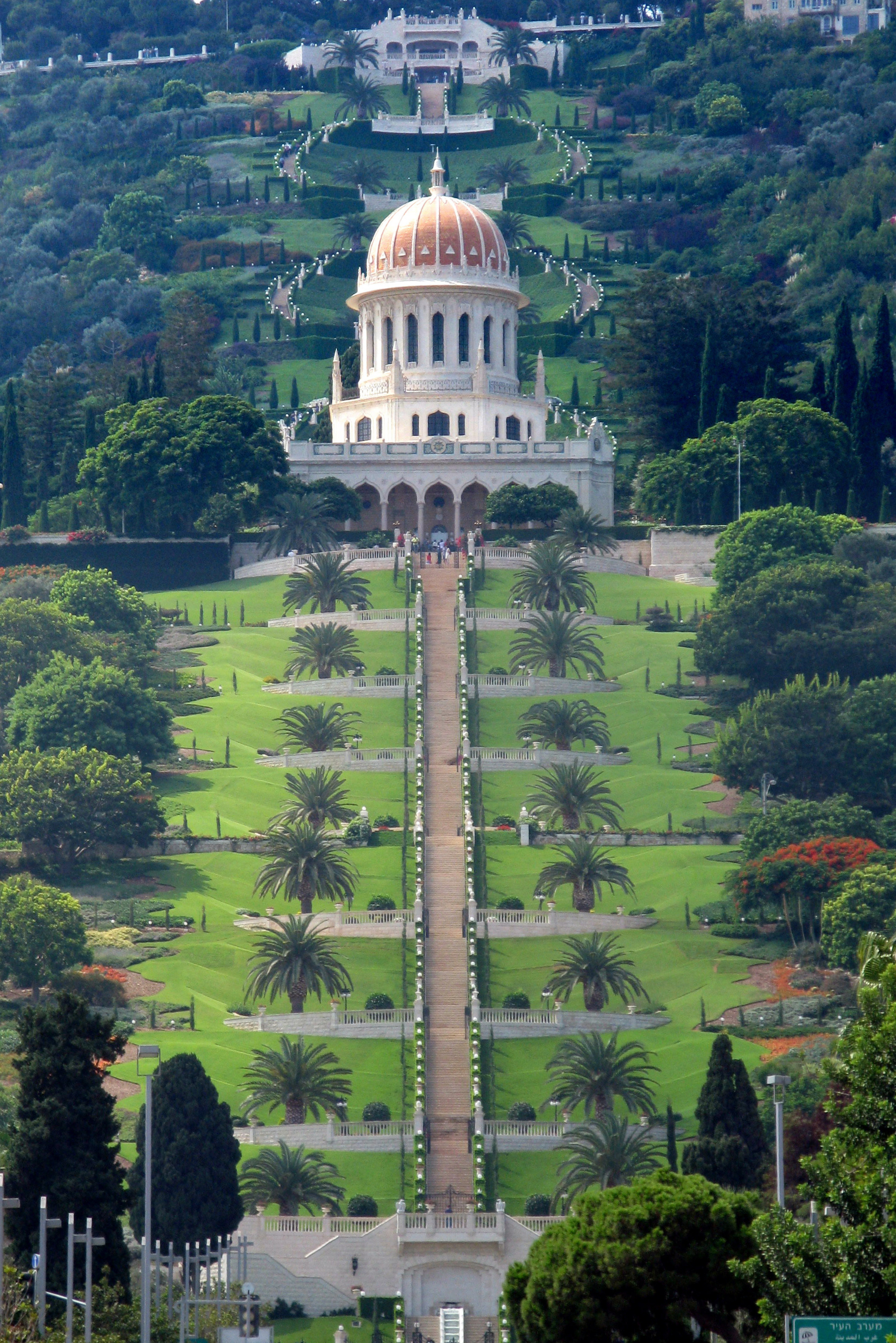
The terraced Baháʼí gardens, with the Shrine of the Báb in the background

Located in Bahji, near Acre, Israel the Shrine of Baháʼu'lláh is the most holy place for Baháʼís and their Qiblih, or direction of prayer. It contains the remains of Bahá'u'lláh and is near the spot where he died in the Mansion of Bahji. Baháʼís regard Acre (He.: עַכּוֹ Akko; Ar.: عكّا ʻAkkā) itself as their holy city, mostly due to the fact that it serves as the location of Bahá'u'lláh and his family's many affairs. Within Acre, Baháʼí sites include the House of 'Abbúd, the House of 'Abdu'lláh Páshá, the Garden of Ridván and the Prison cell of Bahá'u'lláh – where Bahá'u'lláh was incarcerated.

The second holiest site in the Baháʼí Faith – which is also revered by the few remaining Azalis (post-Baháʼí–Azali split followers of Bábism, who number just several thousand worldwide) – is the Shrine of the Báb, located on Mount Carmel in Haifa, Israel. The Báb's Shrine contains within its walls the temporary Shrine of ʻAbdu'l-Bahá.

The BWC also contains the Monument Gardens – wherein can be found the graves of some of Bahá'u'lláh's family – as well as a house in which 'Abdu'l-Bahá lived, and the resting place of Rúhíyyih Khánum (8 August 1910 – 19 January 2000; born Mary Sutherland Maxwell; the wife of Shoghi Effendi).

Bahá'u'lláh decreed pilgrimage in the Kitáb-i-Aqdas to two places: the House of Bahá'u'lláh in Baghdad, Iraq and the House of the Báb in Shiraz, Iran. While these major pilgrimages were later replaced (at least in terms of religious significance) by 'Abdu'l-Bahá, many Baháʼís still flocked to Bahá'u'lláh's home for pilgrimage until the house was confiscated by Muslim authorities hostile to the Baháʼí Faith in 1922. It has yet to be returned to the Baháʼí community. The House of the Báb was completely destroyed by Iranian Muslims during a state-sponsored persecution of Baháʼís. A road and mosque were built over the house and a telephone pole now marks the spot where the Báb proclaimed his prophethood. The city of Baghdad also includes the Garden of Ridván, which shares the same name as – though is distinct from – the Garden of Ridván in Acre.

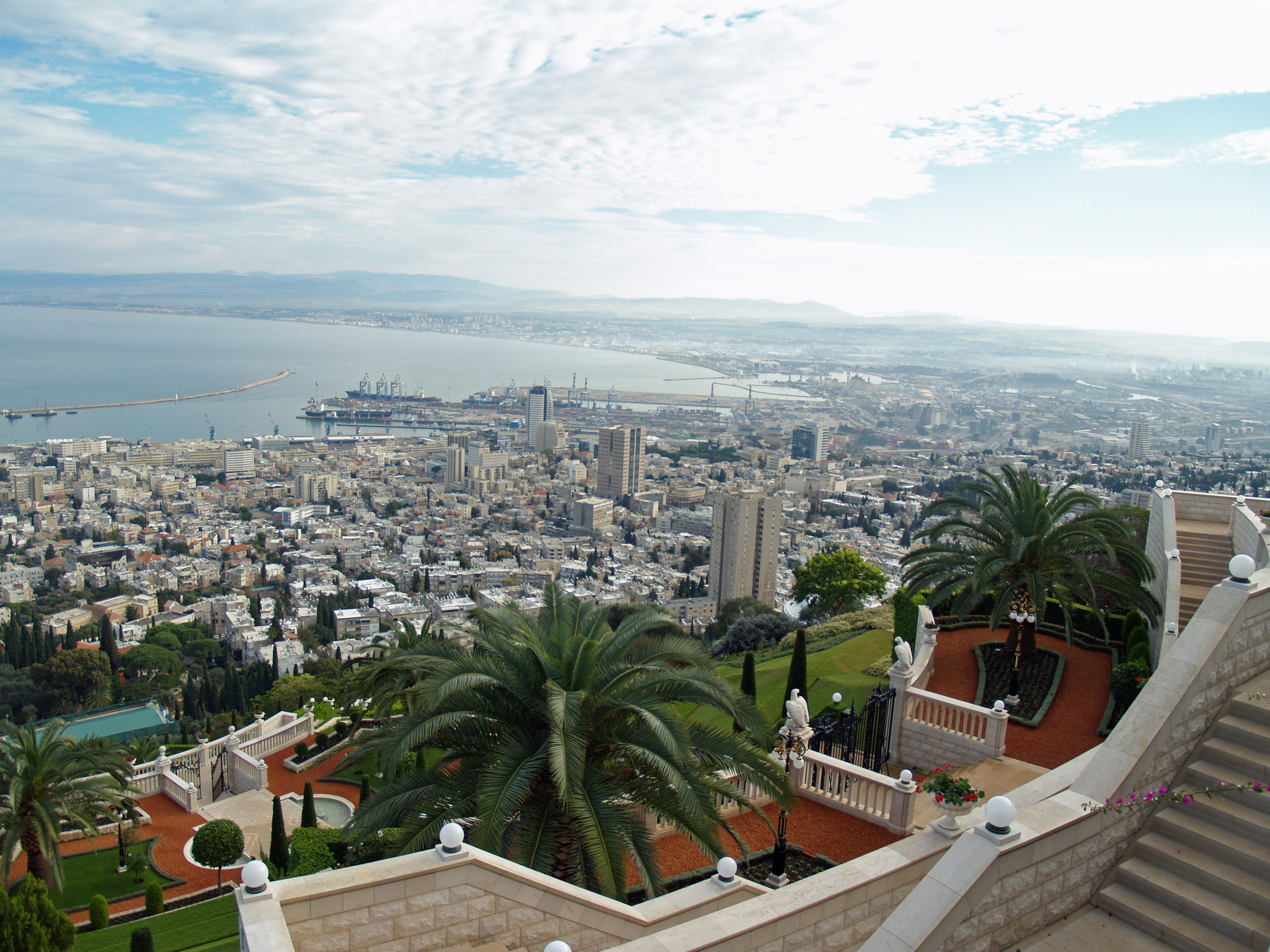
The city of Haifa from the Baháʼí gardens

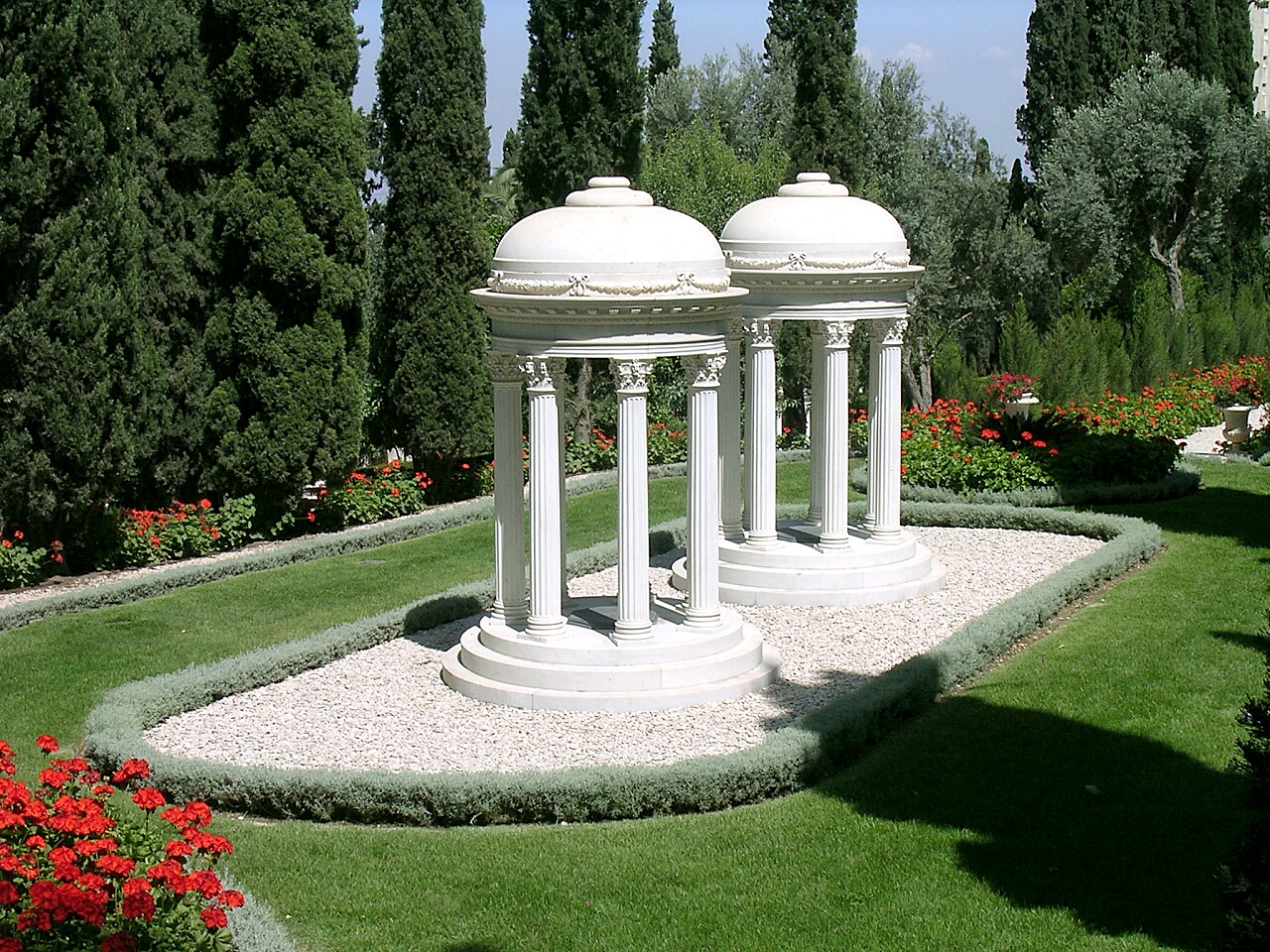
The twin graves of Ásíyih Khánum (Bahá'u'lláh's wife) and Mírzá Mihdí (his youngest son) in the Monument Gardens on Mount Carmel

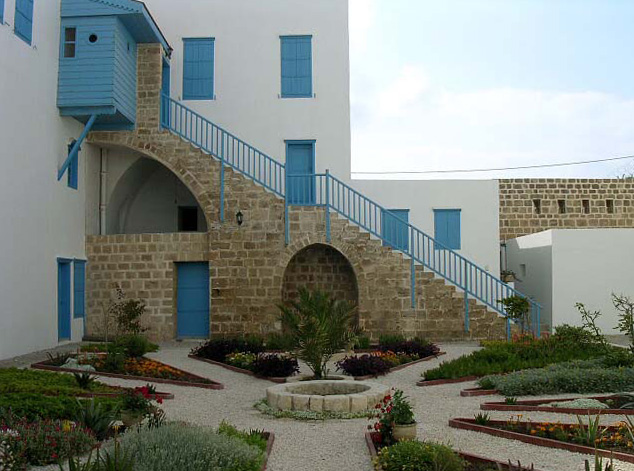
The House of `Abdu'lláh Páshá in Acre

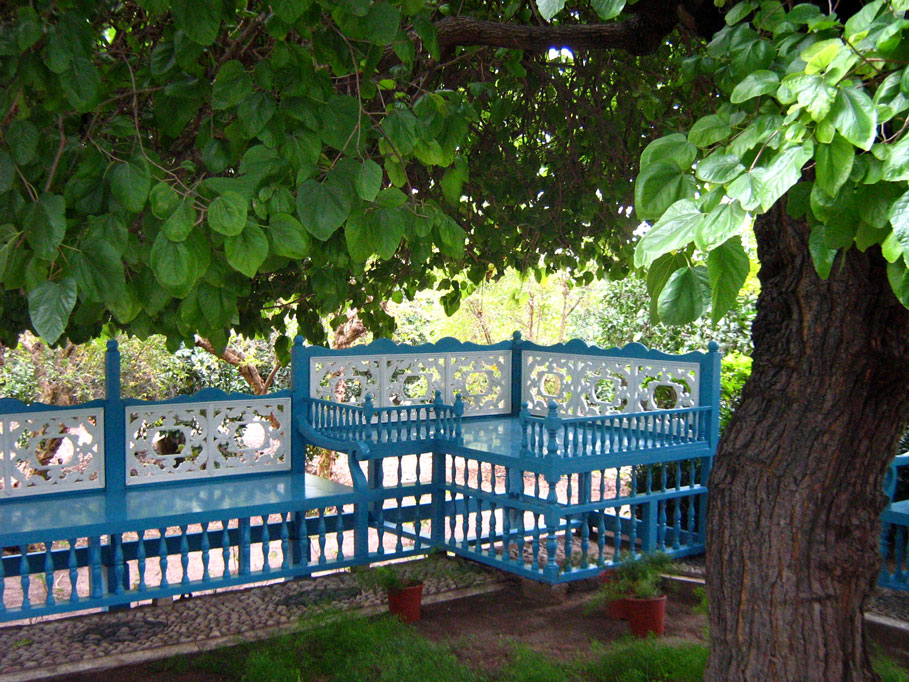
Part of the Garden of Ridván in Acre

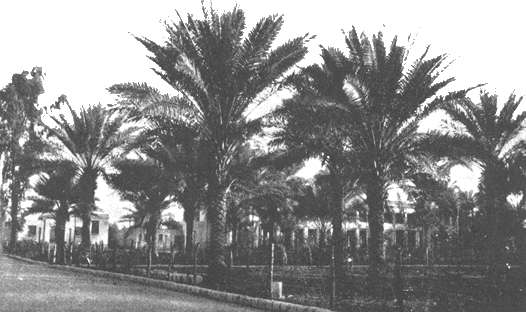
The Garden of Ridván in Baghdad, Iraq, where Bahá'u'lláh declared his mission in April 1863

=== Christianity ===
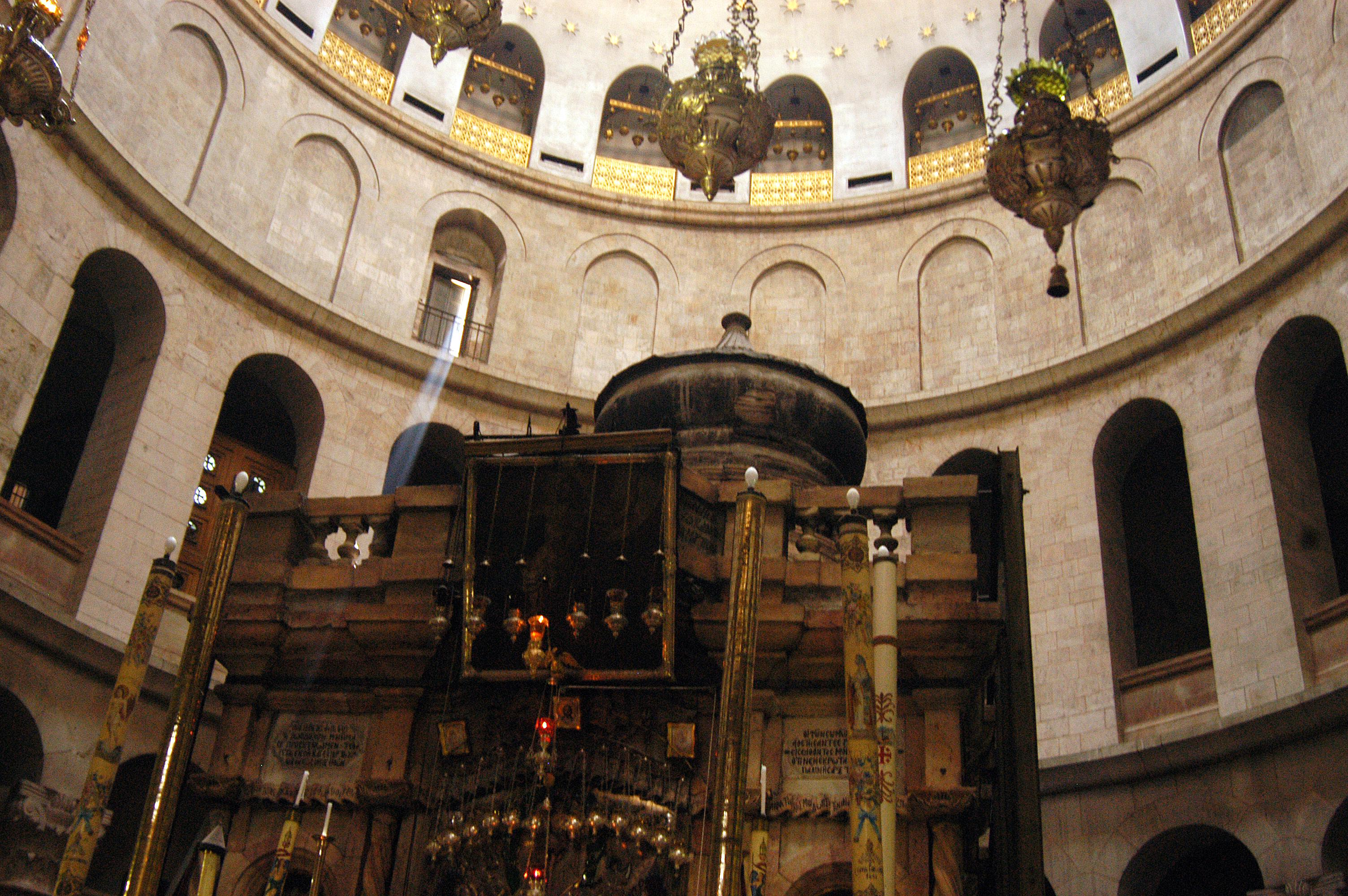
The Edicule of the Holy Sepulchre (The Tomb of Christ) in the Christian Quarter of Jerusalem in 2005, with the dome of the rotunda visible above

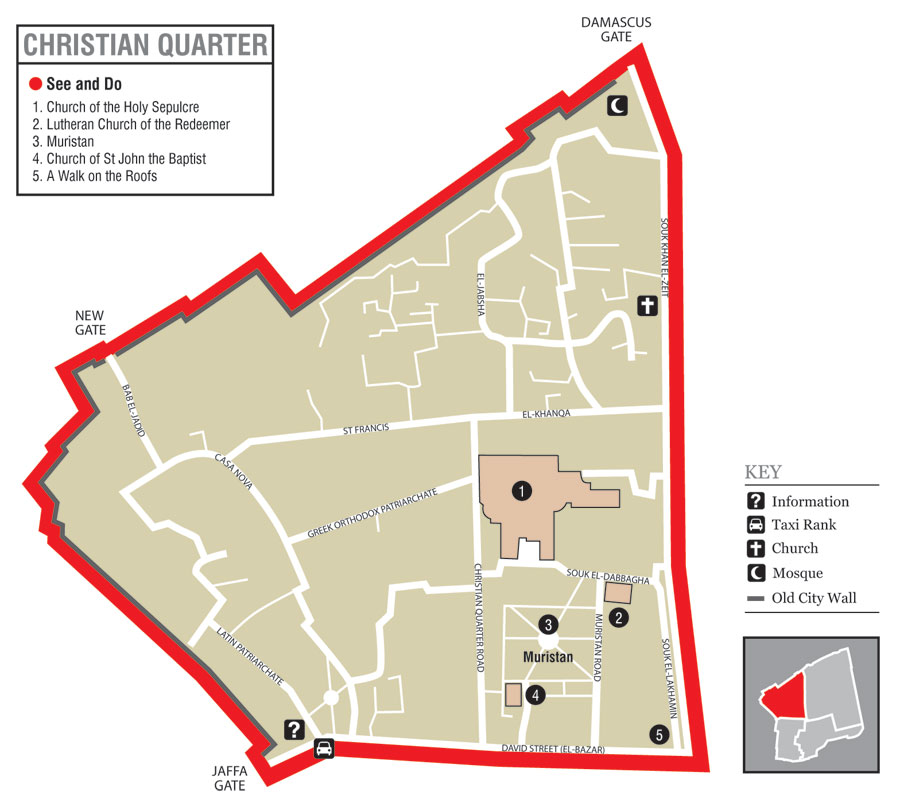
Map of the Christian Quarter of Jerusalem (click to expand)

Located in the Christian Quarter of the Old City of Jerusalem, the Edicule, also known as the Tomb of Christ, within the Church of the Holy Sepulchre is the most holy site for many mainstream denominations within Christianity. The area of the Church is regarded as the site, according to their understanding, where Jesus Christ suffered, was crucified, died, buried and resurrected from the dead along a temporal pathway known as the Via Dolorosa (from the Latin; lit. "way of sorrows"). The first eight Stations of the Cross can be followed along the route leading up to the Church, inside of which are the final five Stations.

The Greek Orthodox Church of Jerusalem, Roman Catholic Church, and Armenian Apostolic Church form the custodians of the Holy Sepulchre and collectively control the most holy pilgrimages within the church along with the Coptic, Syriac, and Ethiopian Orthodox churches who also hold some chapels. Within the walls of the church are the many traditional locations for the events associated with the Passion and death of Jesus: The Stone of Unction (the anointing place of Christ's body), the Prison of Christ (where Jesus was held, incarcerated, before his Passion), a treasure room which holds relics including fragments of the True Cross, and of course Calvary or Golgotha (where Christ was crucified) and the Sepulchre itself – to name a few.

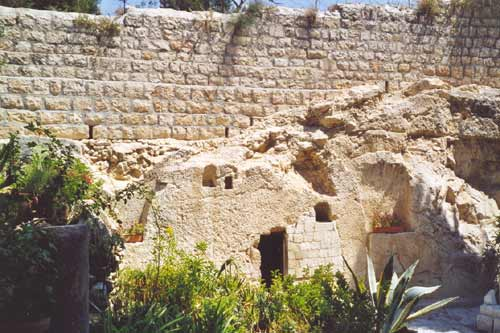
The entrance to the Garden Tomb in 2005

Many Protestant and nontrinitarian denominations regard the nearby Garden Tomb to be the actual crucifixion and resurrection site of Jesus. Still others have claimed that Jesus's tomb is in Japan, or is really located outside of East Jerusalem.

The Altar of the Crucifixion (Golgotha or Calvary, the traditional site of the Crucifixion of Jesus in the Church of the Holy Sepulchre, Jerusalem, in 2011

Other holy sites and shrines of pilgrimage exist in the Holy Land. In Jerusalem the Garden of Gethsemane, the Mount Zion Cenacle of the Last Supper and the Mount of Olives, as well as the Church of the Ascension prove spiritually important. Outside Jerusalem are pilgrimage places including the Sea of Galilee, as well as locations in Bethlehem, Nazareth, and Capernaum:

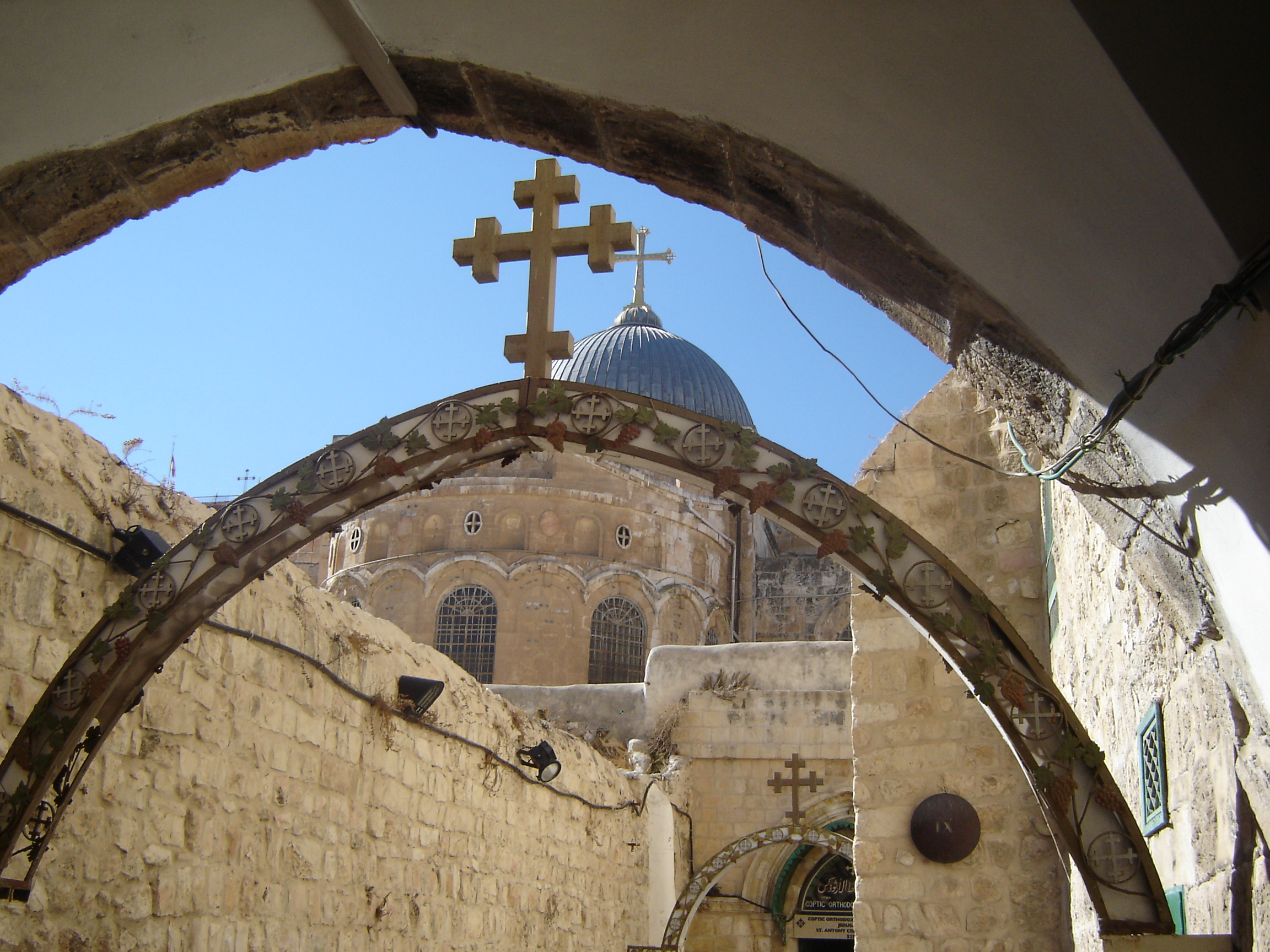
The ninth Stations of the Cross along the Via Dolorosa with the Church of the Holy Sepulchre in the background, in 2006

- Bethlehem: The location of the Church of the Nativity in Manger Square, where Jesus was born.
- Capernaum: The town, bordering the Sea of Galilee, is cited in the Gospel of Luke where it was reported to have been the home of the apostles Simon Peter, Andrew, James and John, as well as the tax collector Matthew. In the Gospel of Matthew the town was reported to have been the home of Jesus. According to Luke, Jesus taught in the synagogue in Capernaum on Sabbath. Jesus then healed a man who had the spirit of an unclean devil and healed a fever in Simon Peter's mother-in-law. According to Luke, it is also the place where a Roman Centurion asked Jesus to heal his servant. Capernaum is also mentioned in the Gospel of Mark, in which it is the location of the famous healing of the paralytic lowered through the roof to reach Jesus. According to several Gospels, Jesus selected this town as the center of his public ministry in the Galilee after he left the small mountainous hamlet of Nazareth. Capernaum has no obvious advantages over any other city in the area, so he probably chose it because it was the home of his first disciples, Simon (Peter) and Andrew.
- Nazareth: The location of the Church of the Annunciation (in the Catholic tradition marks the site where the Archangel Gabriel announced the future birth of Jesus to the Virgin Mary), St. Gabriel's Church (an Orthodox alternative site for the Annunciation), the Synagogue Church (The Melkite Greek Catholic Church lays claim to this site, which is traditionally that of the synagogue where Jesus preached), the Church of St. Joseph's Carpentry (occupies the traditional location for the workshop of Saint Joseph); the Mensa Christi Church (run by the Franciscan religious order, commemorates the traditional location where Jesus dined with the Apostles after his Resurrection), the Basilica of Jesus the Adolescent (run by the Salesian religious order, occupies a hill overlooking the city), the Church of Christ (an Anglican church in Nazareth), and the Church of Our Lady of the Fright (marking the spot where Mary saw Jesus being taken to a cliff by the congregation of the synagogue and felt fear on his account). The "Jesus Trail" pilgrimage route connects many of the religious sites in Nazareth on a 60 km walking trail which ends in Capernaum.

Other important locations identified with the life of Jesus include areas around the Sea of Galilee – for instance Cana and the Church of the Multiplication in Tabgha – as well as the Mount of Temptation (in the Judean Desert), Mount Tabor, Jacob's Well, Bethany and Bethabara (on the Jordan River). The town of Sepphoris is where the Virgin Mary spent her childhood.

Still other revered places may exist within or outside the Holy Land, involving localities associated with the lives of the Twelve Apostles, the Church Fathers, the relatives and ancestors of Jesus, saints, or other figures or events featured in both the Old Testament (sharing religious significance with Judaism or other Abrahamic faiths) and New Testament. The reverence held for these sites may vary depending on denomination.

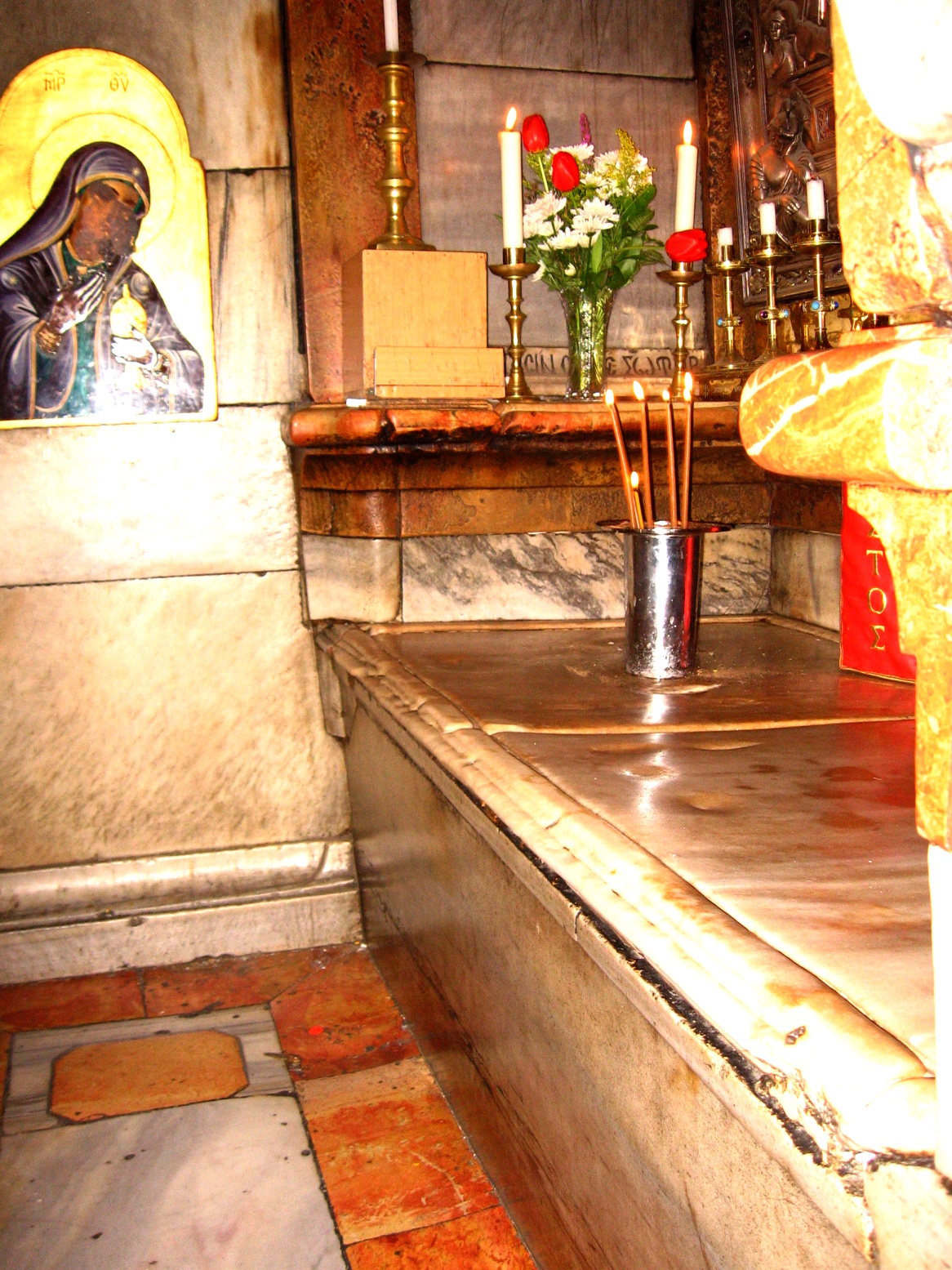
The slab marking the place where Jesus was laid to rest and resurrected in the Tomb or Edicule of the Church of the Holy Sepulchre in 2008

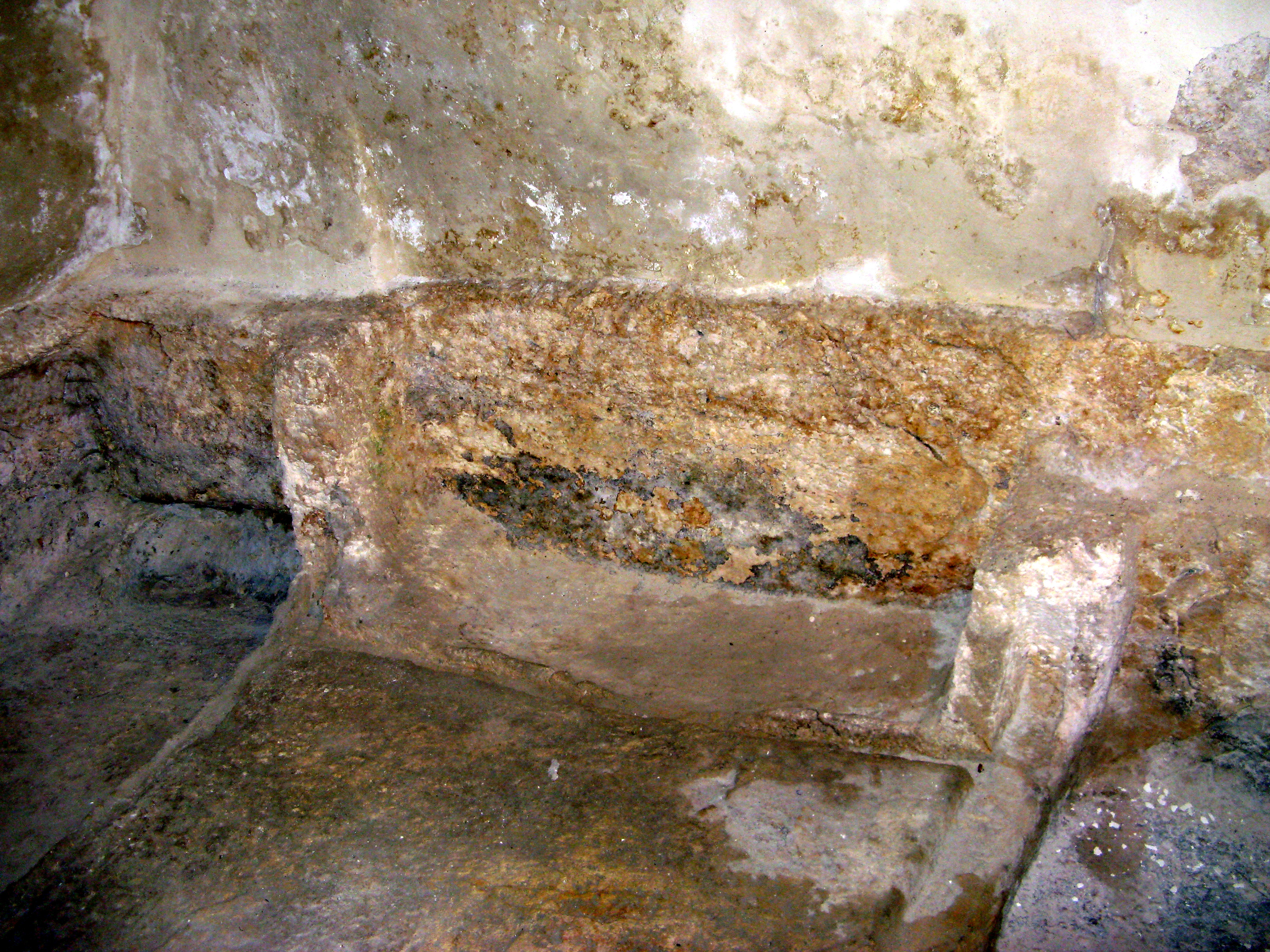
The interior of the Garden Tomb, marking the place where many Protestants and other Christians believe Jesus was laid to rest and resurrected, in 2008

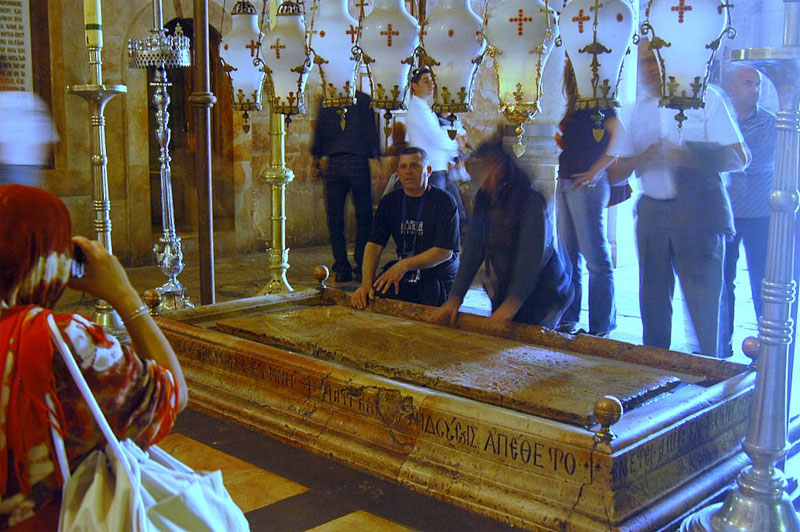
The Stone of Unction – the traditional site of the anointing of Jesus's body after the crucifixion – in the Church of the Holy Sepulchre in 2007

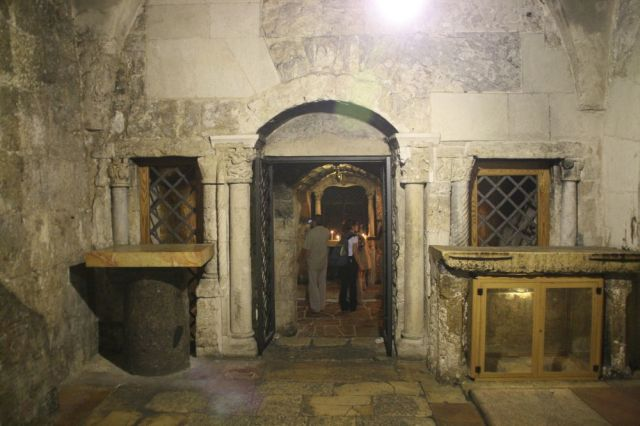
The Prison of Christ in 2007. This prison is where it is believed Jesus was held, incarcerated, before his Passion, and is now located in the Church of the Holy Sepulchre.

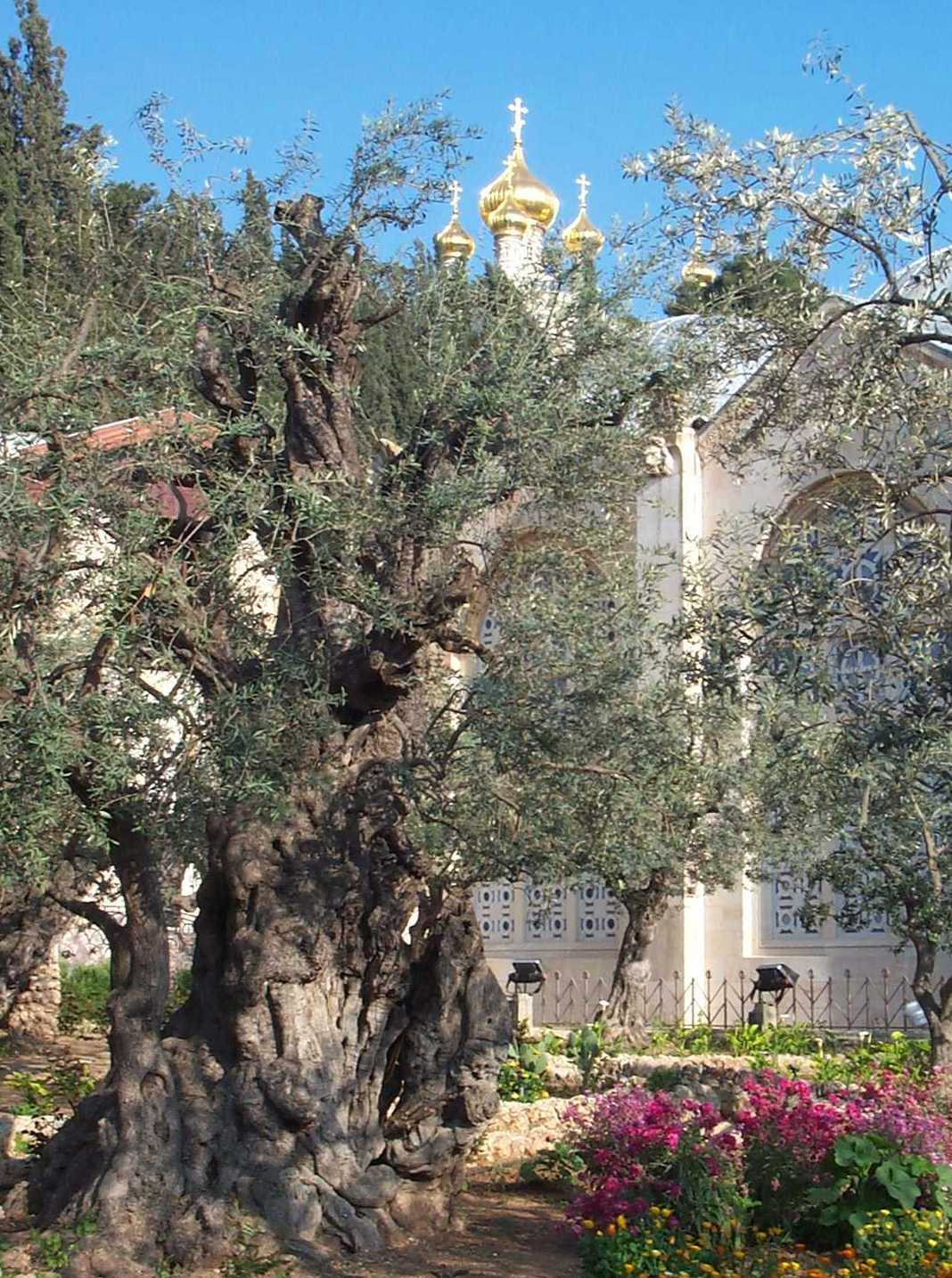
The Garden of Gethsemane in Jerusalem in 2006, with the Russian Orthodox Church of Mary Magdalene in the background. According to biblical texts, Jesus and his disciples are said to have prayed here the night before his crucifixion.

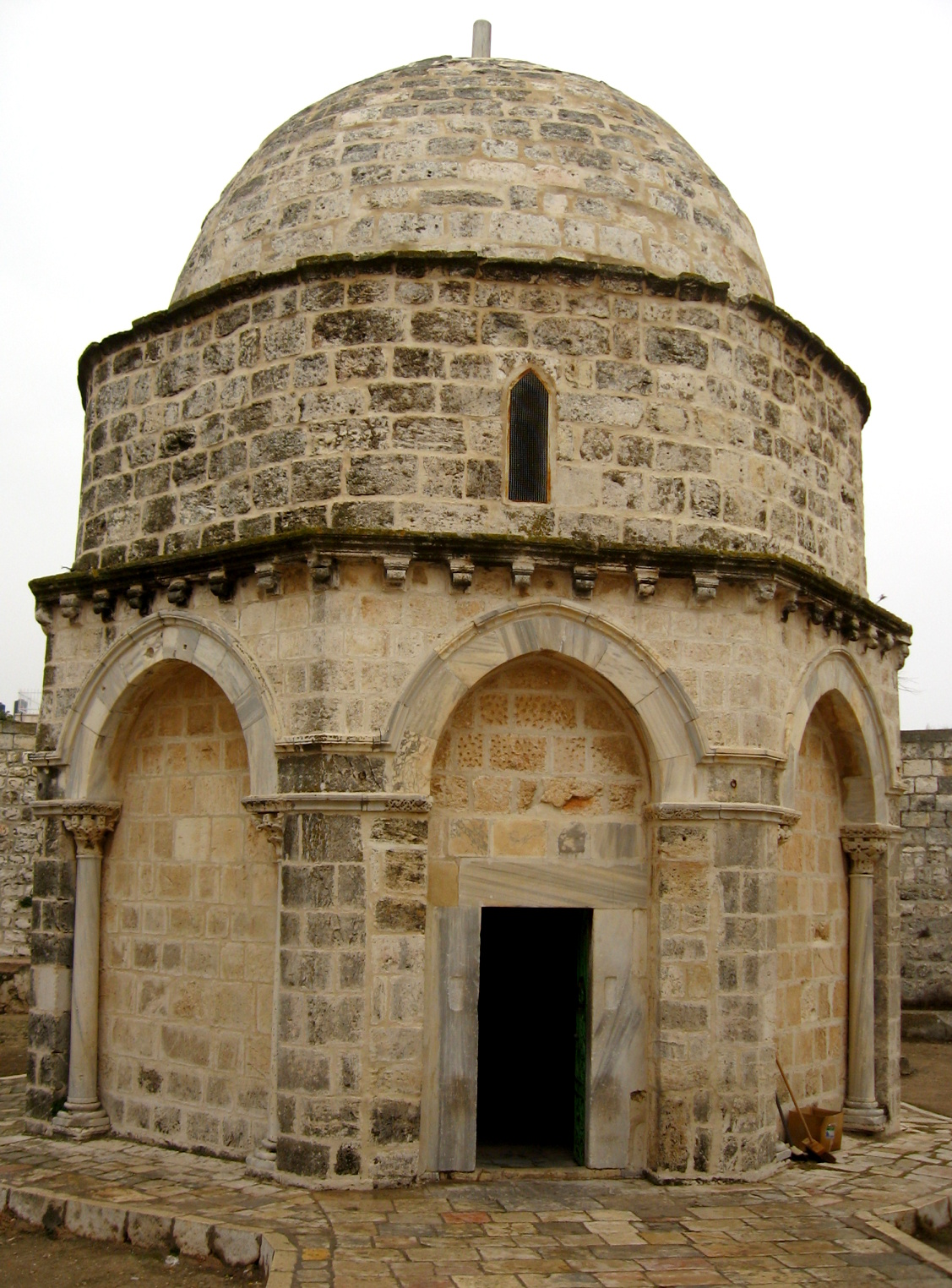
The Chapel of the Ascension in 2008, on the Mount of Olives in Jerusalem. The Mount of Olives is where Jesus preached the Sermon on the Mount and the chapel the place from which he ascended to Heaven.

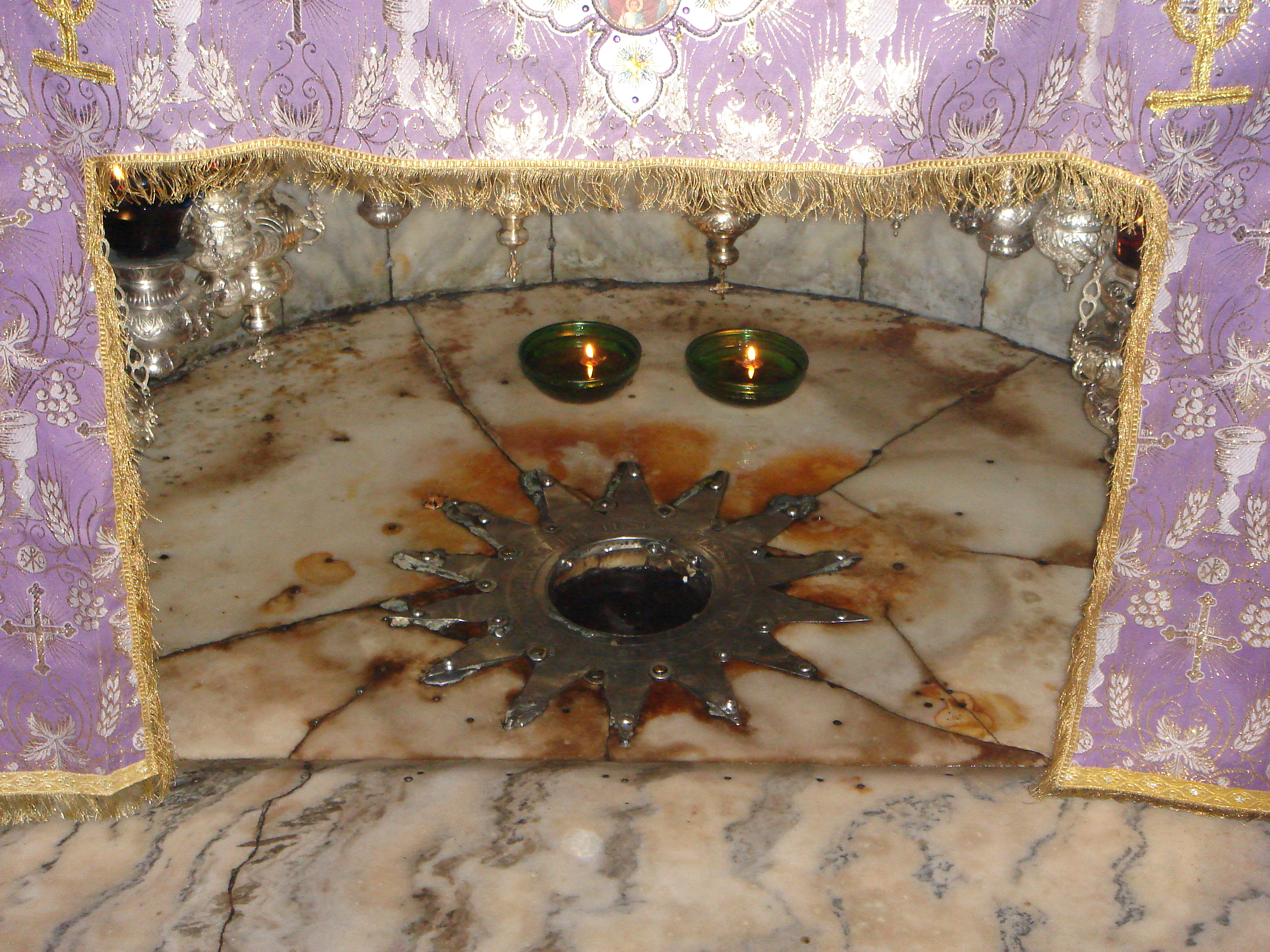
The Silver Star marking the birthplace of Jesus in the Church of the Nativity in Manger Square, Bethlehem, in 2007

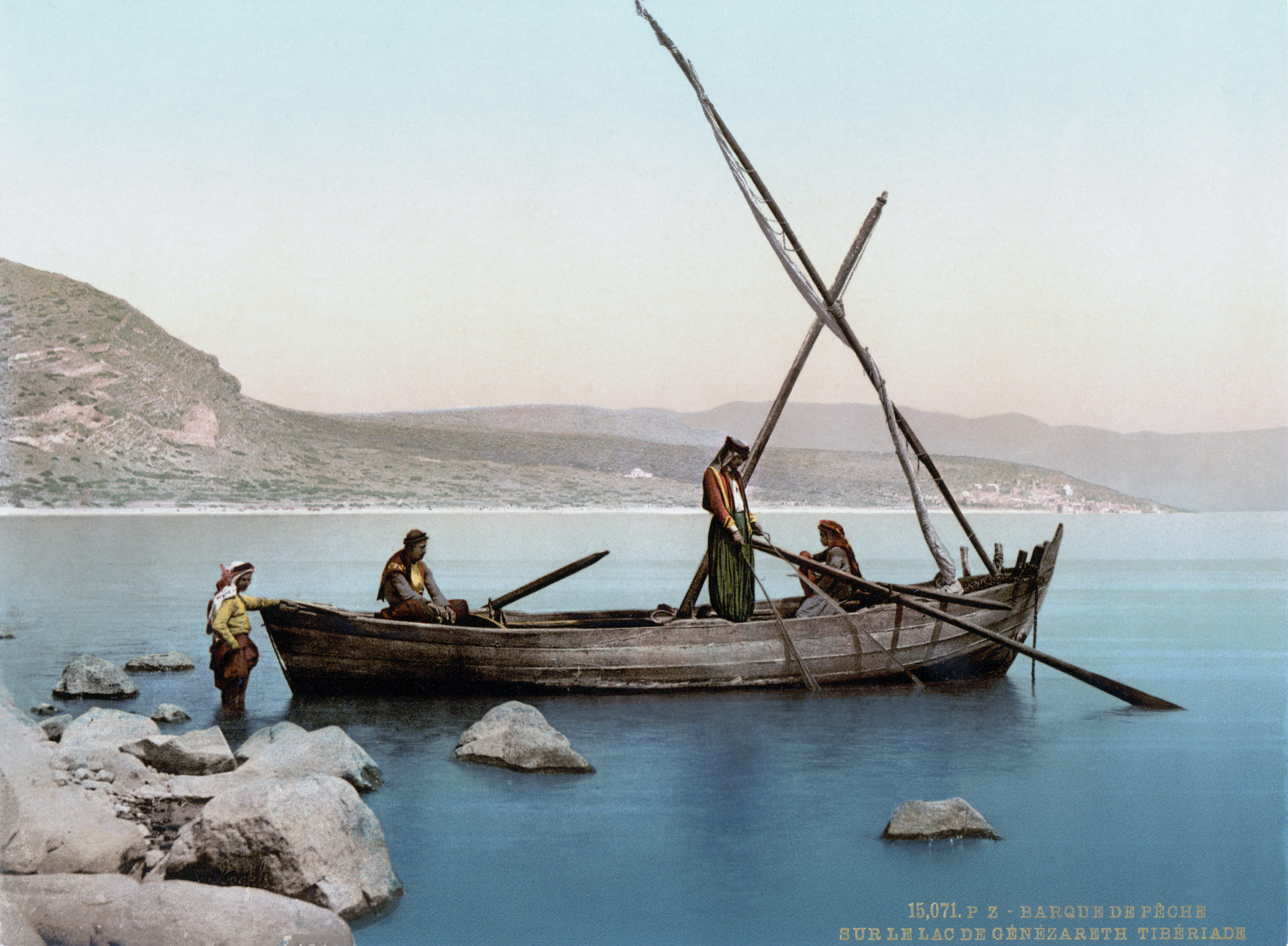
A lithograph of fisherman on the Sea of Galilee in the late 19th century. The Lake and various sites bordering it (such as Cana, Capernaum and Tabgha) are where Jesus's ministry flourished and where he is supposed to have performed miracles.

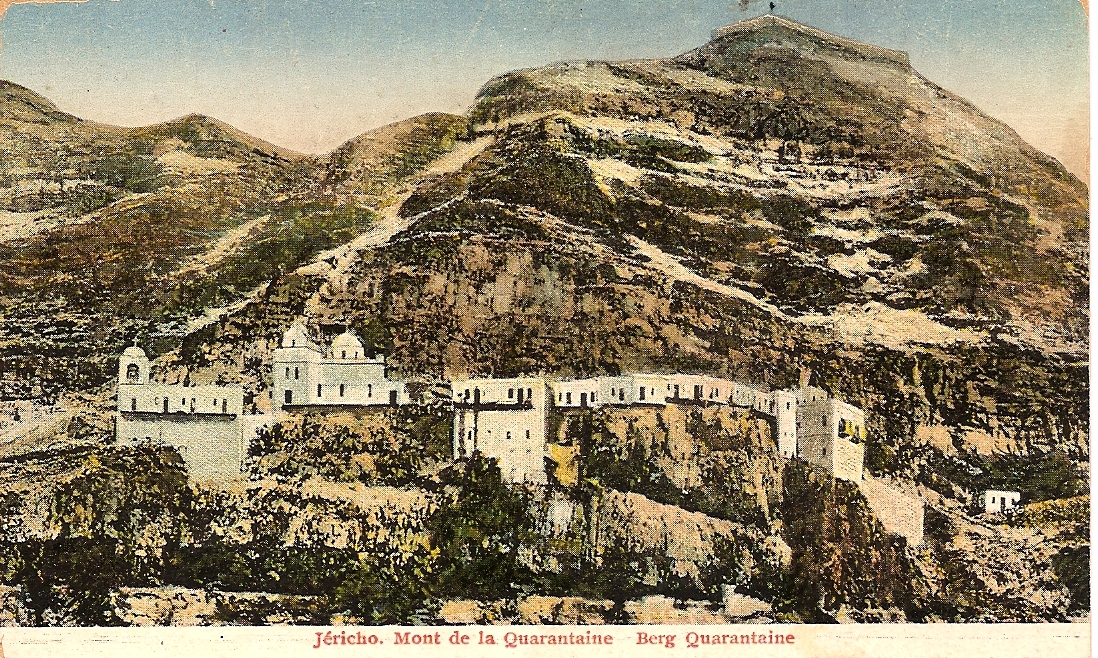
A 2008 postcard image of the Mount of Temptation (or Mount Quarantania) near Jericho in the Judean desert, where Christ was tempted by Satan

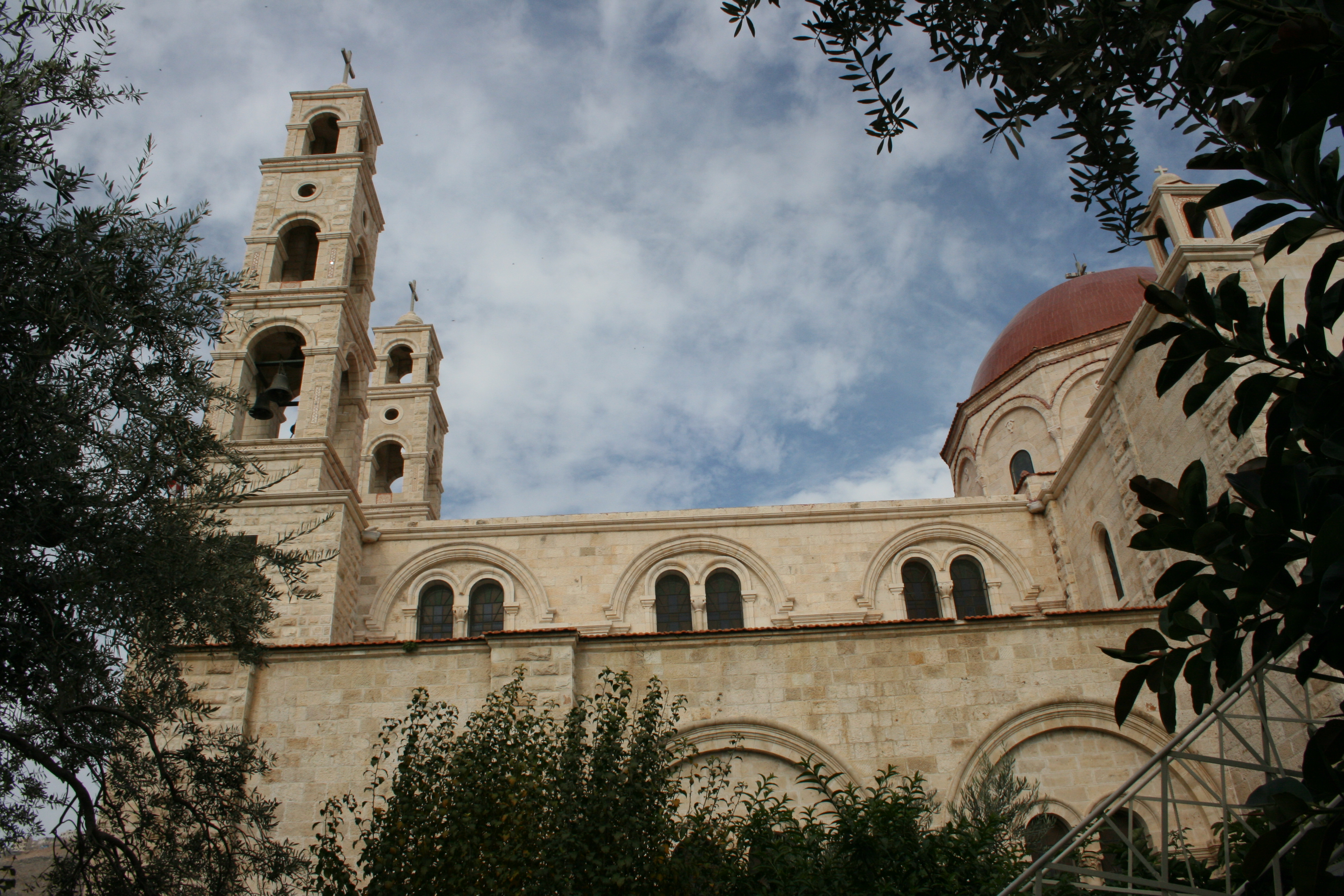
The Church of St. Photina near Jacob's Well, a New Testament landmark, in 2008. It is here that Jesus met a Samaritan woman and preached to her.

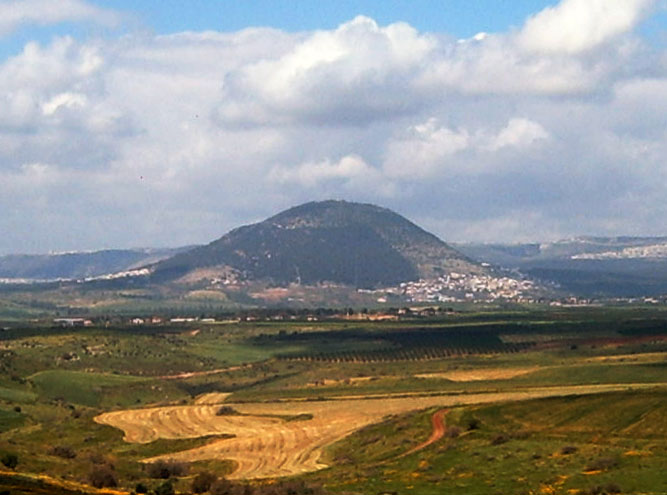
Mount Tabor in Lower Galilee, the site of the Transfiguration of Jesus, in 2010

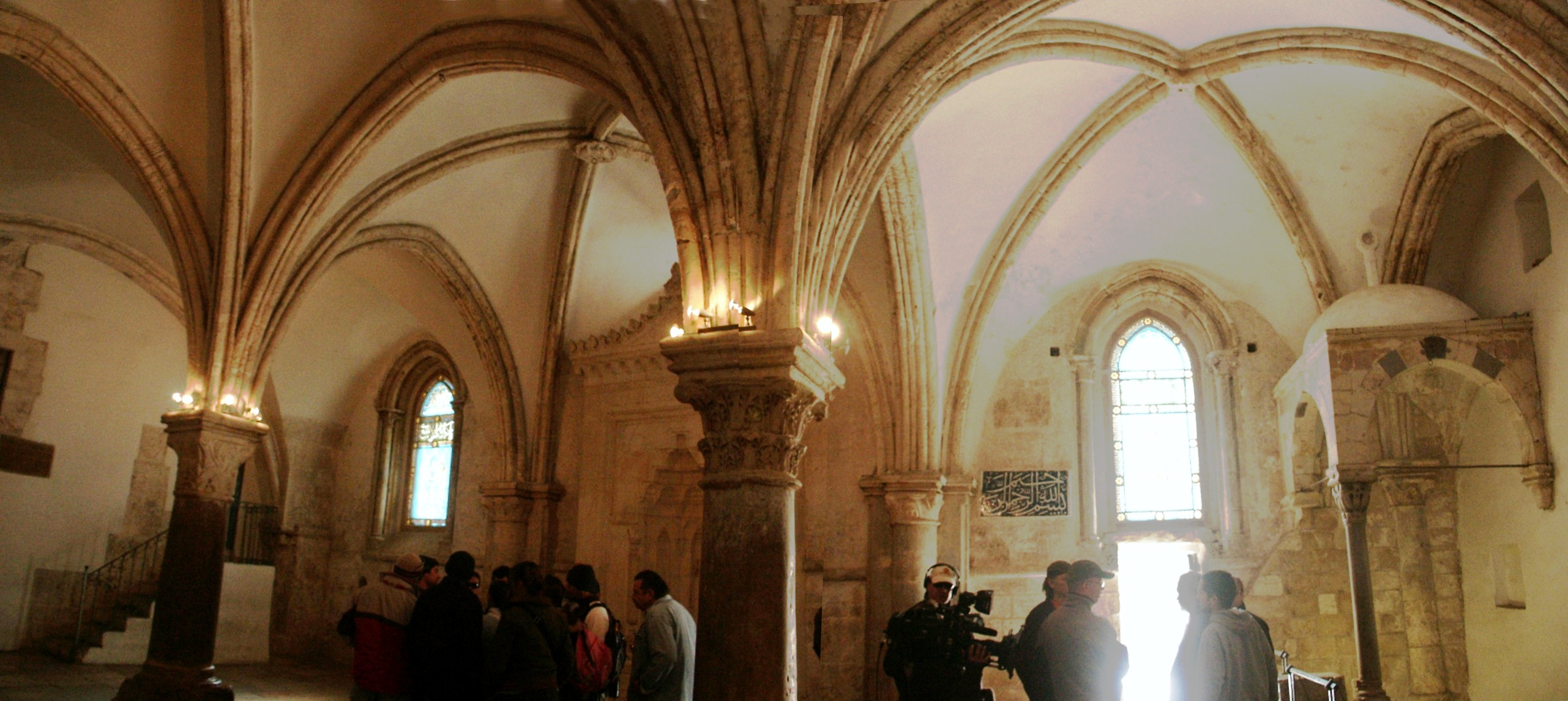
The Cenacle of Mount Zion in Jerusalem, the site of the Last Supper and Pentecost, in 2008

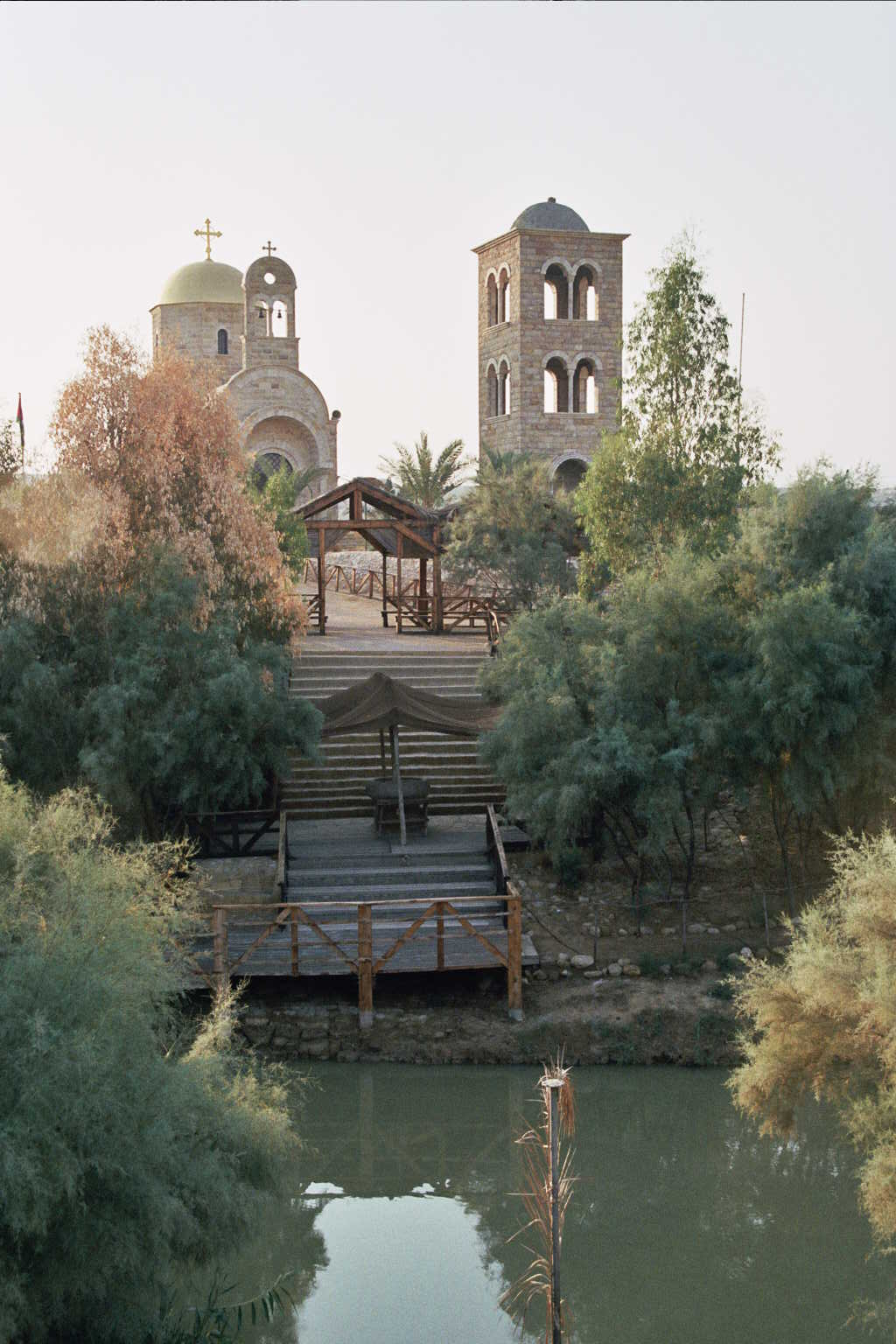
Qasr el Yahud, one of the locations where Jesus was baptized by John the Baptist in the Jordan River, in 2007. Other locations associated with Jesus's baptism include Bethabara (or Ænon) and Al Maghtas. All are near to each other along the Jordan.

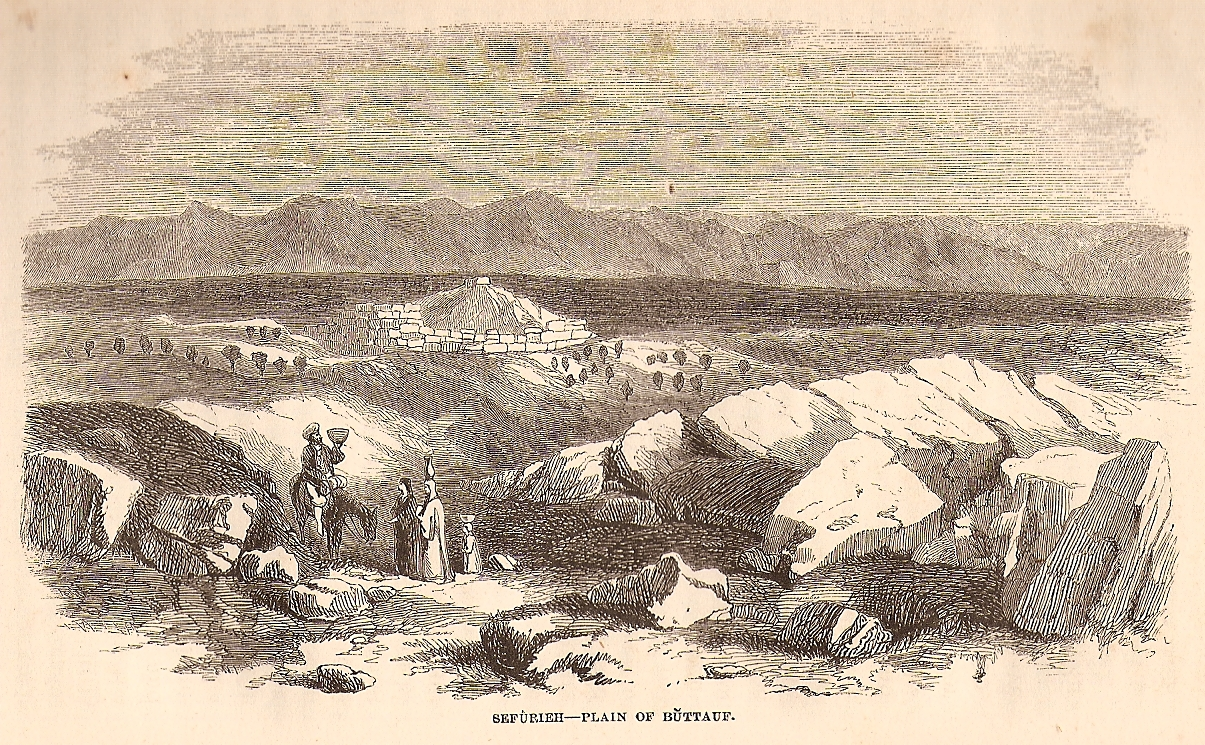
An 1859 Palestinian sketch of the site of Sepphoris, where the Virgin Mary is said to have spent her childhood

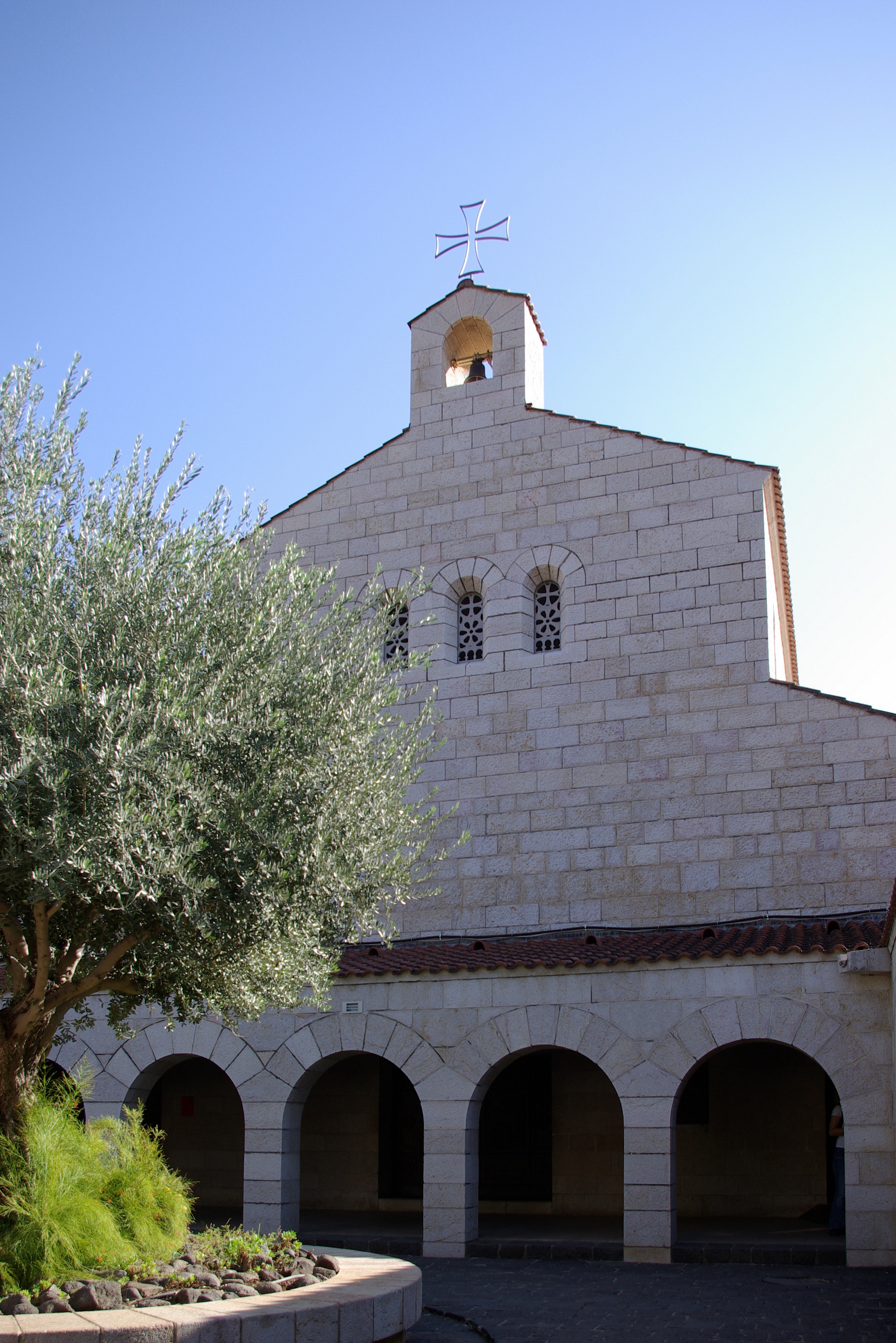
The Church of the Multiplication in Tabgha in 2008. The church is built upon the site where Christ fed the multitude.

==== Catholic Church ====
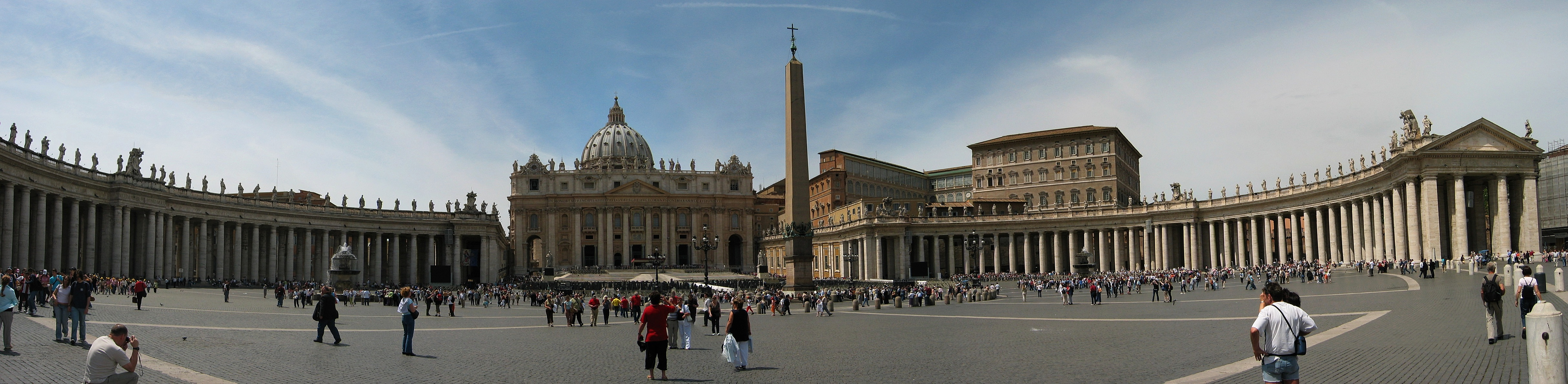
A panoramic photograph of St. Peter's Square

Catholics, like many other Christians, regards the Sepulchre in Jerusalem to be the holiest of places. It also places emphasis on Nazareth, Bethlehem, Capernaum, and other parts of the Holy Land as sacred since apostolic times, and notes as places of special sanctity the sanctuaries built on the tombs of the Apostles.

Mainstream Catholicism as a whole is represented by the Holy See (Latin: Sancta Sedes, "holy chair") of the Vatican City state (Italian: Stato della Città del Vaticano), a walled enclave within Rome, Italy. Inside the Vatican the largest church in history, St. Peter's Basilica (L.: Basilica Sancti Petri), is the location of the Papal office and the living quarters of the Pope (in the Apostolic Palace), as well as Vatican Hill – atop which are Saint Peter's tomb and place of crucifixion, his throne, and St. Peter's Baldachin. Outside St. Peter's Square are many more churches throughout the Vatican and outlying Rome. One important landmark is the Sistine Chapel (L.: Sacellum Sixtinum; I.: Cappella Sistina), in which the Papal conclave takes place.

Rome is the place from which Catholics believe the one, holy, catholic and apostolic church was formally founded and begun by Saint Peter (whom they consider to be the "Prince of the Apostles") as the appointed successor and first vicar of Christ. Thus while the Holy Sepulchre is still the most sanctified of places for Catholics, the Vatican is an extremely sacred place to the faithful (those of the Latin Church, as well as the Churches sui iuris) as the seat of their supreme authority on Earth. Important papal territories include the four major basilicas (L.: Basilica maior, pl. -es; excluding St. Peter's) – namely the Archbasilica of Saint John Lateran (the ecumenical Catholic mother church), St. Peter's Basilica, the Basilica of Saint Paul Outside the Walls (containing the tomb of Paul the Apostle), and the Basilica di Santa Maria Maggiore.

Other locations of reverence for ardent Catholics include Marian shrines, particularly the localities of Fátima and Lourdes, where miracles or apparitions attributed to the Virgin Mary took place.

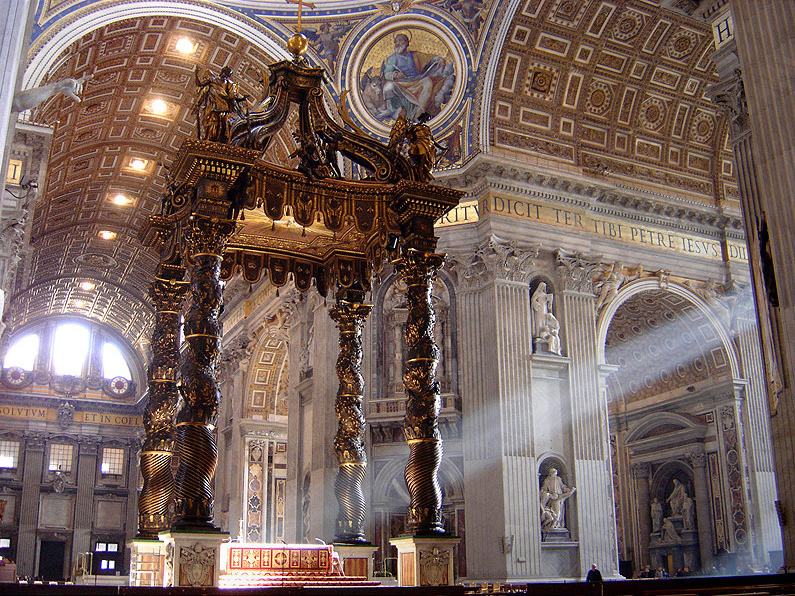
St. Peter's baldachin in 2005. Beneath is the high altar, built atop St. Peter's tomb.

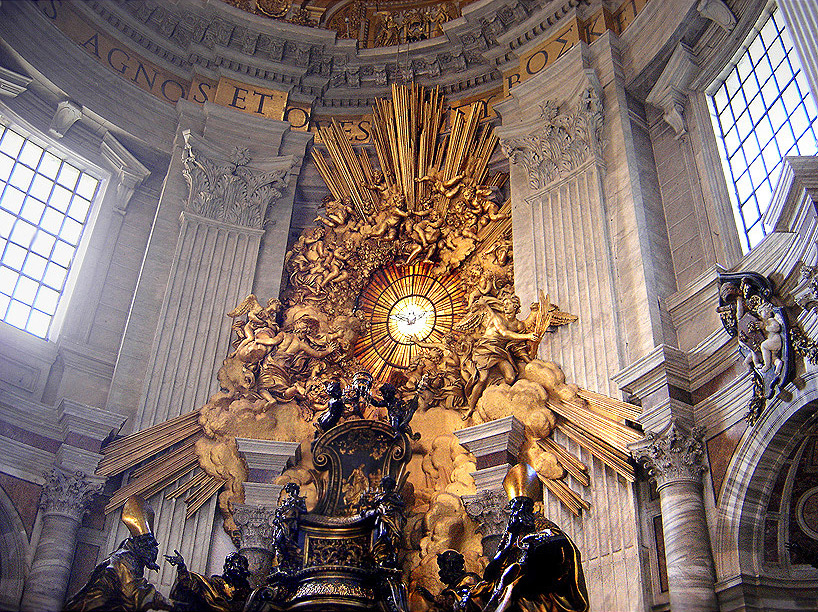
The Cathedra Petri, or throne of St. Peter, in 2005

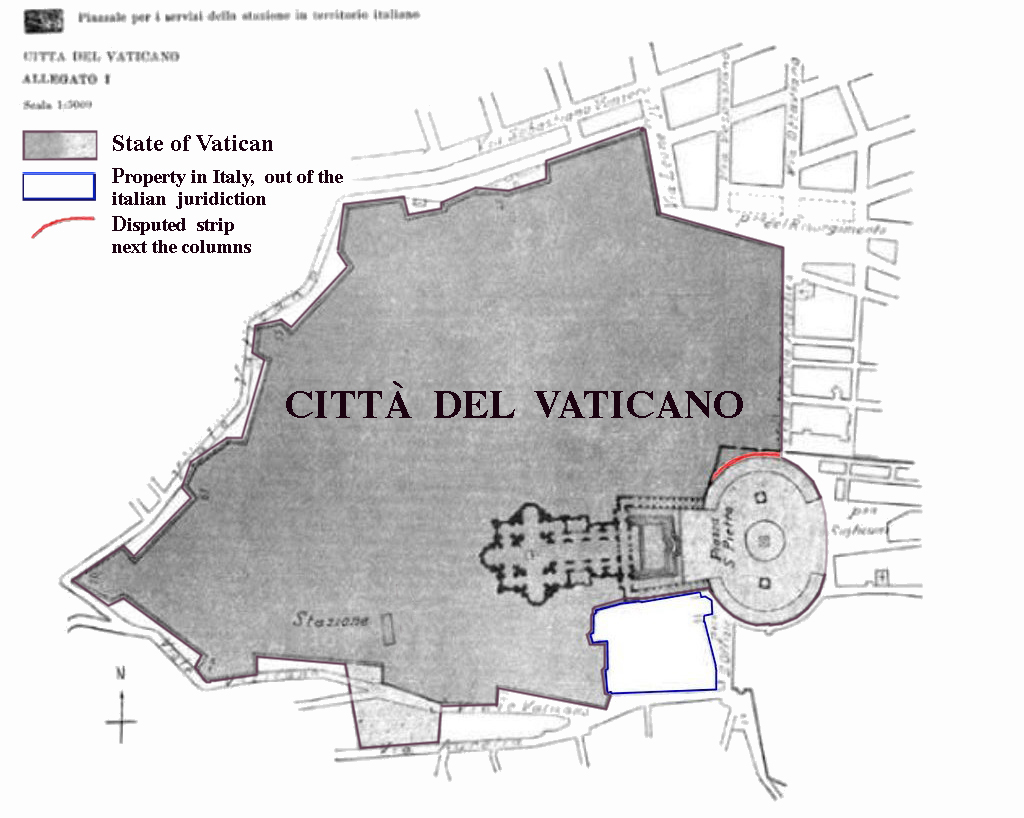
A map of the territory of the Vatican City state (in dark grey) according to the Lateran Treaty

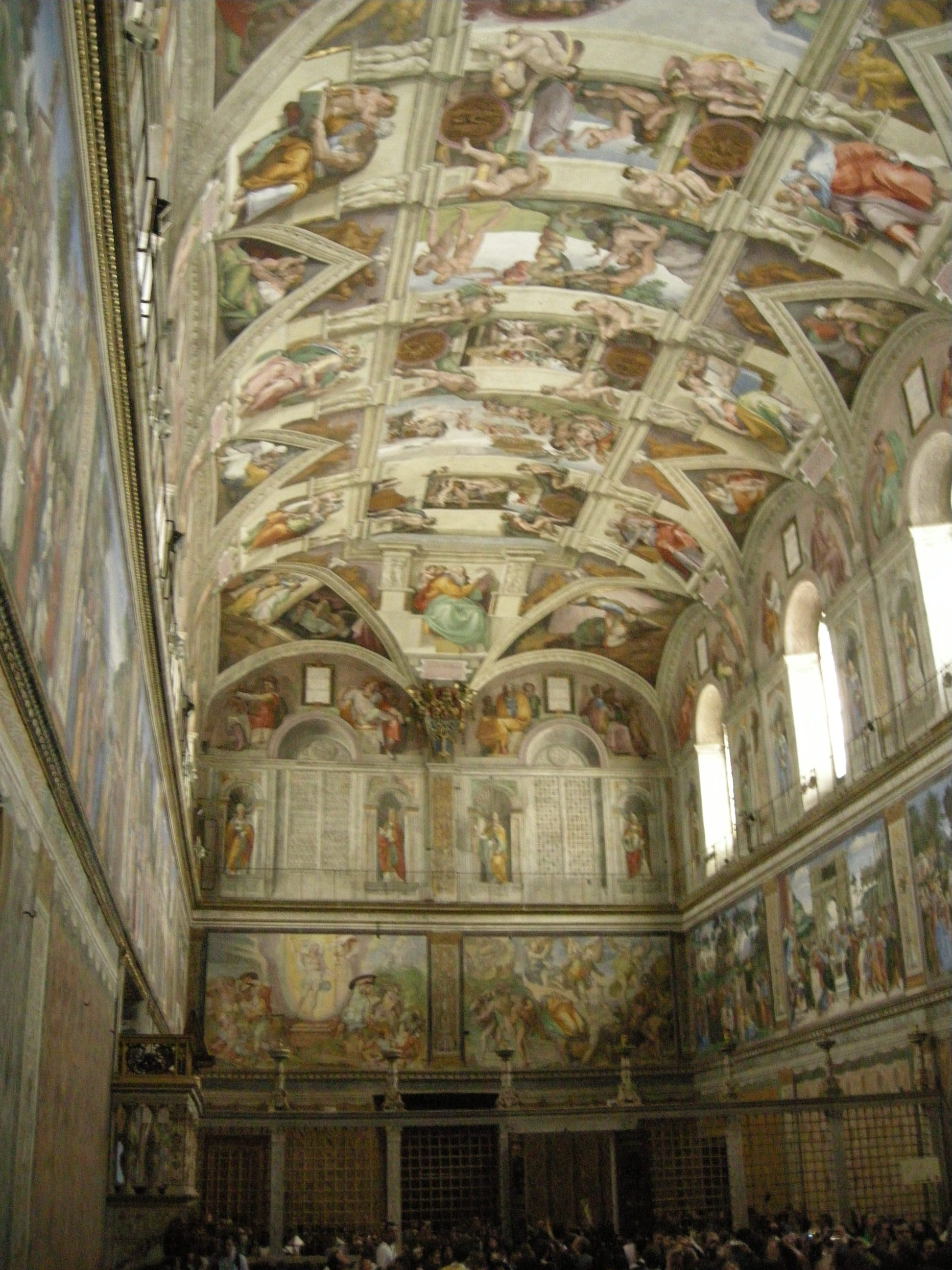
The interior of the Sistine Chapel in 2010

The Sanctuary of Our Lady of Fátima in Fátima, Portugal

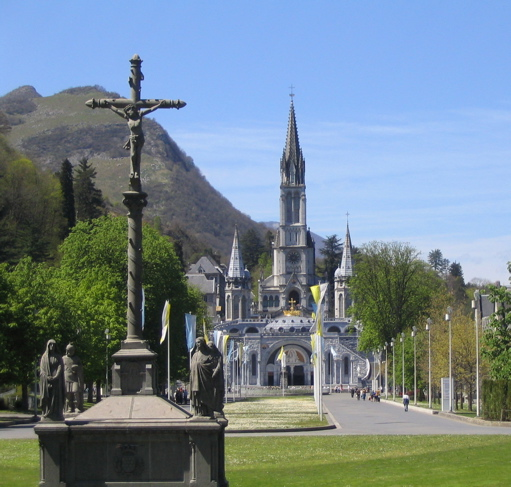
The Sanctuary of Our Lady of Lourdes

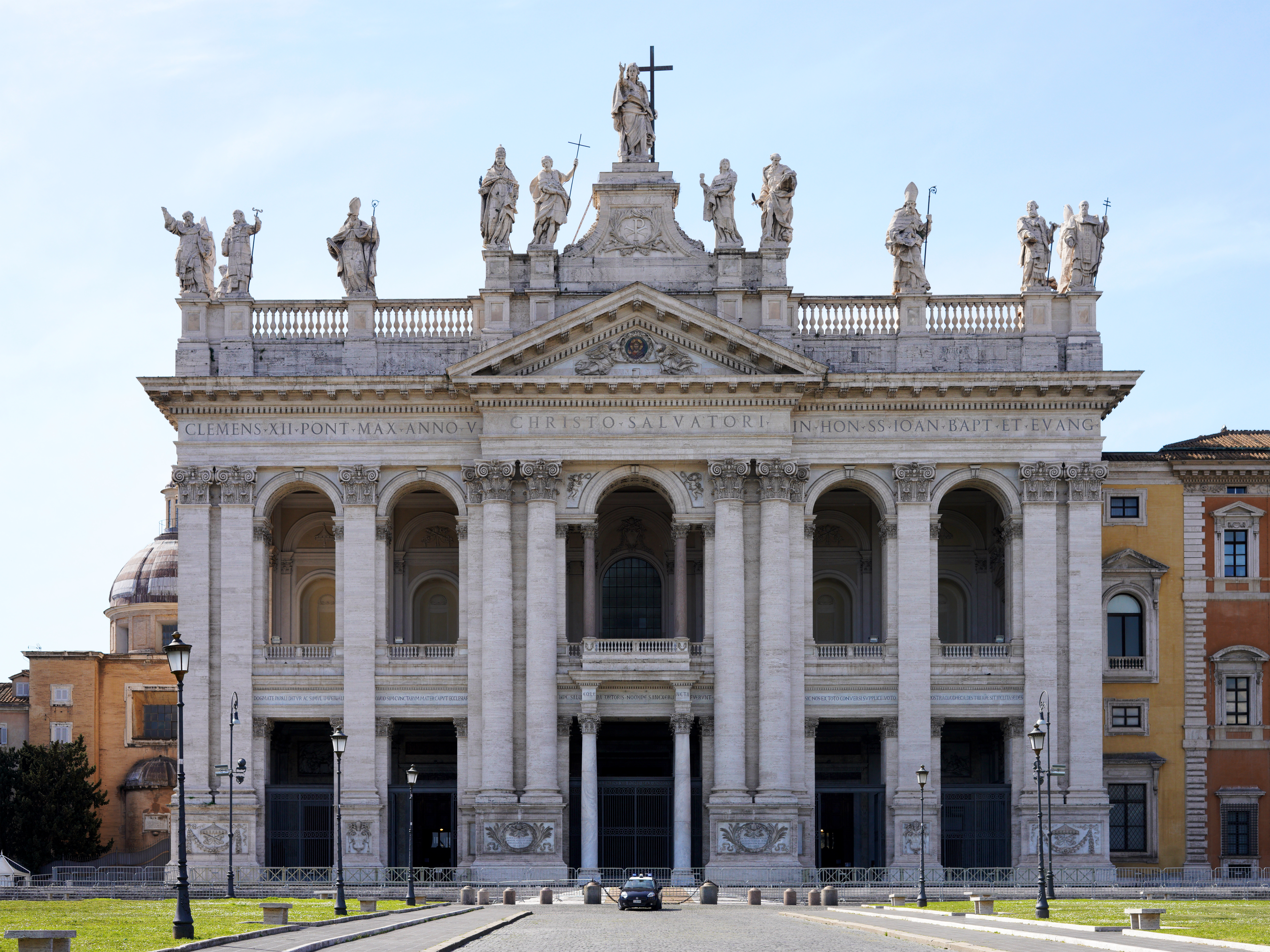
The Archbasilica of Saint John Lateran in 2021

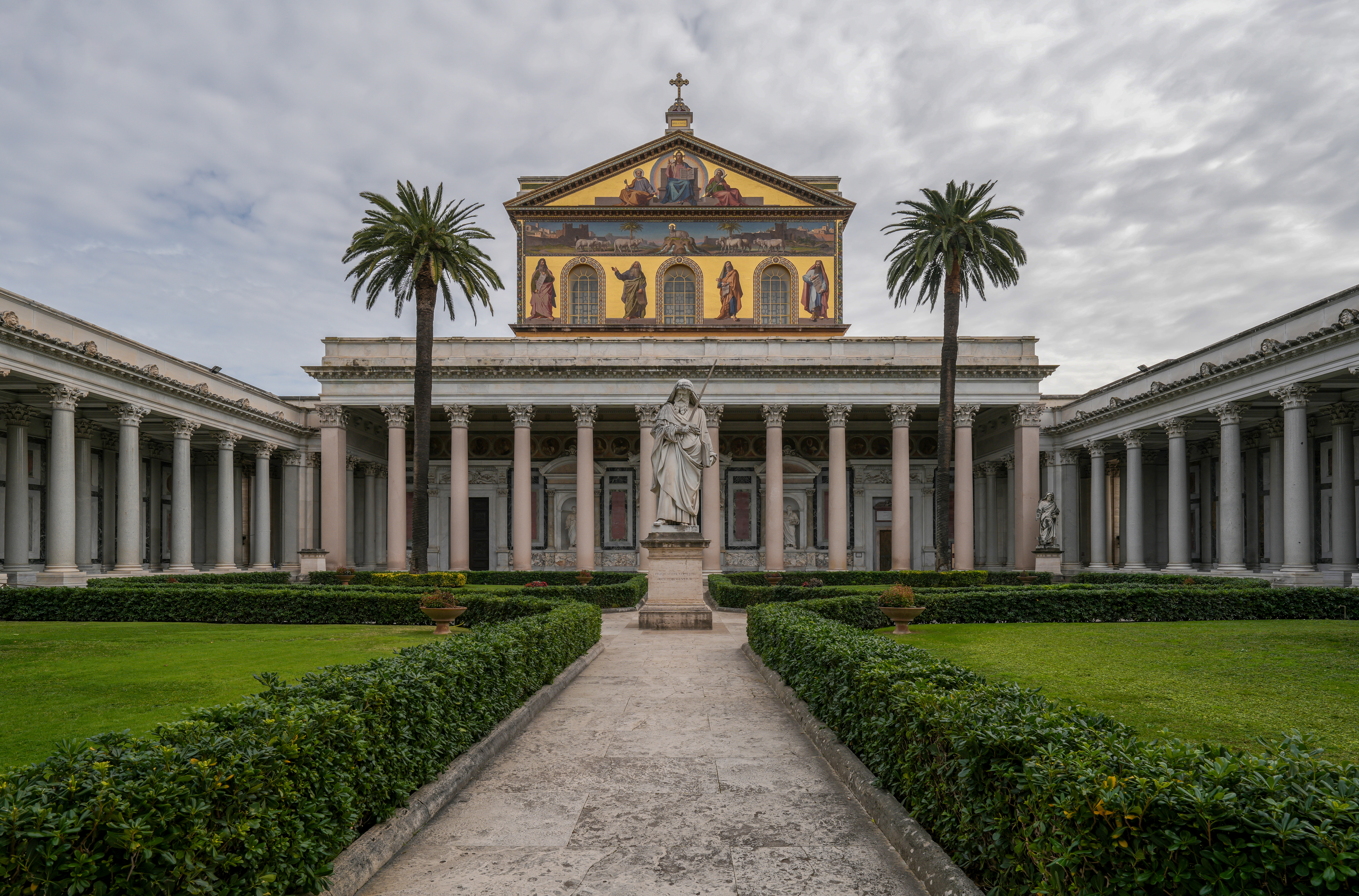
The façade of the Basilica of St. Paul Outside the Walls in 2007

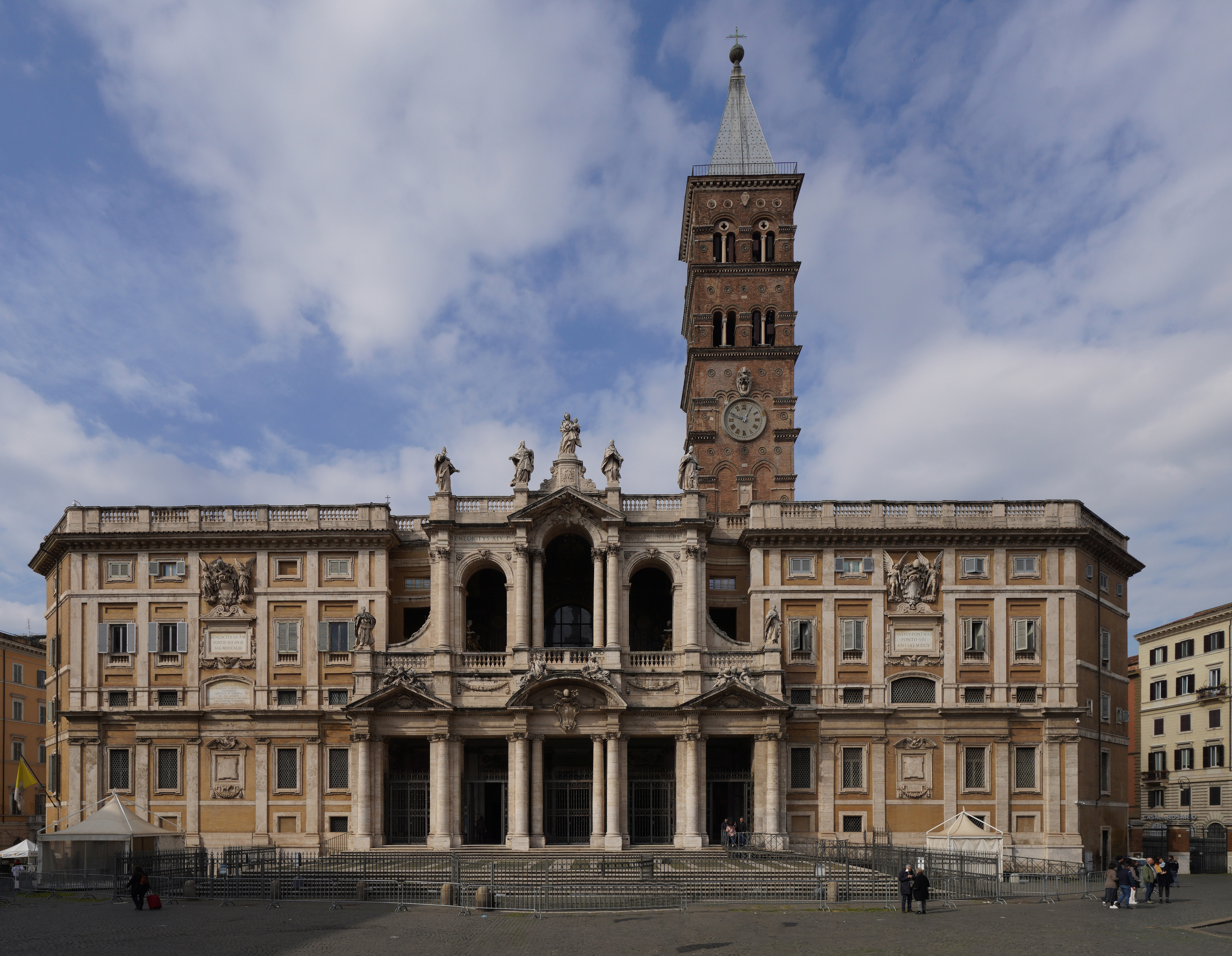
The Basilica di Santa Maria Maggiore in 2022

==== Eastern Christianity ====
Orthodox or Eastern Christians, like many other Christians, regard the Sepulchre in Jerusalem to be the holiest of places. They place emphasis on Nazareth, Bethlehem, Capernaum and other parts of the Holy Land as sacred since apostolic times, and note as places of special sanctity the sanctuaries built on the tombs of the apostles and other saints. There are many shrines with the relics of Christian saints and martyrs which are sacred pilgrimage sites for Orthodox Christians as well.

Historically, four of the five major episcopal sees of the Roman Empire (the Pentarchy) represent the modern patriarchal centers of the majority of Orthodox churches. These are, namely, Alexandria, Antioch, Constantinople and Jerusalem – excluding Rome.

Among the Orthodox, there are many monasteries and convents which are held in high honor and sacred veneration.

===== Eastern Orthodox Church =====
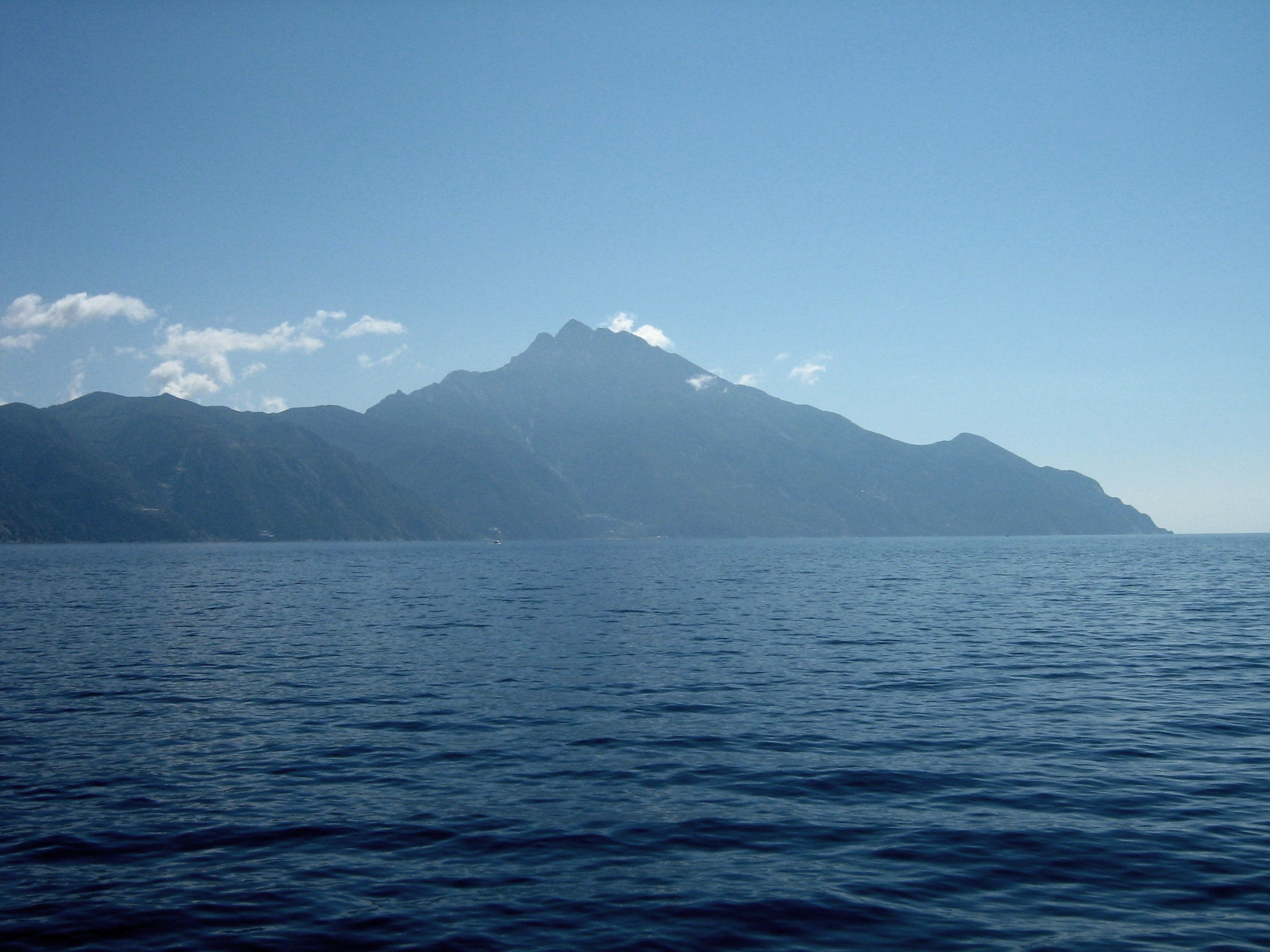
The coastline of Mount Athos in 2007

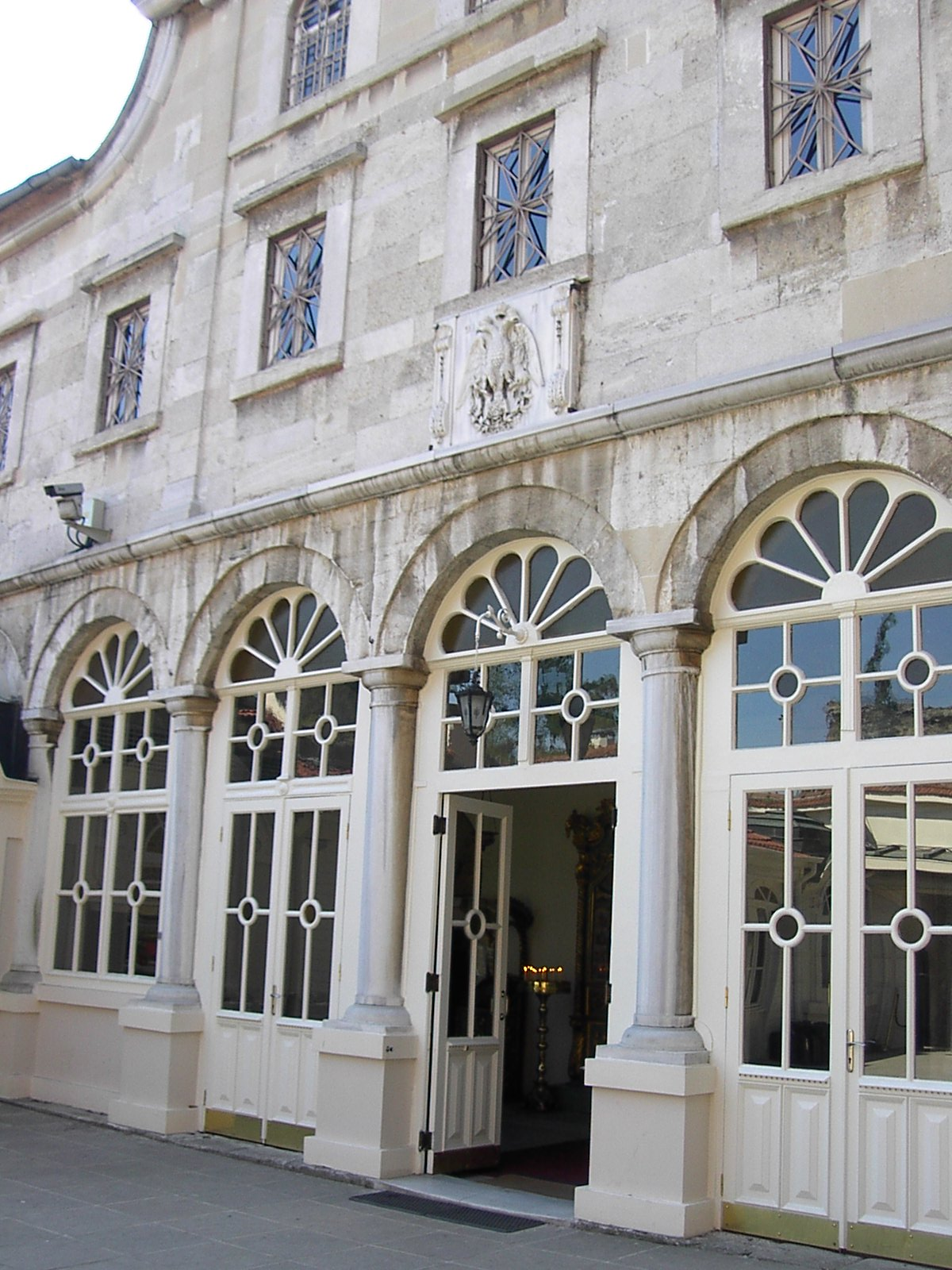
The exterior of the Church of St. George in Istanbul in 2007

If the Ecumenical Patriarch of Constantinople is taken to be one of the most prominent leaders in the Eastern Orthodox Communion, then St. George's Cathedral in Istanbul – the seat of the Ecumenical Patriarch – may perhaps be one of the most important religious sites for Eastern Orthodox Christians.

Also of particular importance to the Eastern Orthodox Church and particularly the Greek Orthodox Church is the peninsular Mount Athos, where the most masses in the world are celebrated daily in the Byzantine Rite. Mount Athos arguably comprises the largest community of Christian monastics, ascetics, and mystics (specifically hesychasts) in the world. It is home to twenty Eastern Orthodox monasteries under the direct jurisdiction of the Ecumenical Patriarch.

===== Oriental Orthodox churches =====
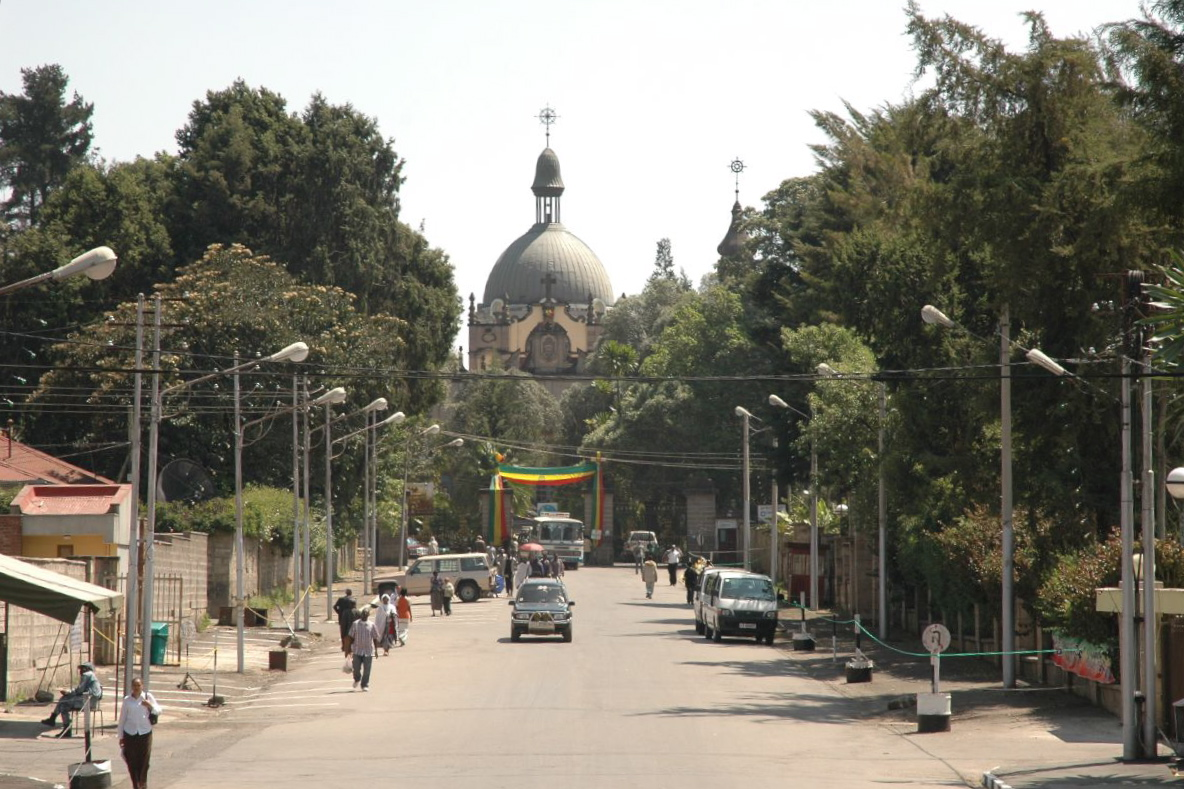
A road in Addis Ababa, Ethiopia, leading to the Holy Trinity Cathedral, the patriarchate of the Ethiopian Orthodox Church and a sacred place for members of the Rastafari movement

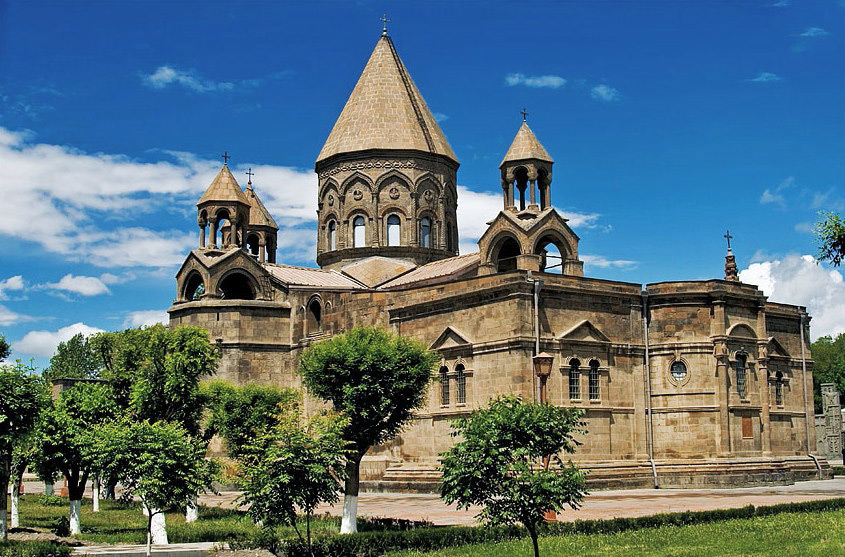
Etchmiadzin Cathedral in Vagharshapat, Armenia, in 2009

Oriental Orthodoxy is the faith of those Eastern Christian churches that recognize only three ecumenical councils – the First Council of Nicaea, the First Council of Constantinople and the First Council of Ephesus. They rejected the dogmatic definitions of the Council of Chalcedon (c. 451). Hence, these Oriental Orthodox Churches are also called Old Oriental Churches, Miaphysite Churches, or the Non-Chalcedonian Churches. These churches are generally not in communion with any of the multifarious Eastern Orthodox Churches but they are in dialogue for a return to unity.

Despite the potentially confusing nomenclature (Oriental meaning Eastern), Oriental Orthodox churches are distinct from those that are collectively referred to as the Eastern Orthodox Church. The Oriental Orthodox communion comprises five basic groups: Coptic Orthodox, Ethiopian Orthodox, Eritrean Orthodox, Syriac Orthodox, and Armenian Apostolic churches. These churches, while being in communion with one another, are hierarchically independent.

The Malankara Orthodox Syrian Church or Indian Orthodox church is technically autonomous, but still shares some ties with the Syriac Orthodox church.

This being the case, each of the six communal churches has their own spiritual headquarters which act as the episcopal sees of their respective Popes or Patriarchs:

- Armenian Apostolic – Etchmiadzin Cathedral (Mother See of Holy Etchmiadzin), Vagharshapat, Armenia
- Coptic Orthodox – St. Mark's Coptic Orthodox Cathedral in Abbassia in Cairo, Egypt (formerly St. Mark's Coptic Orthodox Cathedral in Alexandria, Egypt)
- Eritrean Orthodox – Asmara, Eritrea
- Ethiopian Orthodox – Holy Trinity Cathedral, Addis Ababa, Ethiopia (see also Rastafari movement)
- Indian Orthodox – Kottayam, India
- Syriac Orthodox (includes the Malankara Church and other Saint Thomas Christians) – Bab Tuma borough, Damascus, Syria (formerly Antioch; temporarily stationed in Homs, Mardin, et al.)
  - The Syriac Patriarch himself resides in Dayro d-Mor Ephrem, a monastery near Damascus
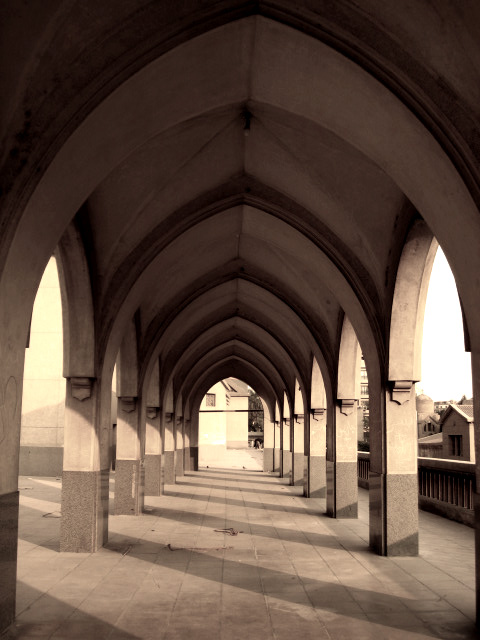
The interior of St. Mark's Coptic Orthodox Cathedral in Cairo, Egypt, in 2008

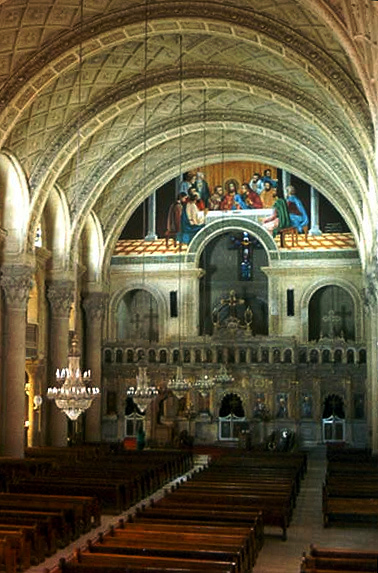
The interior of St. Mark's Coptic Orthodox Cathedral in Alexandria, Egypt, in 2006

==== Latter-day Saints ====
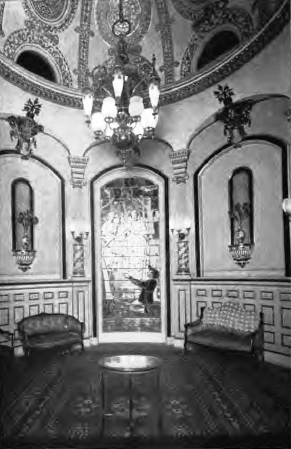
The Holy of Holies as it appeared in the early 20th century

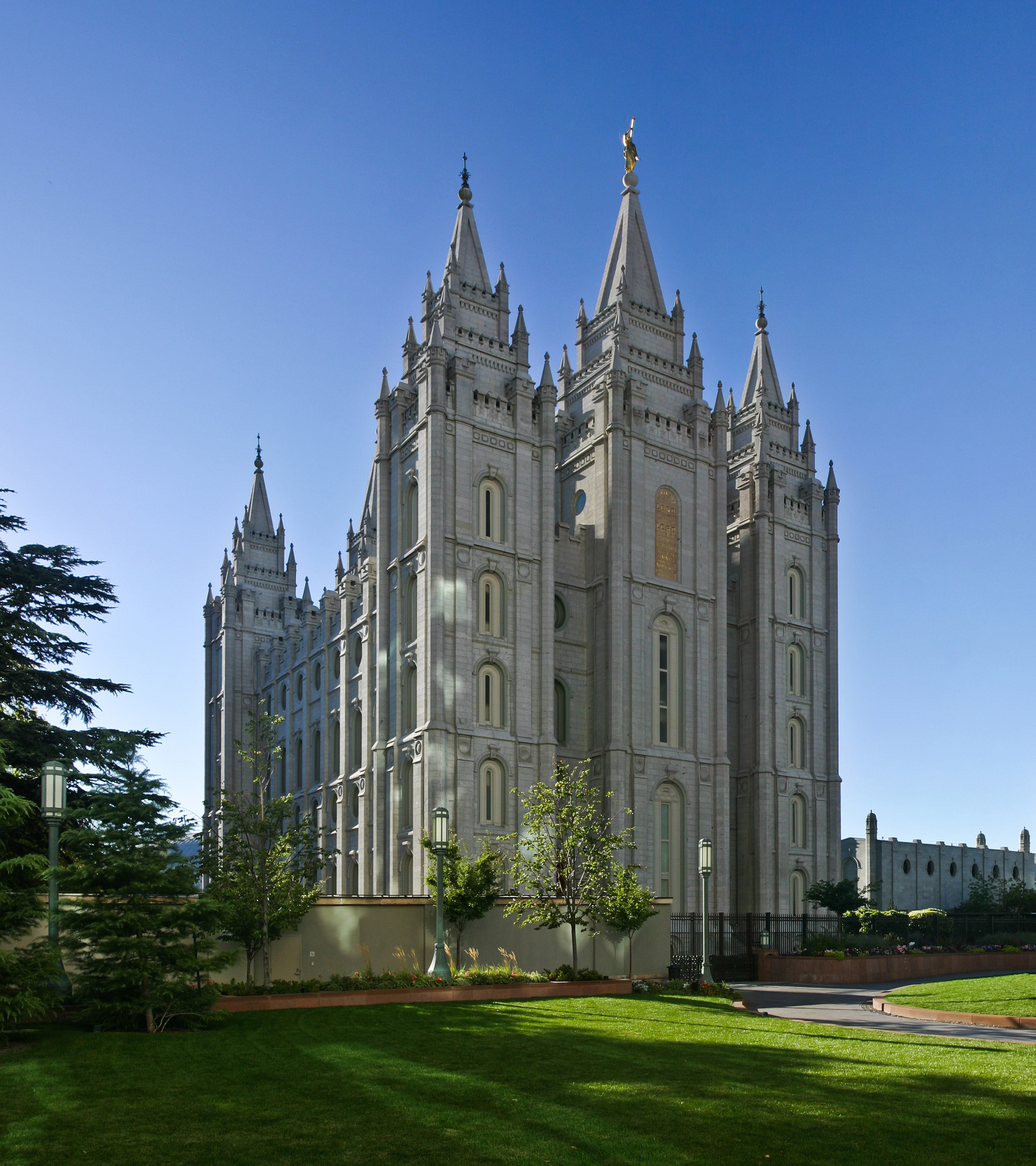
The Salt Lake Temple

Latter-day Saints regard with reverence such places as the Garden Tomb and the Garden of Gethsemane in Jerusalem, due their connections with the life and ministry of Jesus. Additionally, the most holy place for members of the mainstream LDS Church are the numerous temples around the world, particularly the "celestial room" located inside each temple. The purpose of these ordinance rooms is to act as a symbolic representation of the presence of God himself. Additionally, a room inside the Salt Lake Temple, designated as the Holy of Holies, is considered highly sacred due its primary function as a private meditation room for the church's president.

Mormon homes are also treated as sacred areas due to the church's emphasis on the sacredness of family union and family-based ceremonies performed in LDS temples. On this subject, the Bible Dictionary in the LDS edition of the Bible states:

A temple is literally a house of the Lord, a holy sanctuary in which sacred ceremonies and ordinances of the gospel are performed by and for the living and also in behalf of the dead. A place where the Lord may come, it is the most holy of any place of worship on the earth. Only the home can compare with the temple in sacredness.

Once a Mormon family starts dwelling in a home, a special prayer is given by the head of the family (or a close member of the church) asking for the residence to be a shelter against temptation, and dedicating the place to God as long as the family inhabits it.

Other venerated sites for Latter-day Saints include historical locations throughout the United States, due to their particular connection to Mormon history and theology. Examples include the Sacred Grove (Palmyra, New York), Cumorah, the Kirtland Temple (Kirtland, Ohio) and Adam-ondi-Ahman (Daviess County, Missouri). However, no mandatory ceremonies are performed in such places.

===== Other LDS movement sects =====
Mormon breakaway sects, sub-sects and fundamentalist groups sometimes hold the belief that their particular church alone can claim true authority and succession from Joseph Smith, and that other LDS denominations are therefore incorrect or heretical. Thus many sites throughout the United States represent the spiritual headquarters' of these churches: For example, the YFZ Ranch in Eldorado, Texas, at one time represented the Fundamentalist Church of Jesus Christ of Latter-day Saints (FLDS) and the Apostolic United Brethren (AUB) base themselves in Bluffdale, Utah.

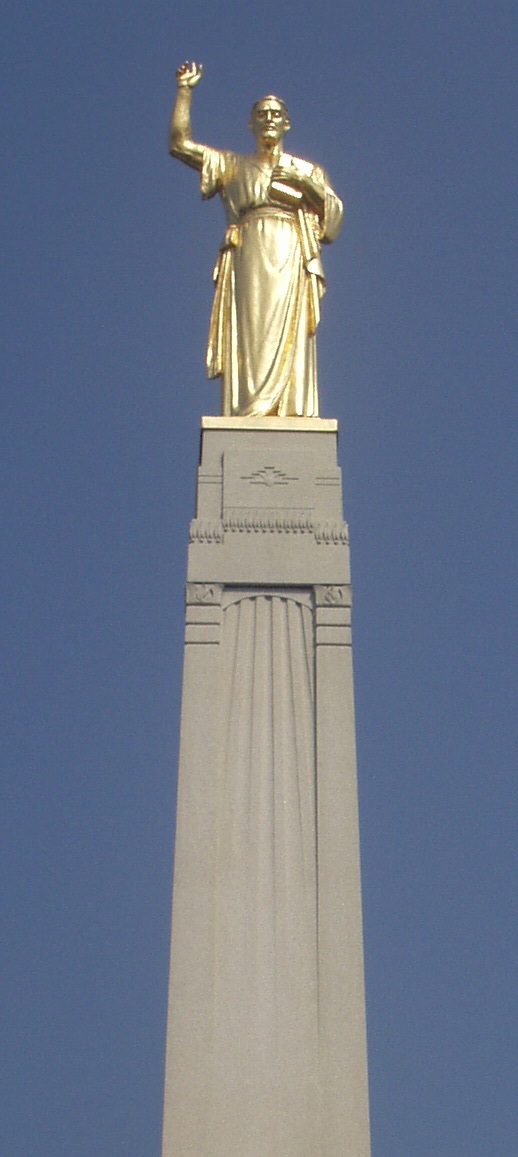
The Hill Cumorah Angel Moroni statue in 2005

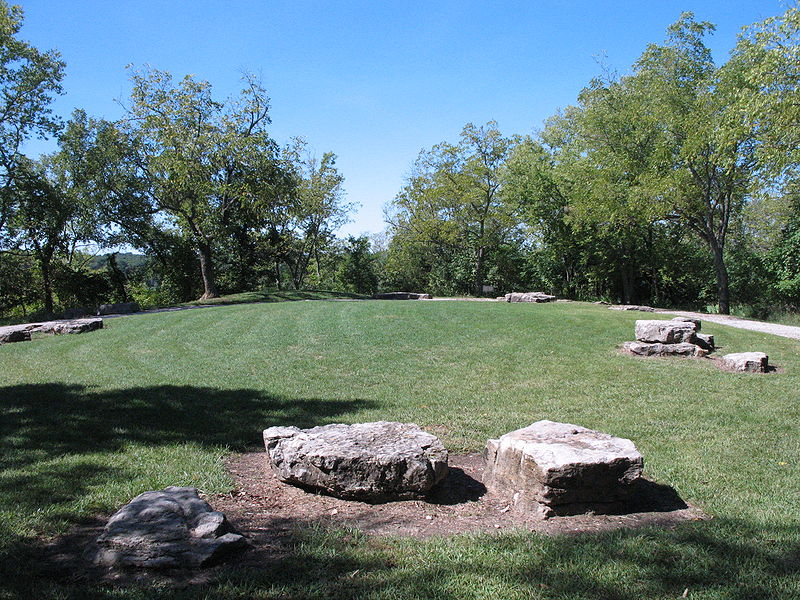
Adam-ondi-Ahman in Daviess County, Missouri, in 2011

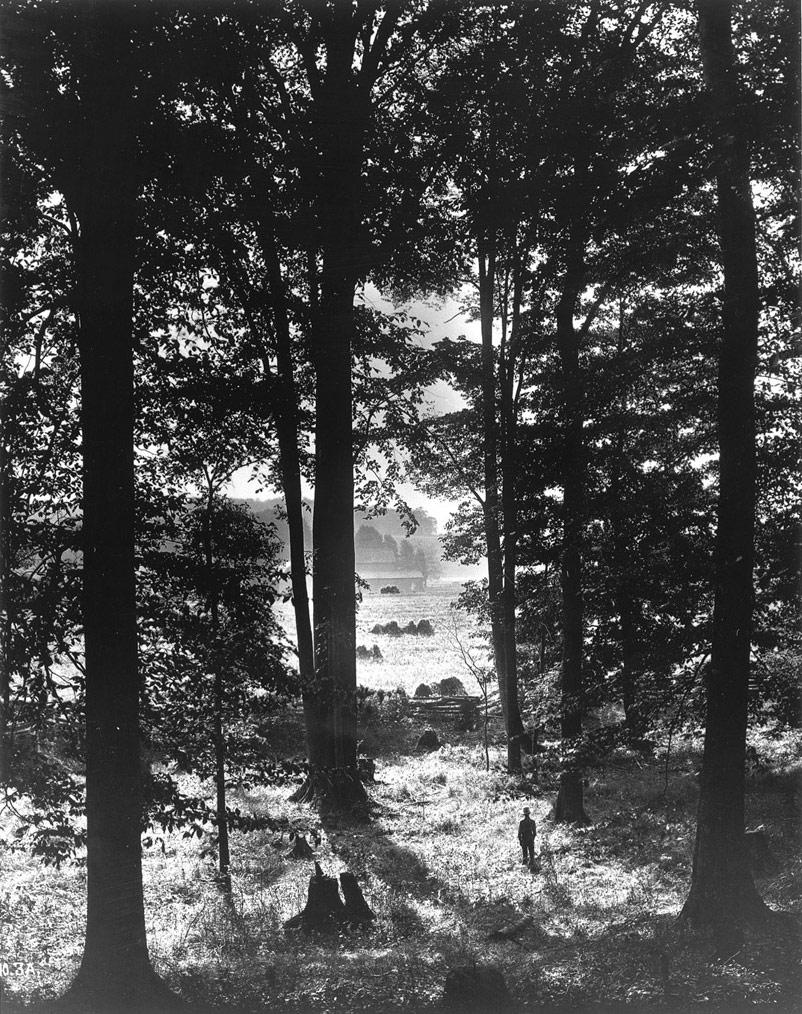
The Sacred Grove, where Joseph Smith experienced his first theophany, in 1907

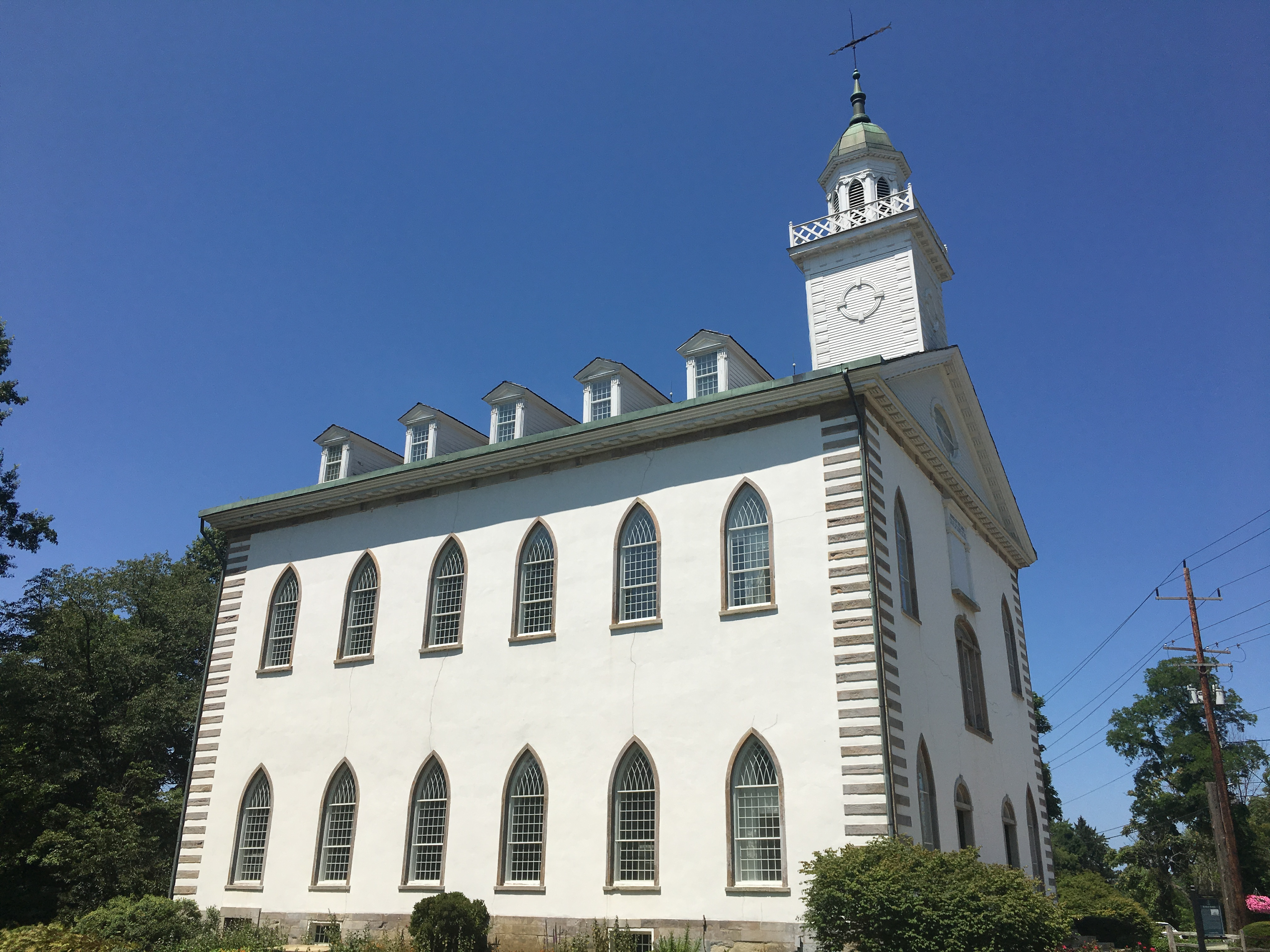
The Kirtland Temple in 2005

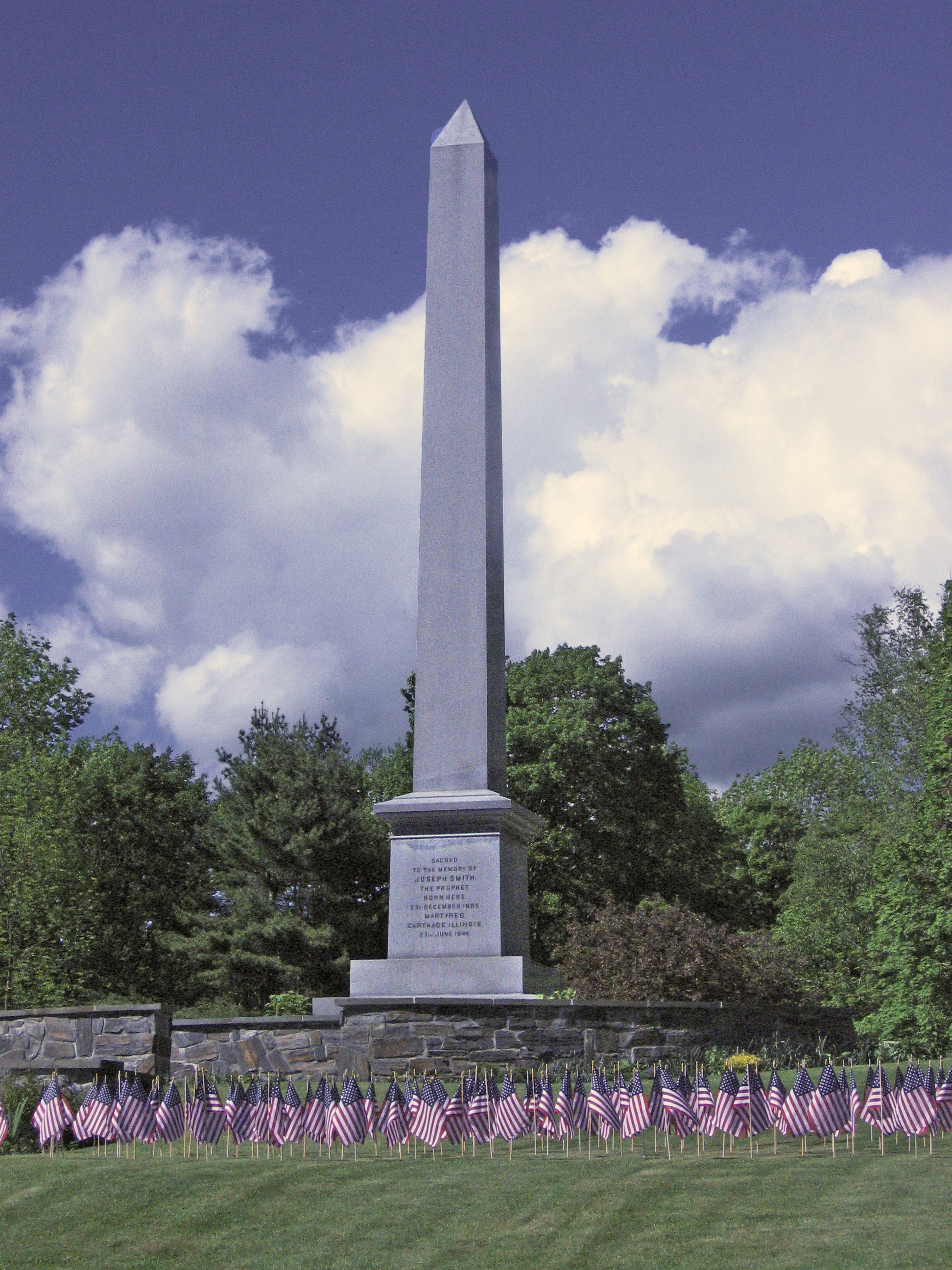
The Joseph Smith Birthplace Memorial in 2009

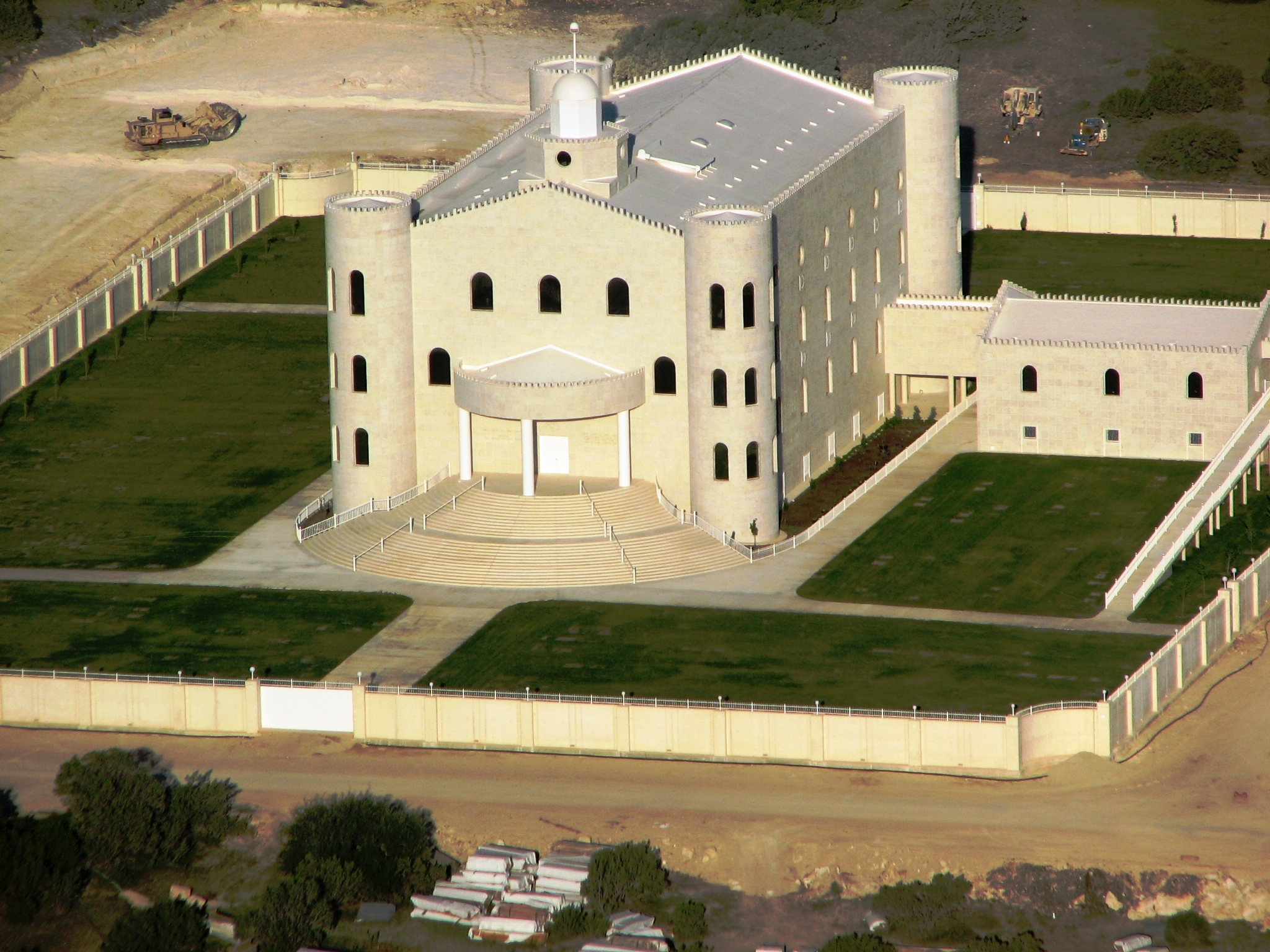
The main temple of the YFZ Ranch – FLDS Church in Eldorado, Texas, in 2006

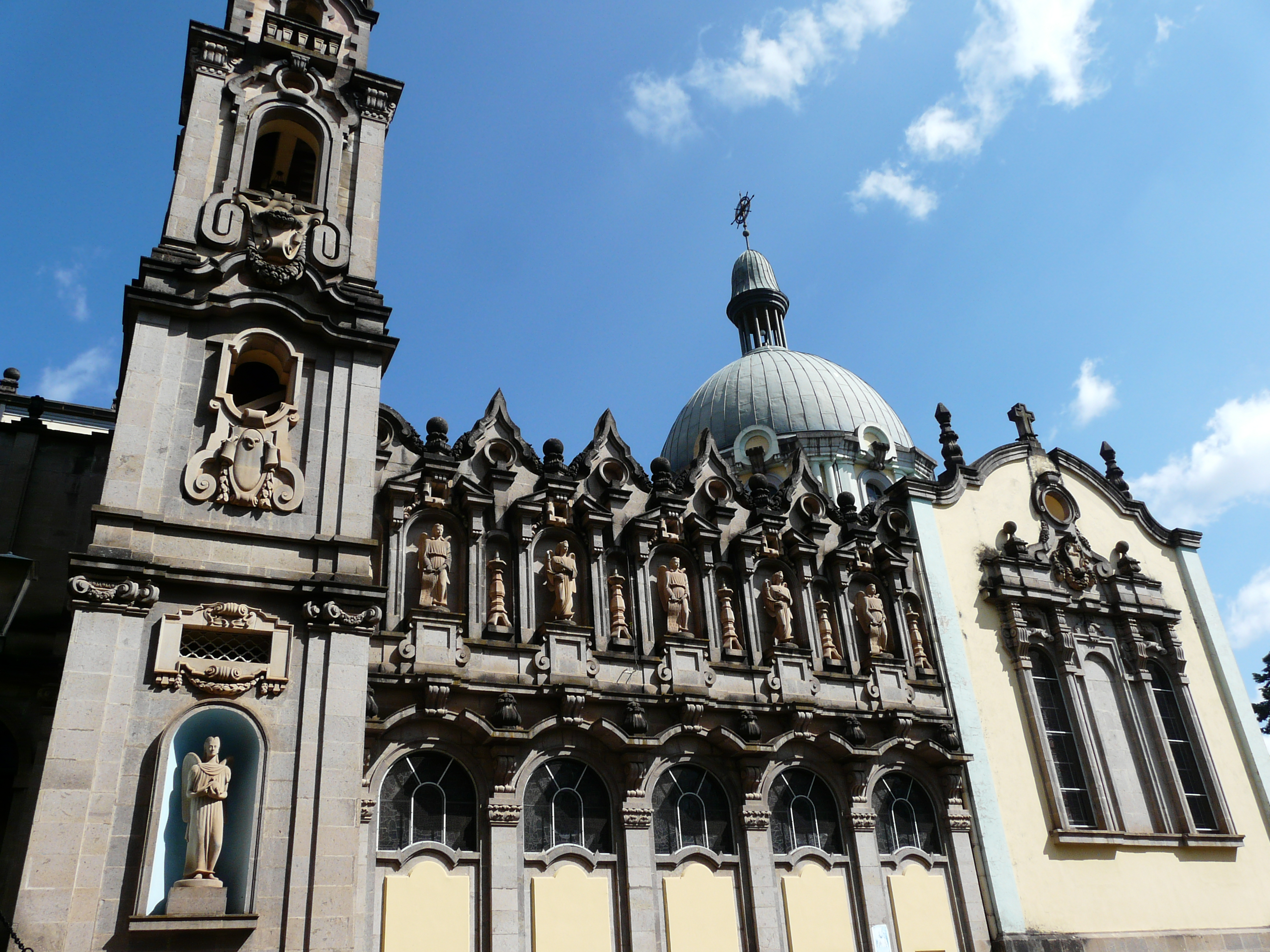
The Holy Trinity Cathedral in Addis Ababa, an Ethiopian Orthodox Tawahedo cathedral which is also the burial place of Haile Selassie I

==== Rastafari movement ====
Ethiopia is of considerable importance as the setting of the life and death of Haile Selassie. Many Rastas consider Ethiopia the Promised Land. The city of Shashamane is particularly significant. In the capital of Addis Ababa, Haile Selassie is buried in the Holy Trinity Cathedral (often called Kidist Selassie, from the Amharic), which is also a significant religious site for Ethiopian Orthodox Christians (see also Oriental Orthodox churches), as it doubles as the seat of the primate of their church.

=== Druze ===
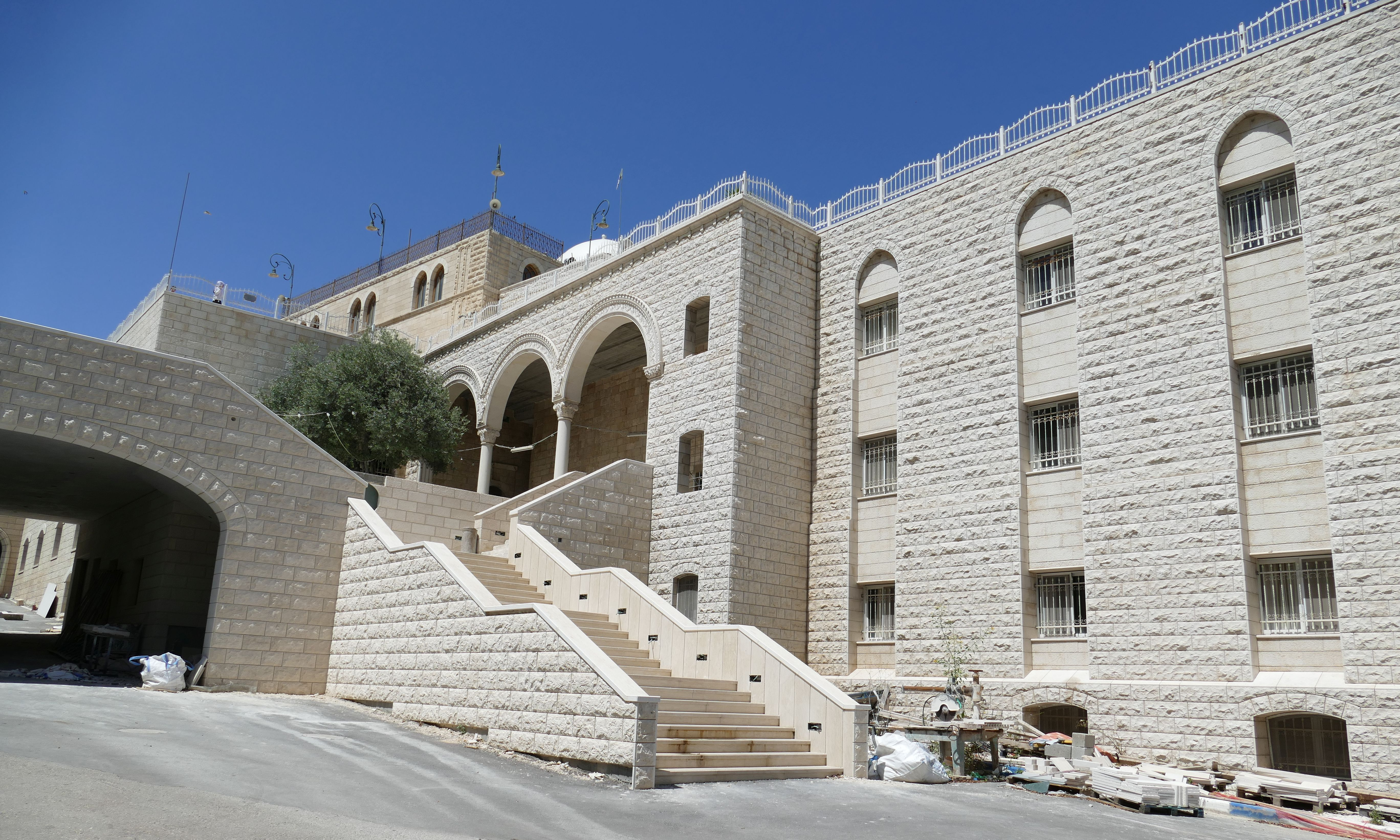
Jethro's Tomb in Tiberias, Israel

Druze is a religion with between 800,000 and a million followers. Most Druzis regard Nabi Shu'ayb, or Tomb of Jethro, near Tiberias in Israel is the most important religious site for the Druze. They have held religious festivals there for centuries and it has been a place of annual pilgrimage.

The primary sanctuary of the Druze is at Khalwat al-Bayada, which is the central sanctuary, and theological school of the Druze, located in Lebanon. Located near Hasbaya, the khalwat is the location where Ad-Darazi is supposed to have settled and taught from during the first Druze call. The Kalwaat provides around forty hermitages for Al-ʻuqqāl (the initiated) at various times of the year.

=== Islam ===
The Kaaba, a cuboid structure located within the Masjid al-Haram (Sacred Mosque) in Mecca, Saudi Arabia, is the holiest site of Islam. According to Islamic tradition, it was rebuilt by Ibrahim (Abraham) and his son Ismail (Ishmael). The Islamic prophet Muhammad laid the Black Stone in one of the corners of the building. Many millions of Muslims visit Mecca and the surrounding areas each year during a pilgrimage known as the Hajj – the fifth and final pillar of Islam – during which they circumambulate the Kaaba as part of the ritual.

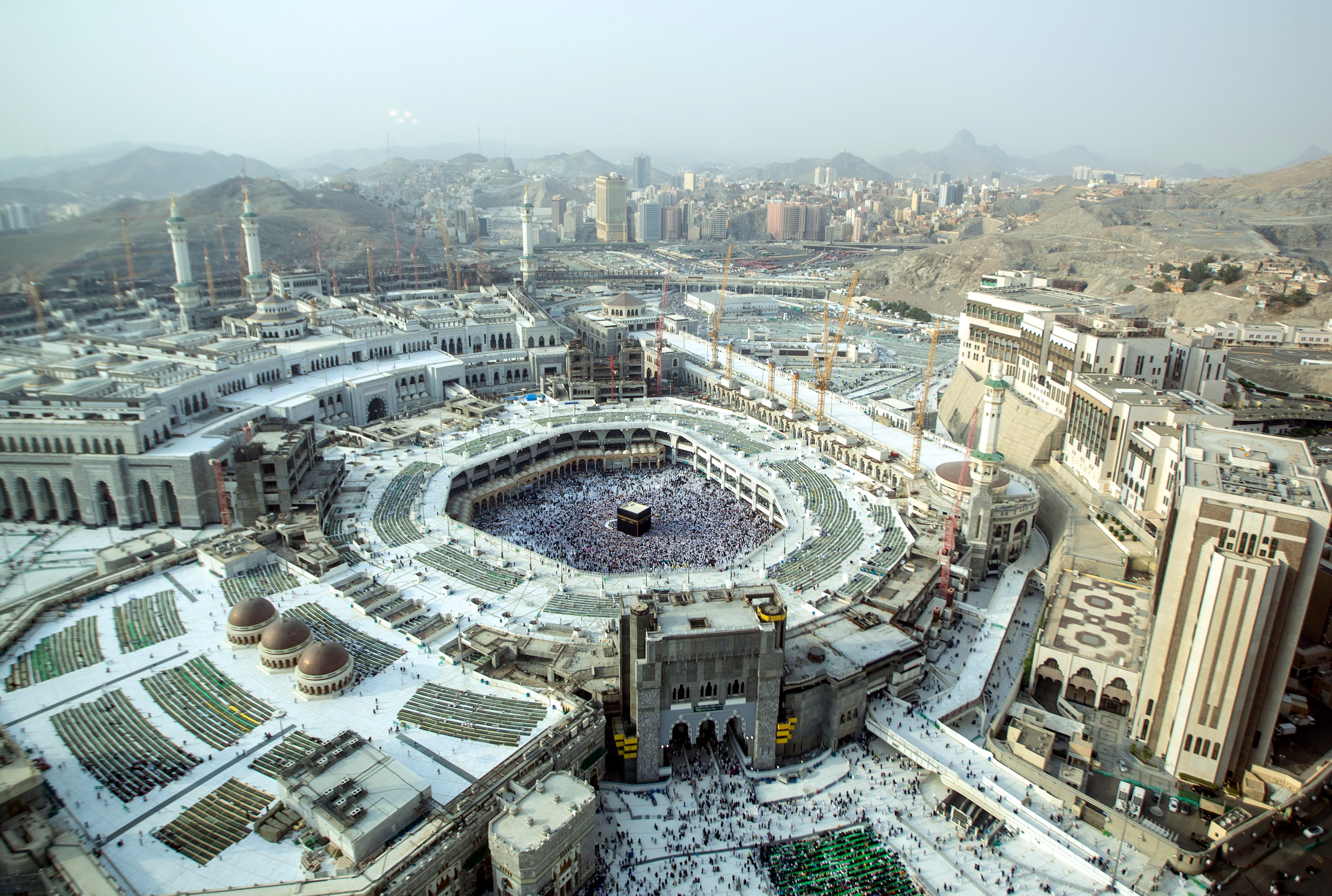
Great Mosque of Mecca

Other significant areas within or surrounding Mecca include areas in which the Hajj takes place, including the Well of Zamzam, Mina and its bridge, Muzdalifah and Mount Arafat.

Pilgrims circumambulating the Kaaba.

The second holiest place for Muslims is the Masjid al-Nabawi in Medina, which is where Muhammad is buried, under the Green Dome. Caliphs Umar and Abu Bakr are also said to be buried in the Masjid al-Nabawi.

The third holiest site in Islam is the Al-Aqsa Mosque compound in Jerusalem, which includes Jami Al-Aqsa and the Dome of the Rock. Its holiness derives from its being the historic Temple of Solomon (and therefore its association with various prophets which preceded Muhammad); the site from which Muhammad ascended to heaven in the Isra and Mi'raj; and also for having been the first qibla. It is mentioned as "the Farthest Mosque" (al-masjid al-aqsa) in Surah al-Isra' in the Qur'an (also called Surah Bani Isra'il), in discussion of Muhammad's Night Journey (isra') to Jerusalem, and thereon Ascension (mi'raj) to Heaven. Prior to the Islamic conquest of Jerusalem, the Temple Mount had been occupied by the ruins of a Roman temple to Jupiter. Following the Islamic conquest of Jerusalem, the Rashidun caliph Umar constructed the Dome of the Rock over the eponymous Foundation Stone in symbolic restoration of the Solomonic Temple and commemorating Islam as the final iteration of the Abrahamic prophetic tradition. The Pact of Umar and Umar's Assurance are two documents concerning the Rashidun governance of Jerusalem and its Abrahamic non-Muslim subjects, extending to them the status of dhimmi. While the authenticity of these specific documents are disputed, the general terms of tolerance under dhimmi status are broadly consistent with the historical record. While these documents only mention Christians specifically, these terms extended to Jews as well, who had heretofore been expelled from Jerusalem by the Romans, and were permitted by Umar to return to Jerusalem.

The Umayyad Mosque in Damascus, Syria, is claimed by some to be the fourth holiest site in Islam, and many Muslims believe it to be the place where Jesus will return.

The city of Hebron, in Palestine, is traditionally considered – along with Mecca, Medina and Jerusalem – one of the "four holy cities" in Islam, due to the presence in the city of the Cave of the Patriarchs, the holy site where Abraham is said to be buried.

Mount Sinai, in Egypt, is another holy place for Muslims.

Other sites in the Arabian Hejaz are associated with Muhammad: near Mecca, on the mountain of Jabal al-Nour, the cave Hira is the place of Muhammad's first revelation.

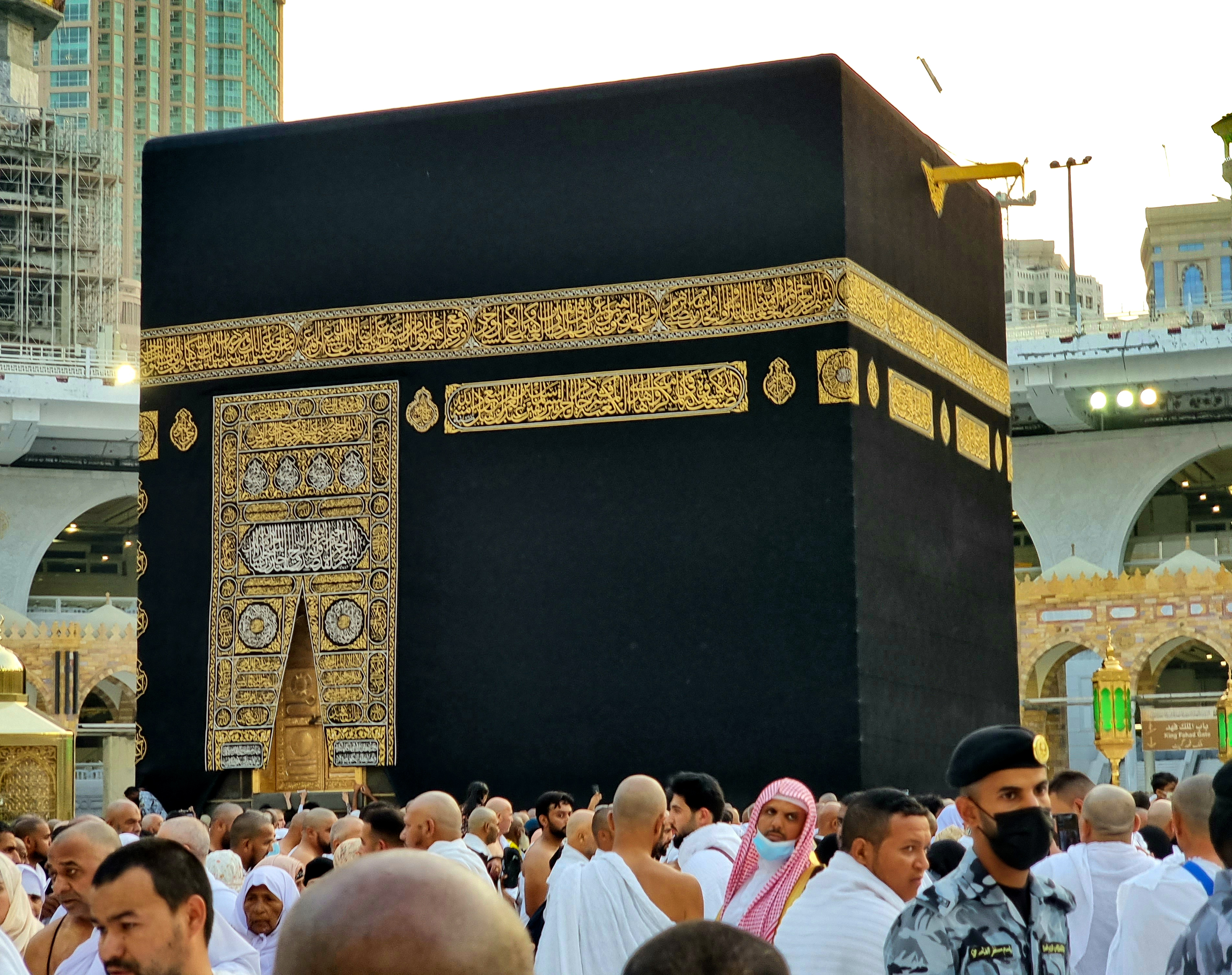
Kaaba at Masjid al-Haram in Mecca

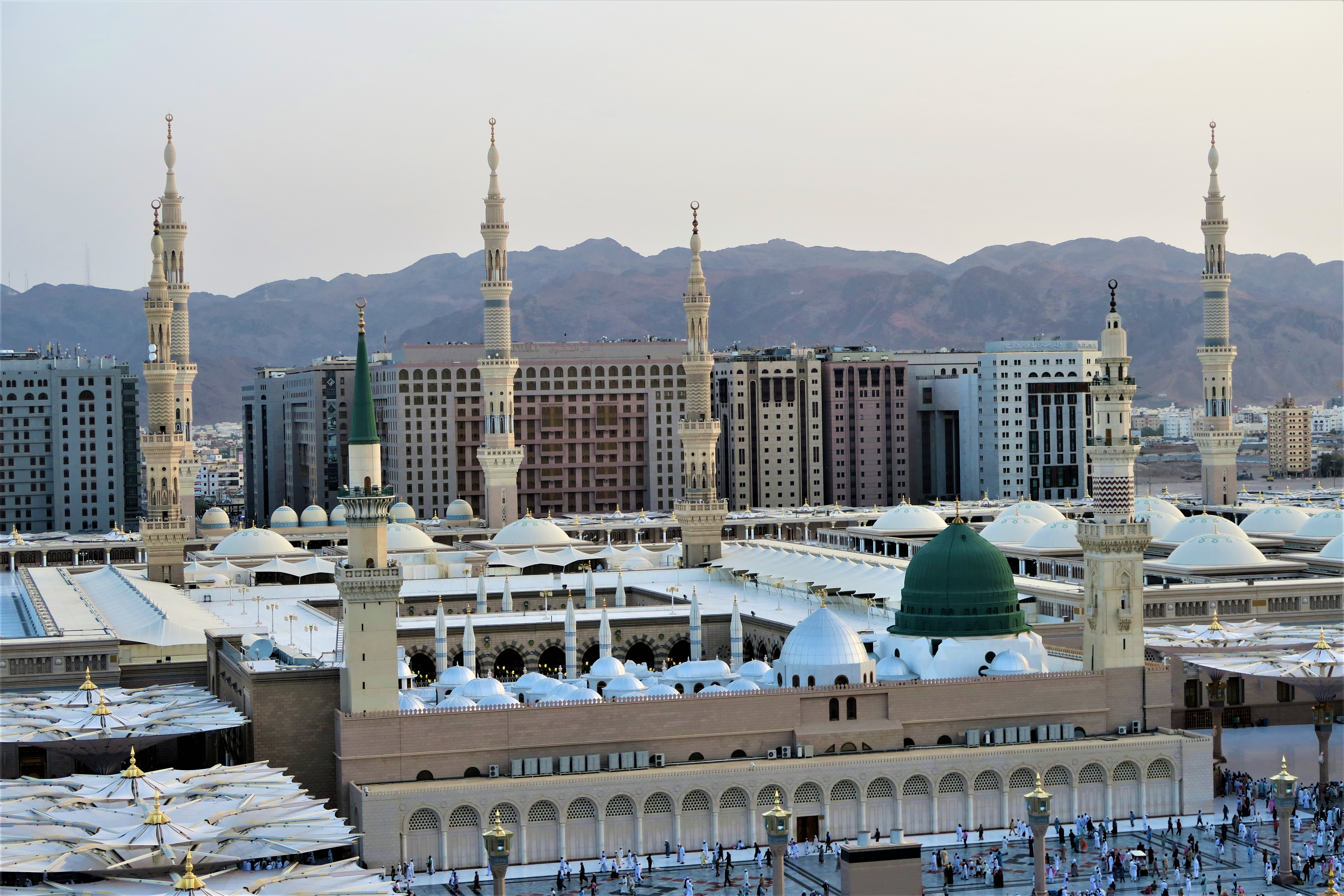
Masjid al-Nabawi. Muhammad's tomb is located beneath the Green Dome.

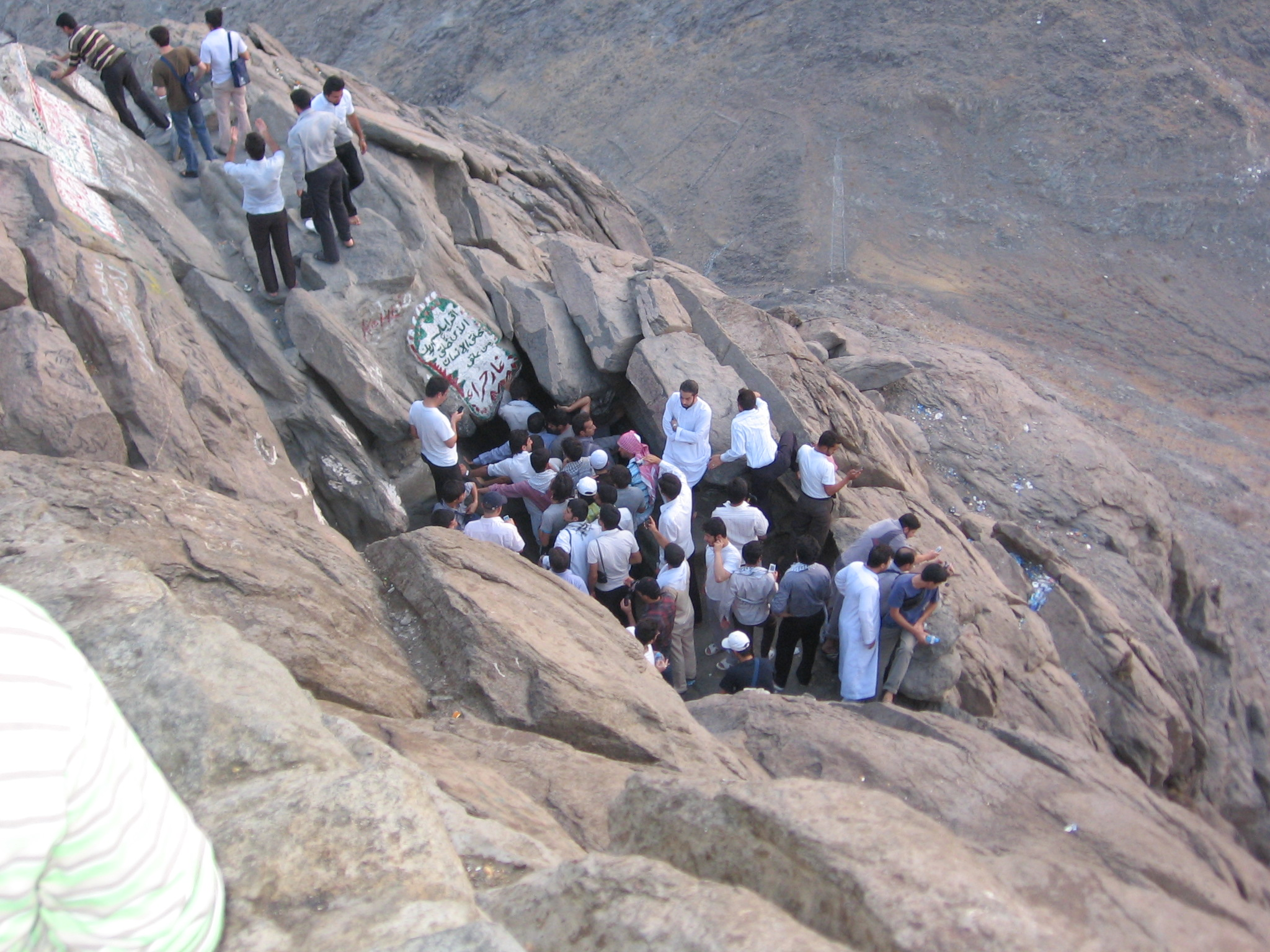
The cave of Hira on Jabal al-Nour

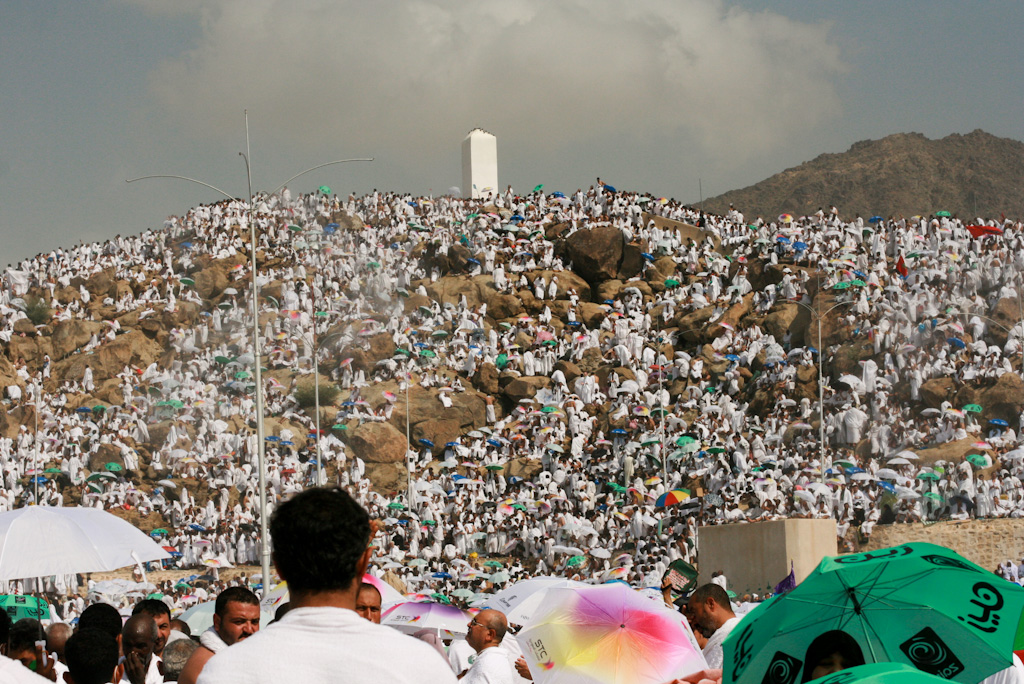
Mount Arafat during the Hajj

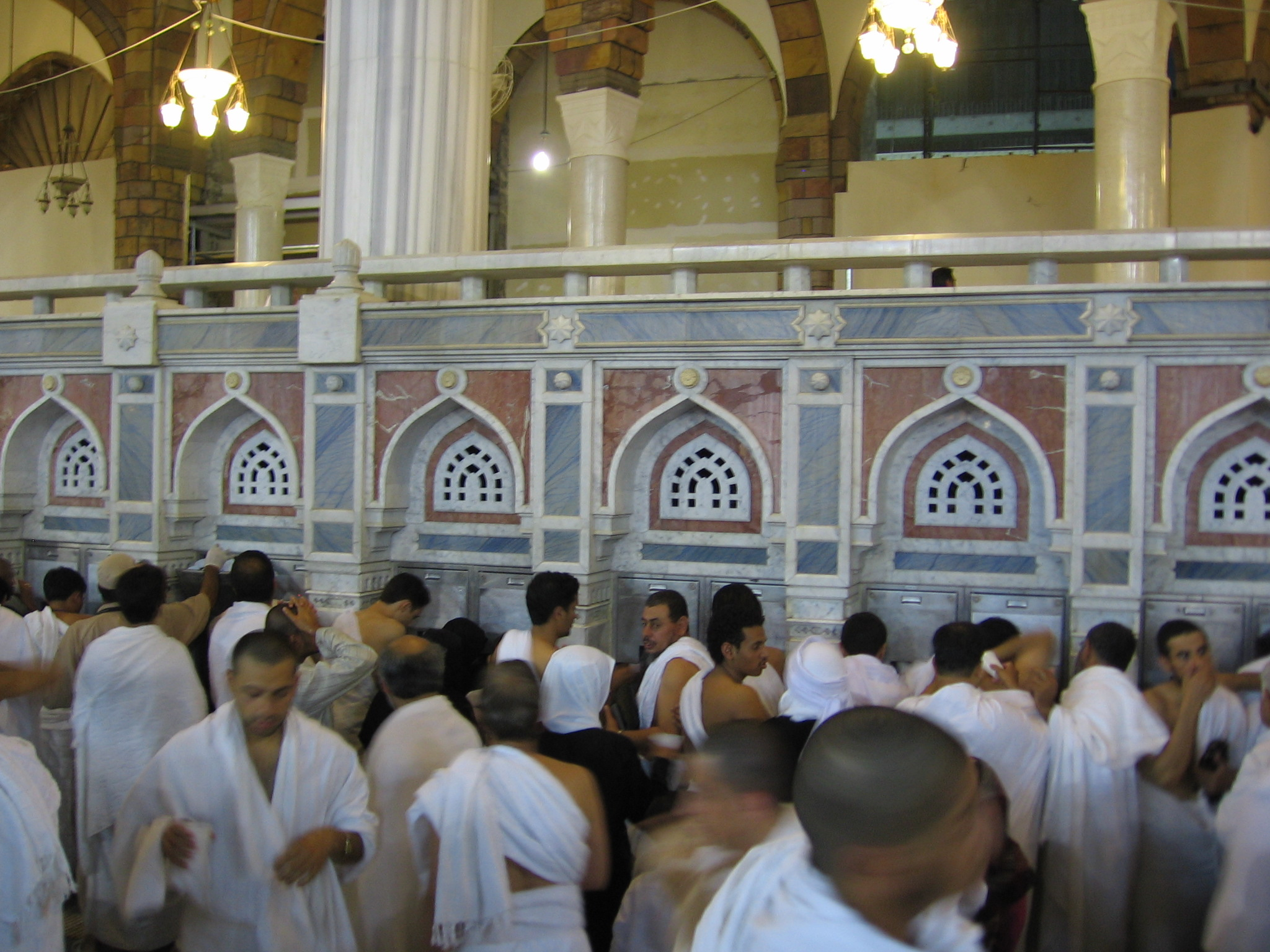
Pilgrims at the Well of Zamzam

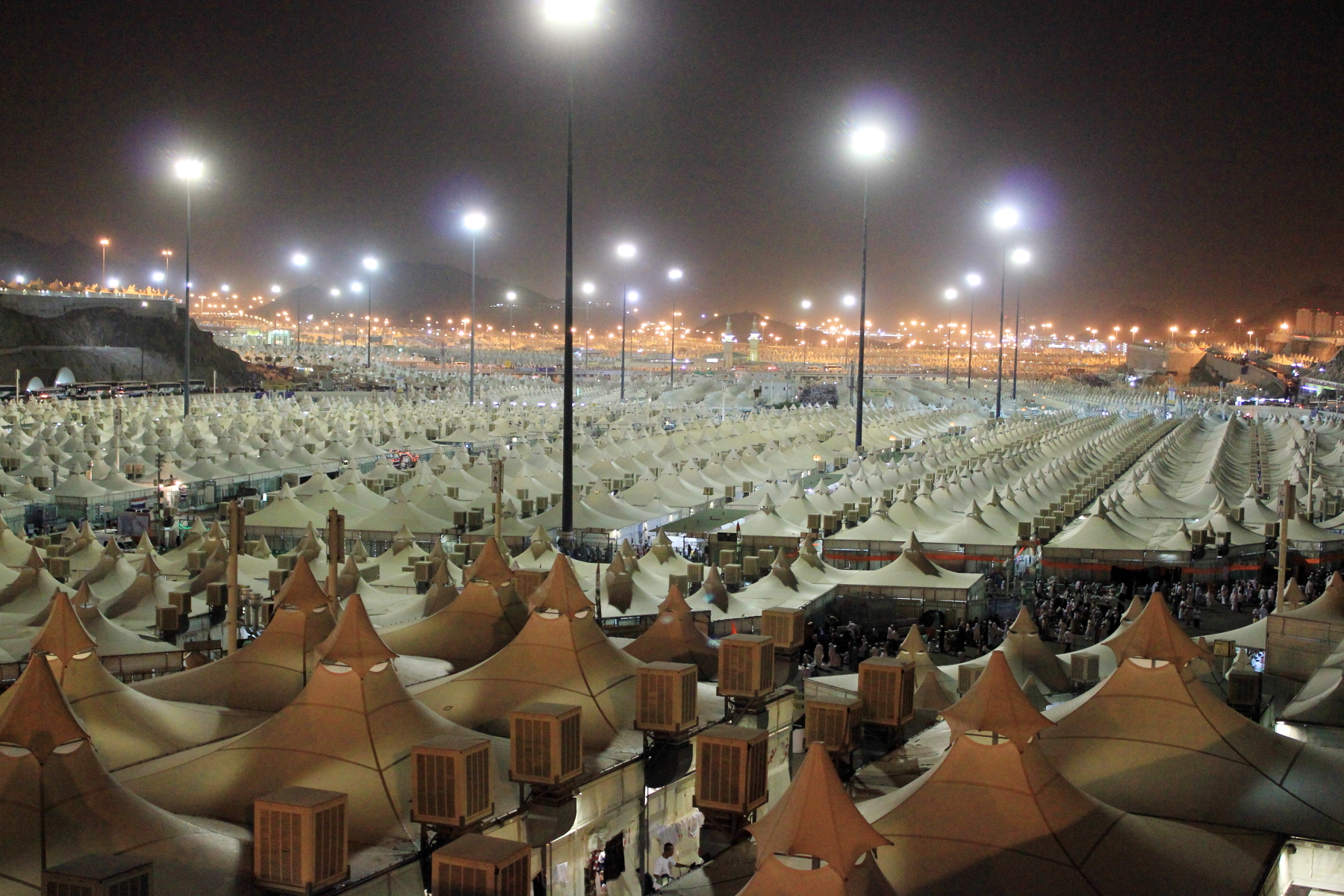
Hajji tents at Mina

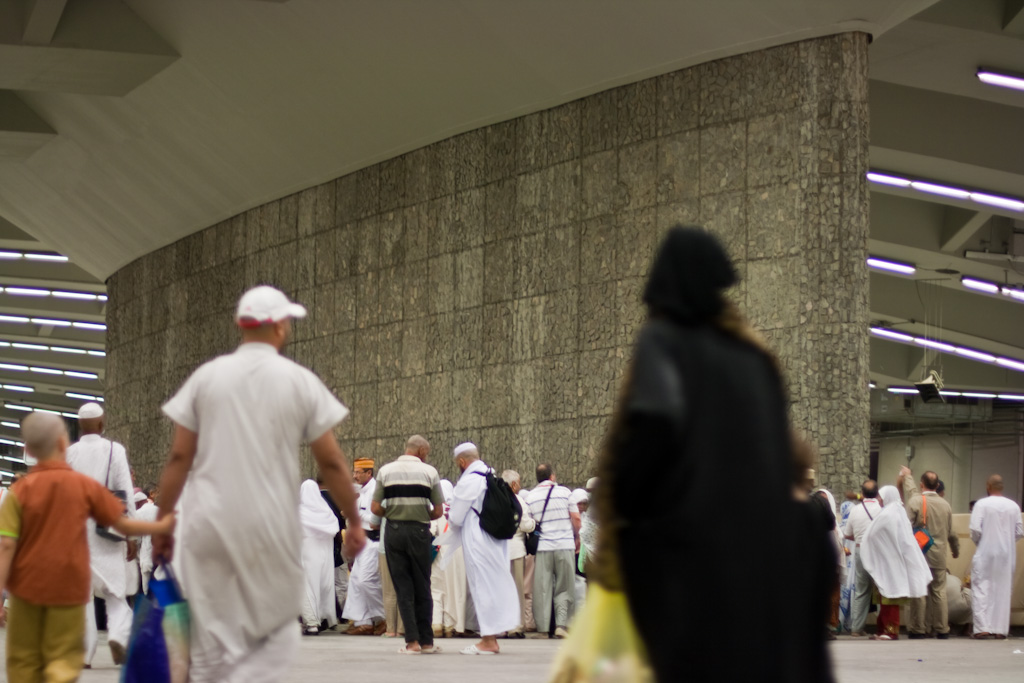
The Stoning of the Devil at Jamaraat Bridge

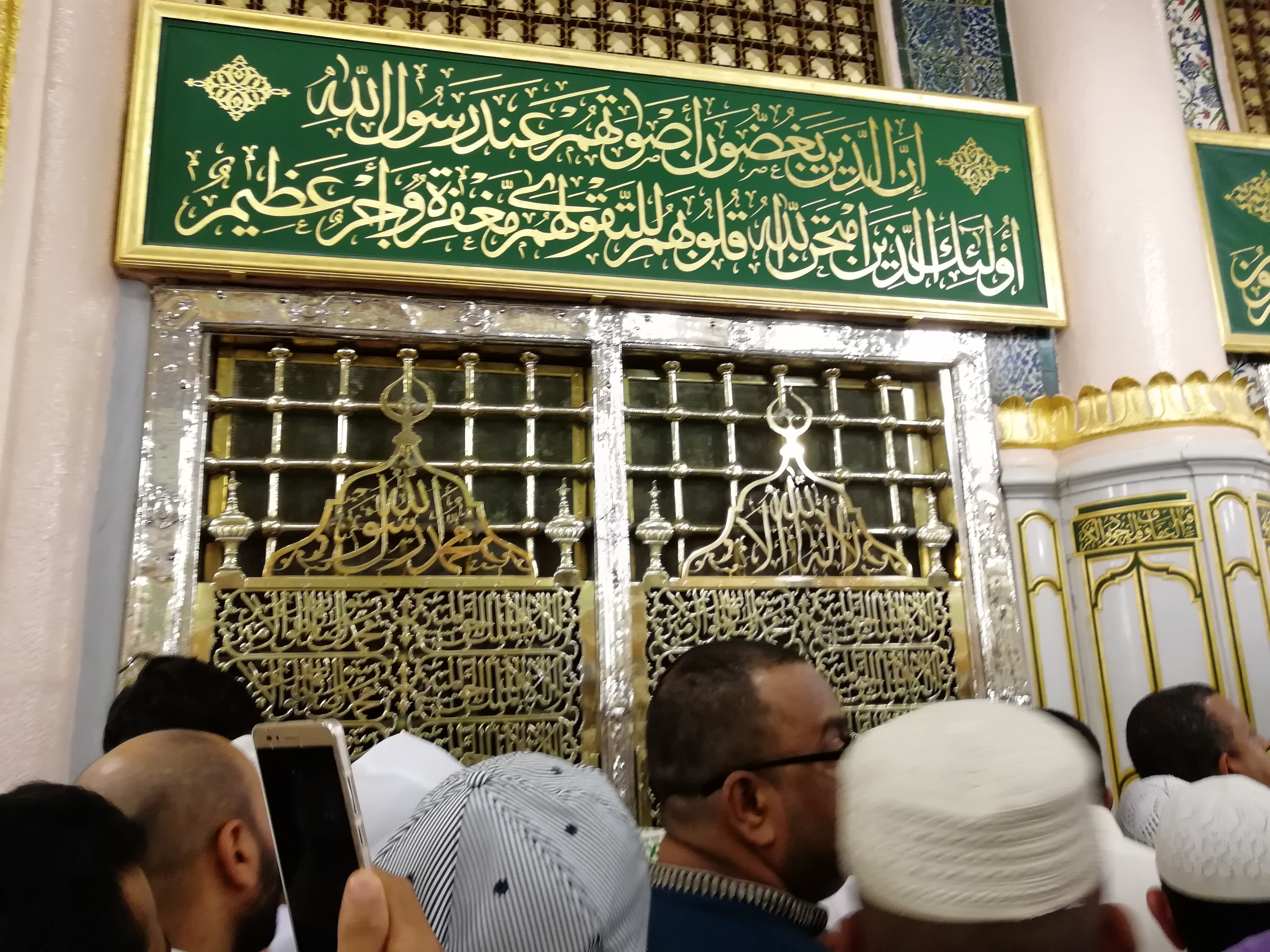
Muhammad's tomb

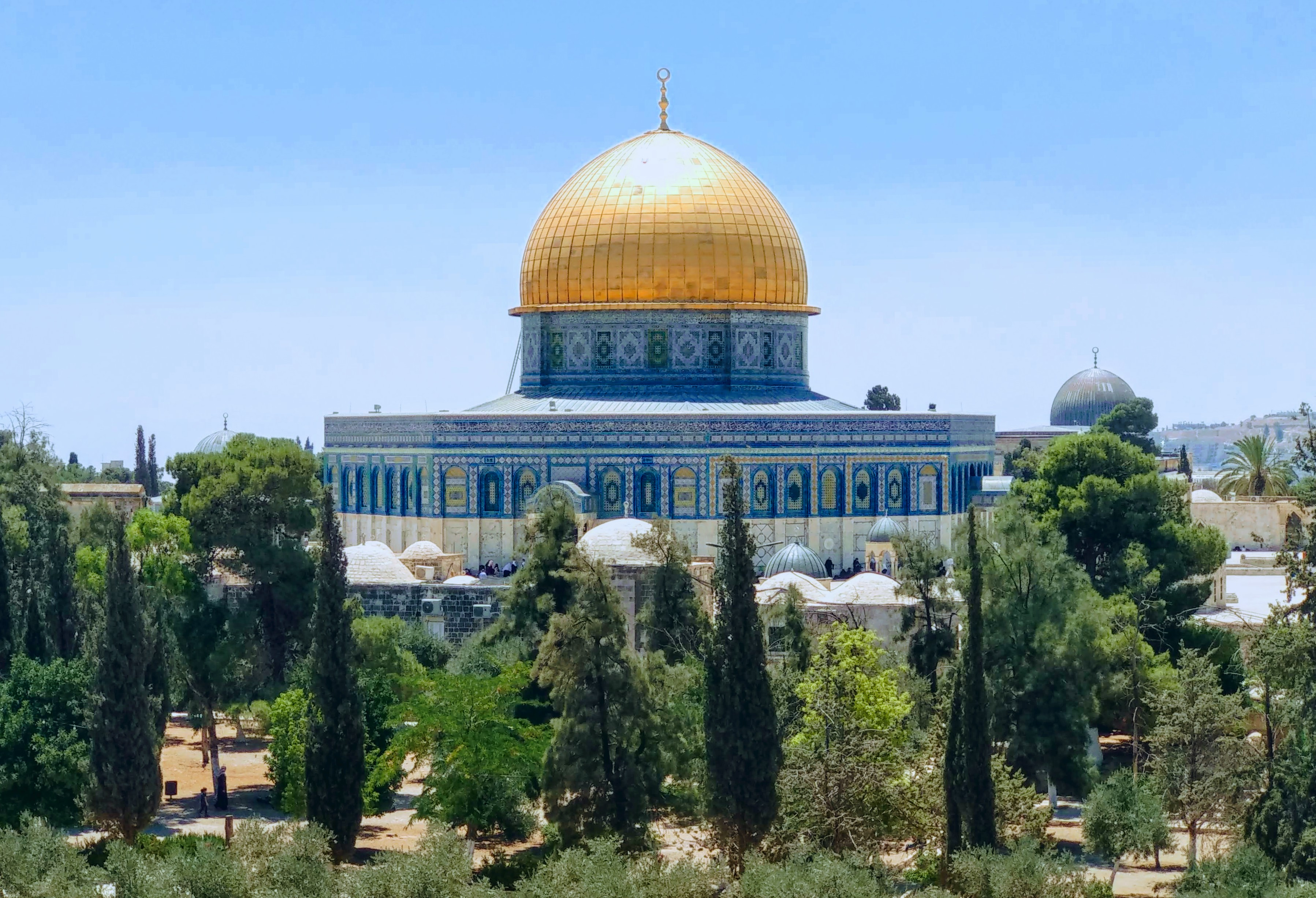
The Dome of the Rock in Jerusalem, part of the Al-Aqsa Mosque compound, the third holiest site in Islam

==== Shia ====
In addition to the sites revered by all Muslims, there are sites which are especially important to Shia Muslims. While Sunni Muslims may also hold these sites in esteem and make visitation to them, Shia Islam grants them particular significance. Many of these are the tombs of the Shia Imams and their relatives. In Iraq, the Imam Ali Shrine at Najaf, the Al-Askari Shrine at Samarra, and the Imam Husayn Shrine at Karbala are among these. In Iran, the Imam Reza Shrine in Mashhad, the Fatima Masumeh Shrine in Qom, the Shah-e-Cheragh Shrine in Shiraz, and the Imamzadeh Ismail and Shayah Mosque at Isfahan are some of the most significant Shia holy sites. Other significant Shia shrines and holy sites include the Sayyida Ruqayya Mosque in Damascus, Syria. Zaynab ibn Ali, one of the granddaughters of Ali, is also a significant figure, but it is disputed whether her grave is at her shrine in Cairo or in Damascus.

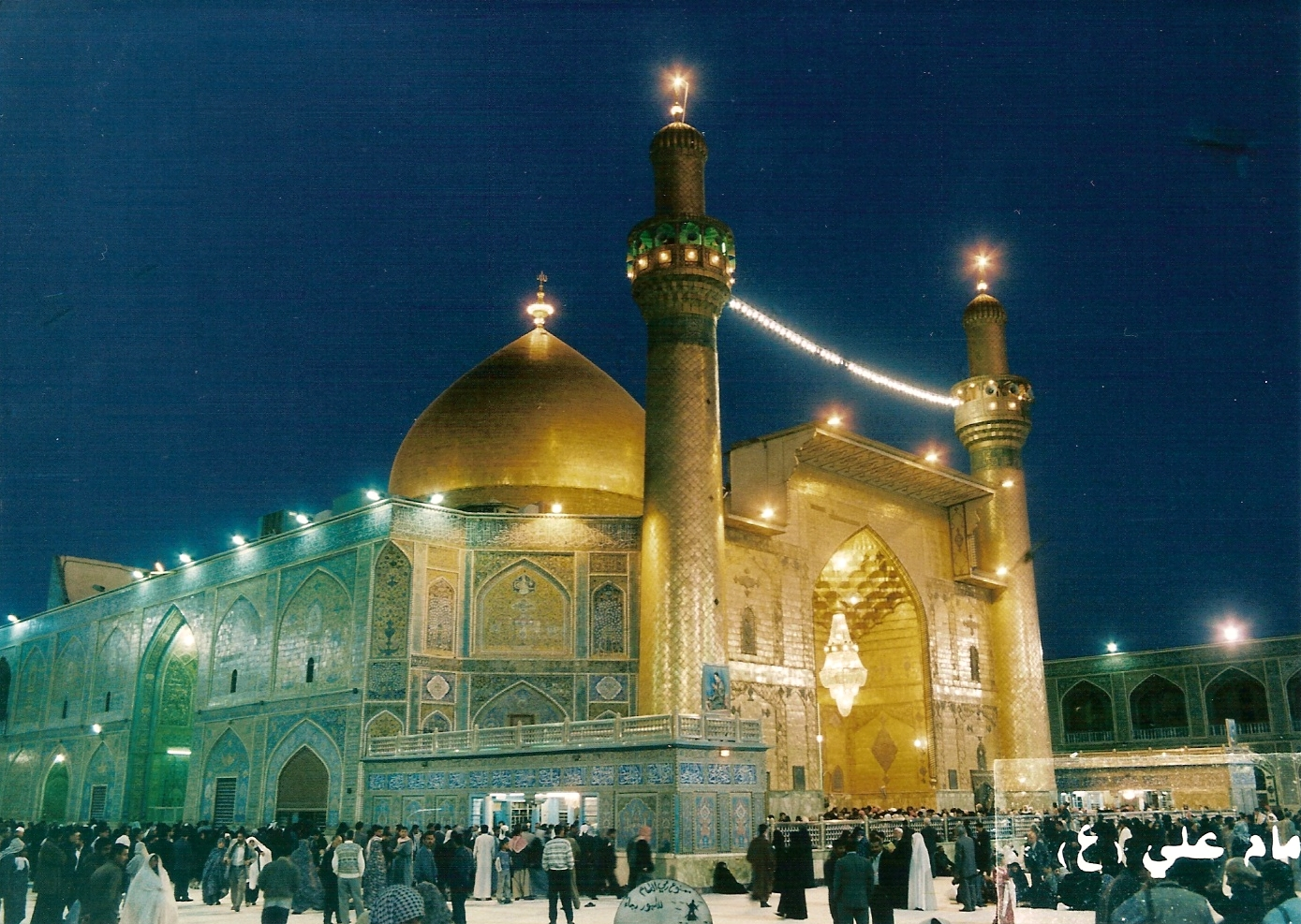
Imam Ali Mosque in Najaf

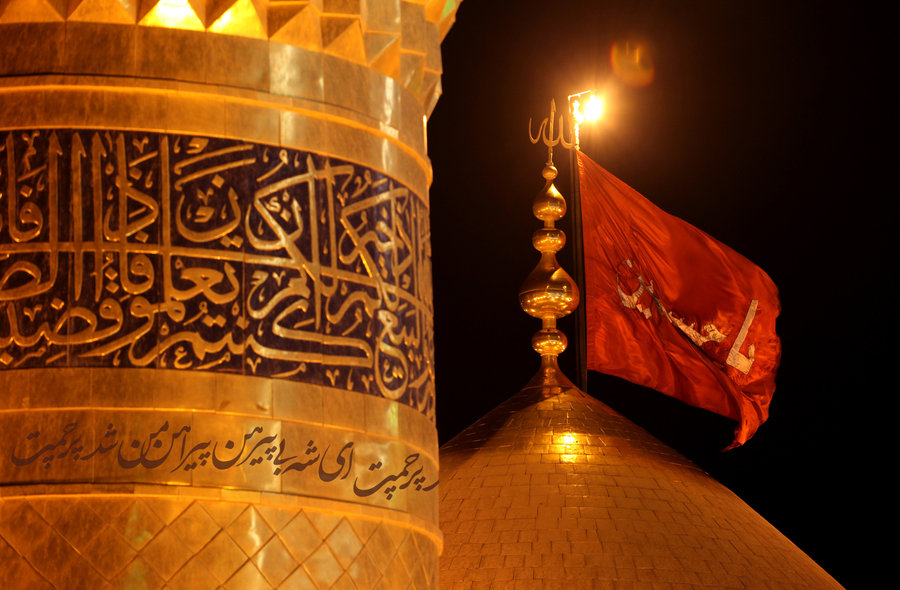
Imam Husayn Shrine in Karbala

==== Nation of Islam ====
Mosque Maryam is the international headquarters of the Nation of Islam.

===== Five Percent Nation =====
Five Percenters regard the Harlem neighborhood of Manhattan in New York City as a place of spiritual importance, referring to the neighborhood as "Mecca". They also refer to the Brooklyn borough of New York as "Medina".

Five Percenters hold a special annual event known as Show and Prove every June at the Harriet Tubman Elementary School in Harlem.

==== Ahmadiyya ====
Some individuals in the Ahmadiyya Muslim community regard Roza Bal in Srinagar, Kashmir, to be the authentic grave of Jesus.

=== Judaism ===
Map of the Jewish Quarter of Jerusalem

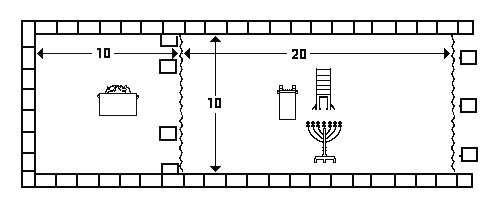
A modern diagram of the Kodesh Hakodashim, or the tabernacle at Solomon's Temple

The Kodesh Hakodashim, Judaism's Holy of Holies, was the inner sanctuary of the Tabernacle in the time of Moses as described in the Torah; the term now refers to the area on the Temple Mount in Jerusalem where this sanctuary was located within the Temple in Jerusalem. Its location is often, but controversially, identified as being inaccessible, within the footprint of the Islamic Dome of the Rock, while some Jewish authors claim the Holy of Holies was actually located either to the north or to the east of the Islamic shrine.

Historically, the area of the Holy of Holies, which sat within the Jewish Temple, could be entered by the Jewish High Priest and only once a year, on Yom Kippur. Orthodox Judaism and Conservative Judaism continue to regard the location as retaining some or all of its sanctity despite the destruction of the Temple in 70 CE. Entry into sanctified areas has been prohibited in recent times by powerful elements within traditional Judaism, and as a result many religious authorities prohibit or restrict entry into all areas of the Temple Mount by observant Jews.

Today, Jews recognize the Jewish Quarter of the city, wherein the Mount is located, to be a location of profound spiritual importance. Within the area a stone artifact known as the Western Wall is paramount as the last standing remains of the temple. Along the wall, notable features include the Western Stone and Wilson's Arch. Beneath it a tunnel runs closer toward what was the original Kodesh Hakodashim, ending approximately 150 ft. inward at a place called Warren's Gate.

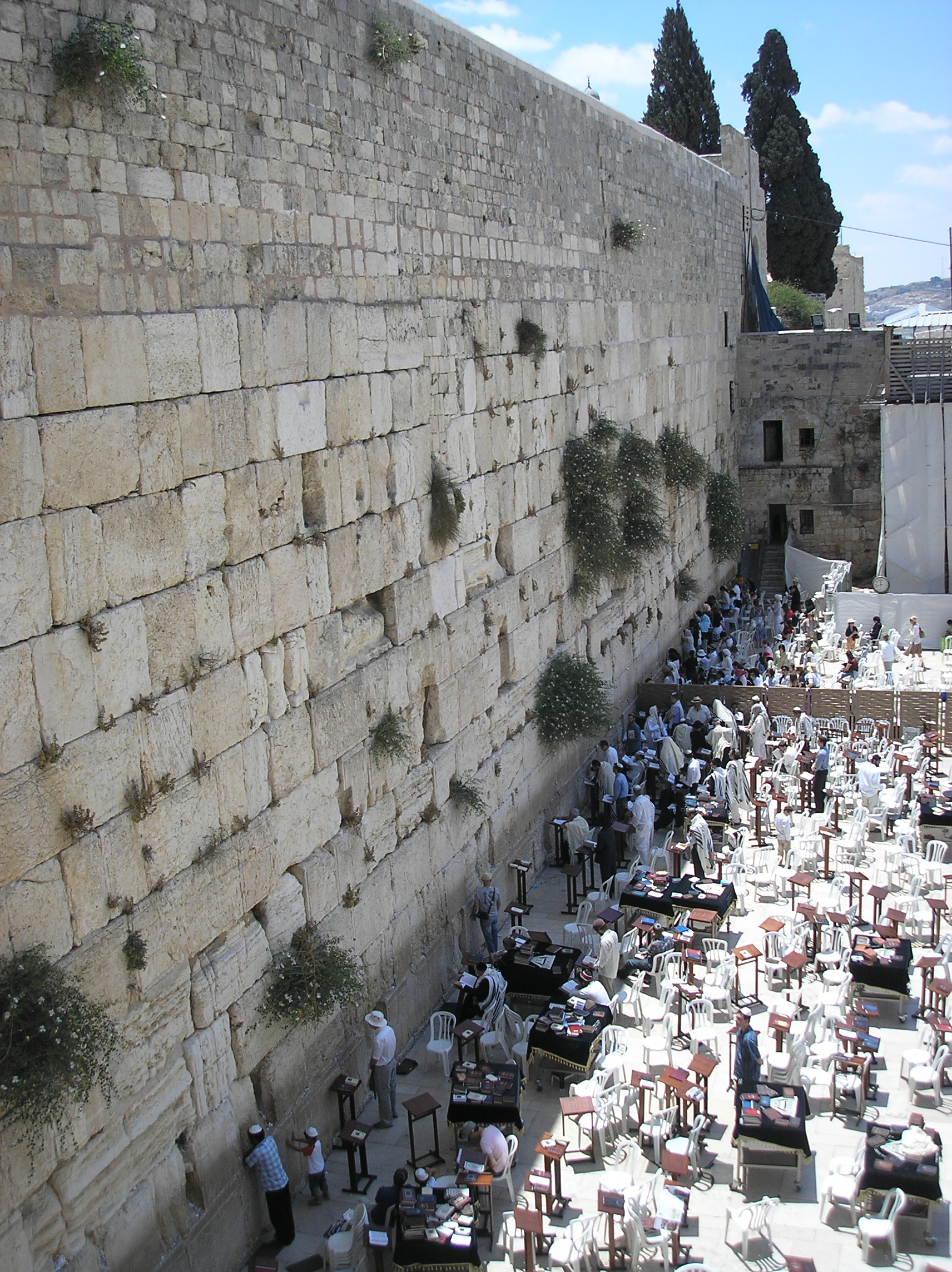
Aerial view of the Western Wall in 2008

The Cave of the Patriarchs in Hebron is said to be the second holiest site in Judaism.

Other significant sites include a number of synagogue within the Jewish quarter of Old Jerusalem, namely the Hurva, Belz, Tiferet Yisrael and the Four Sephardic synagogues.

The Beit El Synagogue is of special importance to students of Kaballah.

The Biblical Mount Sinai is believed to be the place where Moses received the Ten Commandments from God – although there is considerable debate as to the location of the mountain. (Scholarly opinion places it at either the mountain historically known as "Sinai" or Mount Seir.)

=== Samaritanism ===
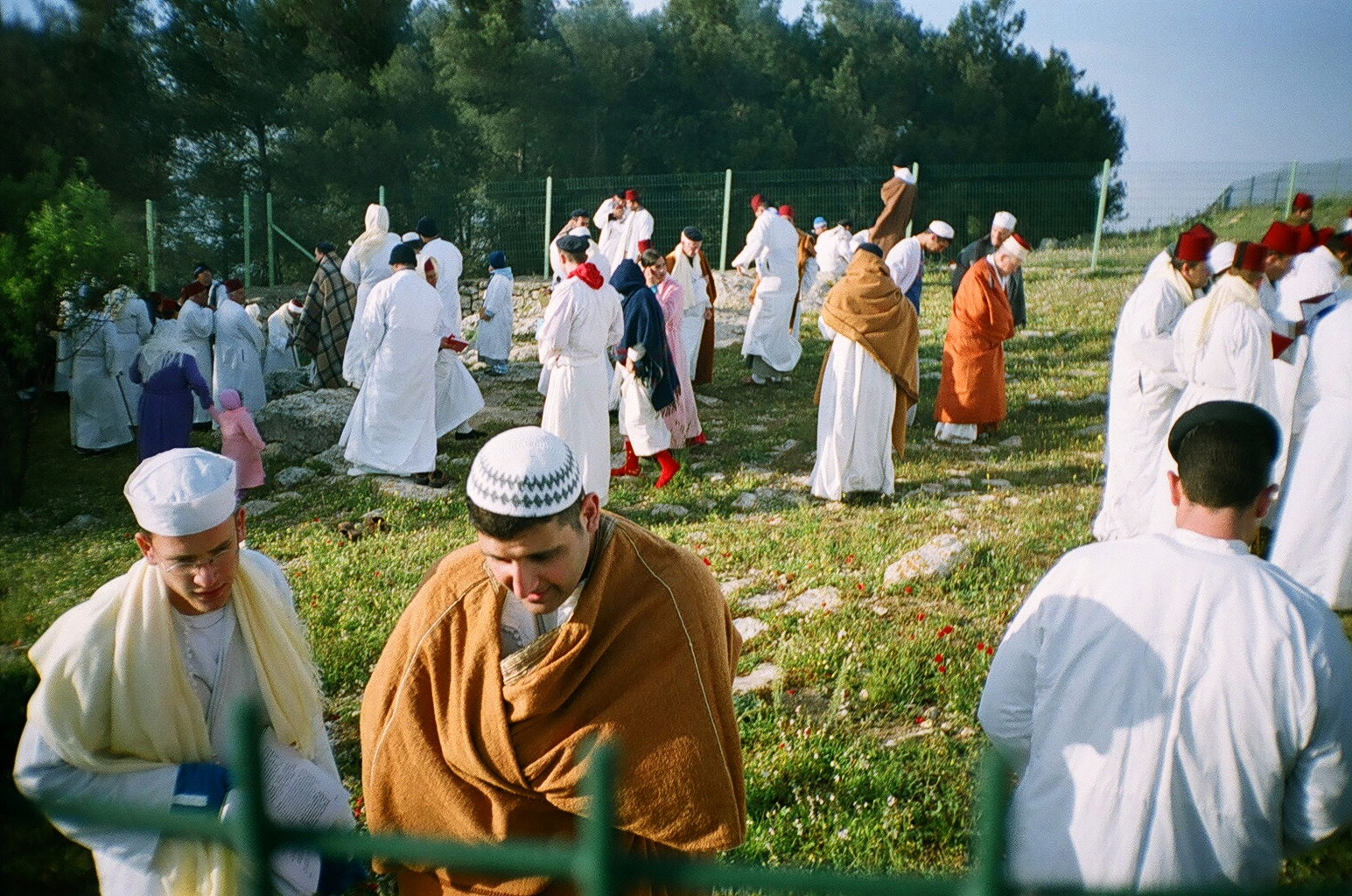
Samaritans atop Mount Gerizim in 2006

Samaritanism is an Abrahamic religion whose followers, like the Jews, claim descent from the Israelites. The Samaritan ethnoreligious group (Hebrew: שומרונים Shomronim, Arabic: السامريون as-Sāmariyyūn) mostly resides in the areas of present-day Israel and Palestine and claim to be the successors of the Israelite Northern Kingdom of Samaria. Samaritans consider Mount Gerizim (Samaritan Hebrew: Ar-garízim, Arabic: جبل جرزيم Jabal Jarizīm, T.H.: הַר גְּרִזִּים Har Gərizzîm, S.H.: הַר גְּרִיזִּים Har Gərizzim; also romanized as Jirziem), a mountain in the immediately know vicinity of Nablus, in the West Bank, the holiest place on Earth. Mount Gerizim therefore has to Samaritans a role comparable to that the Temple Mount of Jerusalem has to Judaism.

== Dharmic religions ==
=== Buddhism ===
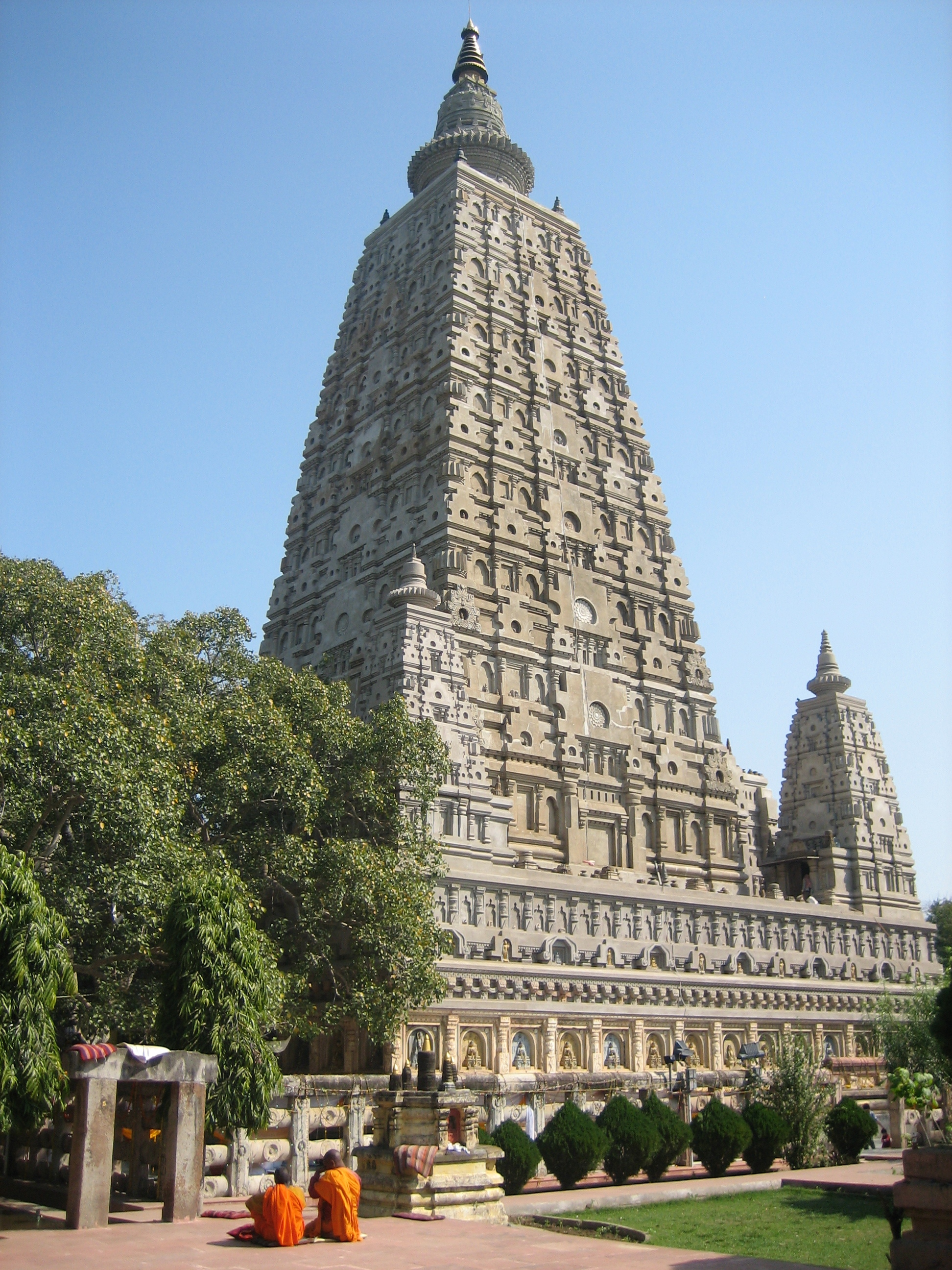
The Mahabodhi Temple is an important Buddhist pilgrimage site.

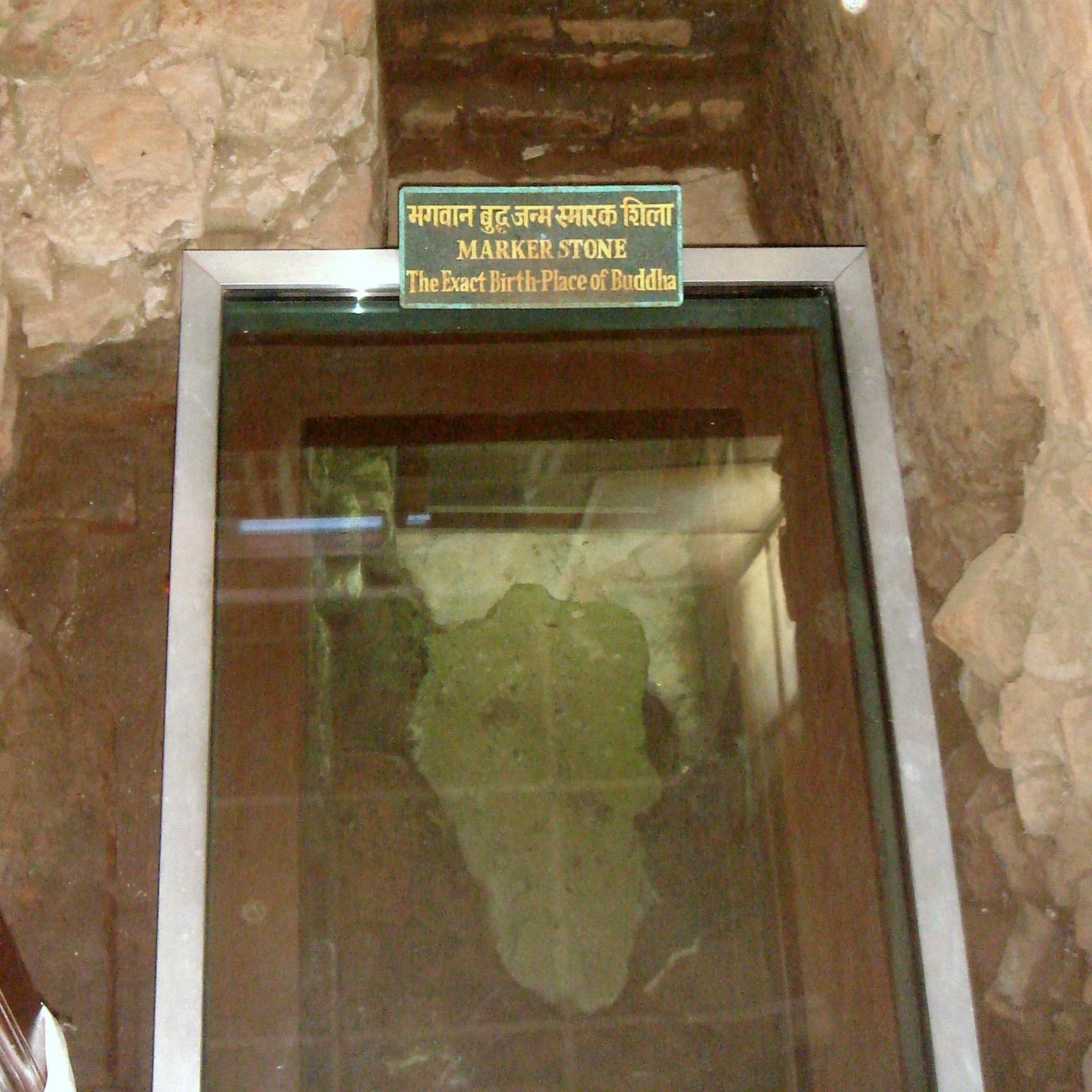
Purported birthplace of the Buddha in Lumbini, Nepal, a holy shrine also for many non-Buddhists

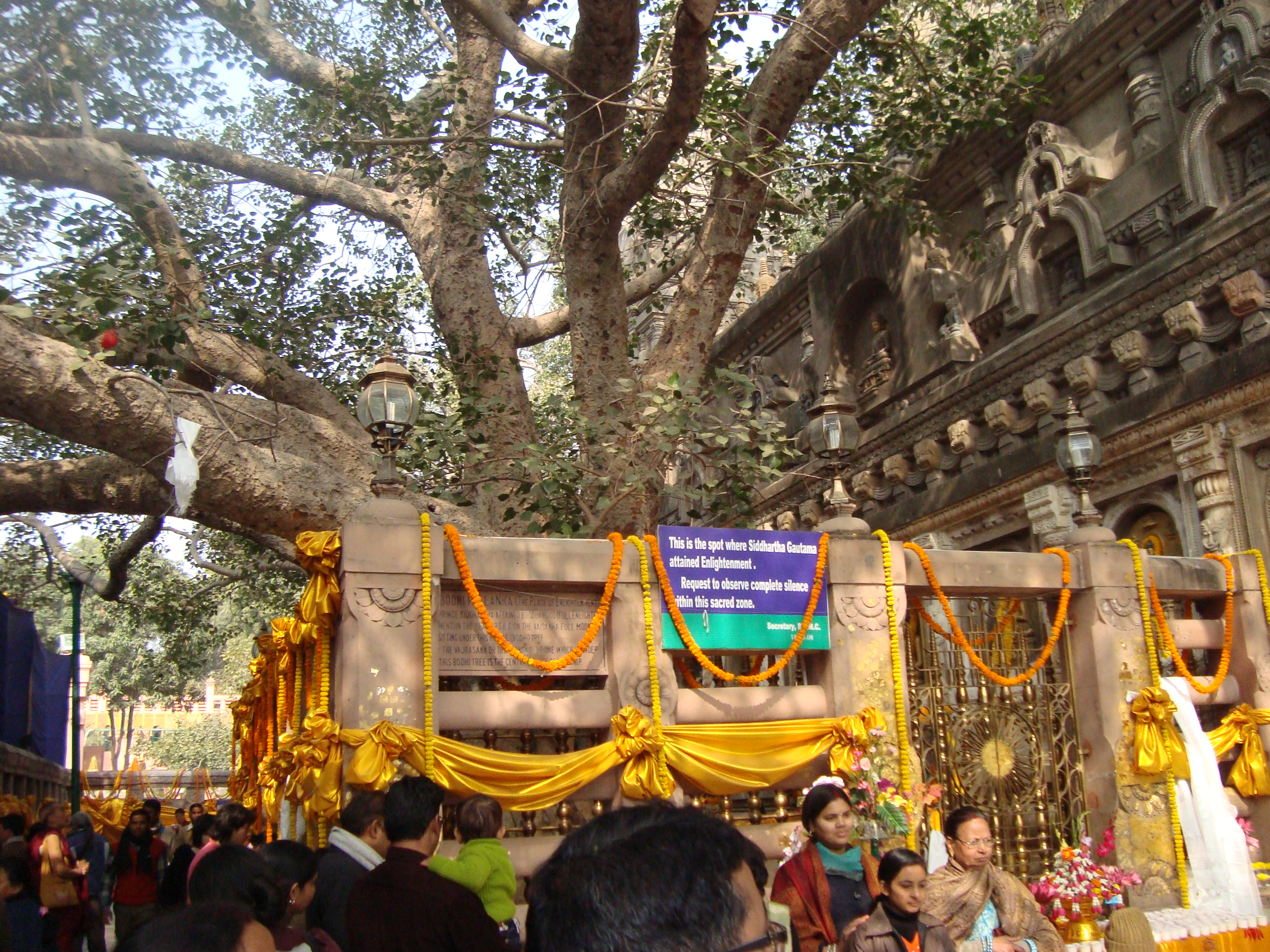
The Bodhi Tree at the Mahabodhi Temple in India. The tree was initially propagated from the Sri Maha Bodhi, which in turn is propagated from the original Bodhi Tree at this location.

Lumbini is a Buddhist pilgrimage site in the Rupandehi District of Nepal. It is the place where, according to Buddhist tradition, Queen Maya gave birth to Siddhartha Gautama in 563 BCE. Lumbini is one of many magnets for pilgrimage that sprang up in places pivotal to the life of the Buddha.

Bodh Gaya, in the state of Bihar in India, is considered by many adherents of Buddhism to be their most holy site. Gautama, who achieved Enlightenment some time around 528 BCE, became the Buddha and founded Buddhism. The Buddha is said to have attained enlightenment while sitting under a peepal tree, called the Bodhi Tree, located in Bodhgaya. At this site of his purported enlightenment the Mahabodhi Temple now stands. Every year, many Buddhists make pilgrimages from all over the world to visit and meditate at the temple.

The Buddha is said to have identified four sites most worthy of pilgrimage for Buddhists, saying that they would produce a feeling of spiritual urgency. These are:

- Lumbini, Nepal, where Queen Maya gave birth to Prince Siddhartha Gautama.
- Bodh Gaya, India, the most important religious site and place of pilgrimage, the Mahabodhi Temple houses what is believed to be the Bodhi Tree where the Buddha realized enlightenment and Buddhahood.
- Sarnath, India, the deer park where the Buddha first taught the Dhamma after realizing enlightenment.
- Kushinagar, India, where the Buddha attained Parinirvana after his death.

In the later commentarial tradition, four more sites were added to make Eight Great Places, places where a miraculous event is reported to have occurred:

- Sravasti: Place of the Twin Miracle, showing his supernatural abilities in performance of miracles. Sravasti is also the place where Buddha spent the largest amount of time, being a major city in ancient India.
- Rajgir: Place of the subduing of Nalagiri, the angry elephant, through friendliness. Rajgir was another major city of ancient India.
- Sankassa: Place of the descending to earth from Tusita heaven (after a stay of three months teaching his mother the Abhidhamma).
- Vaishali: Place of receiving an offering of honey from a monkey. Vaishali was the capital of the Vajjian Republic of ancient India.

There are various other locations in India and Nepal associated with the Buddha, and there are holy sites located throughout Asia for each Buddhist tradition, for instance in Afghanistan, Cambodia, China, India, Indonesia, Japan, Laos, Myanmar, Nepal, Sri Lanka, South Korea and Thailand. Lhasa in Tibet contains many culturally significant Tibetan Buddhist sites such as the Potala Palace, Jokhang temple and Norbulingka palaces.

==== Shugendō ====
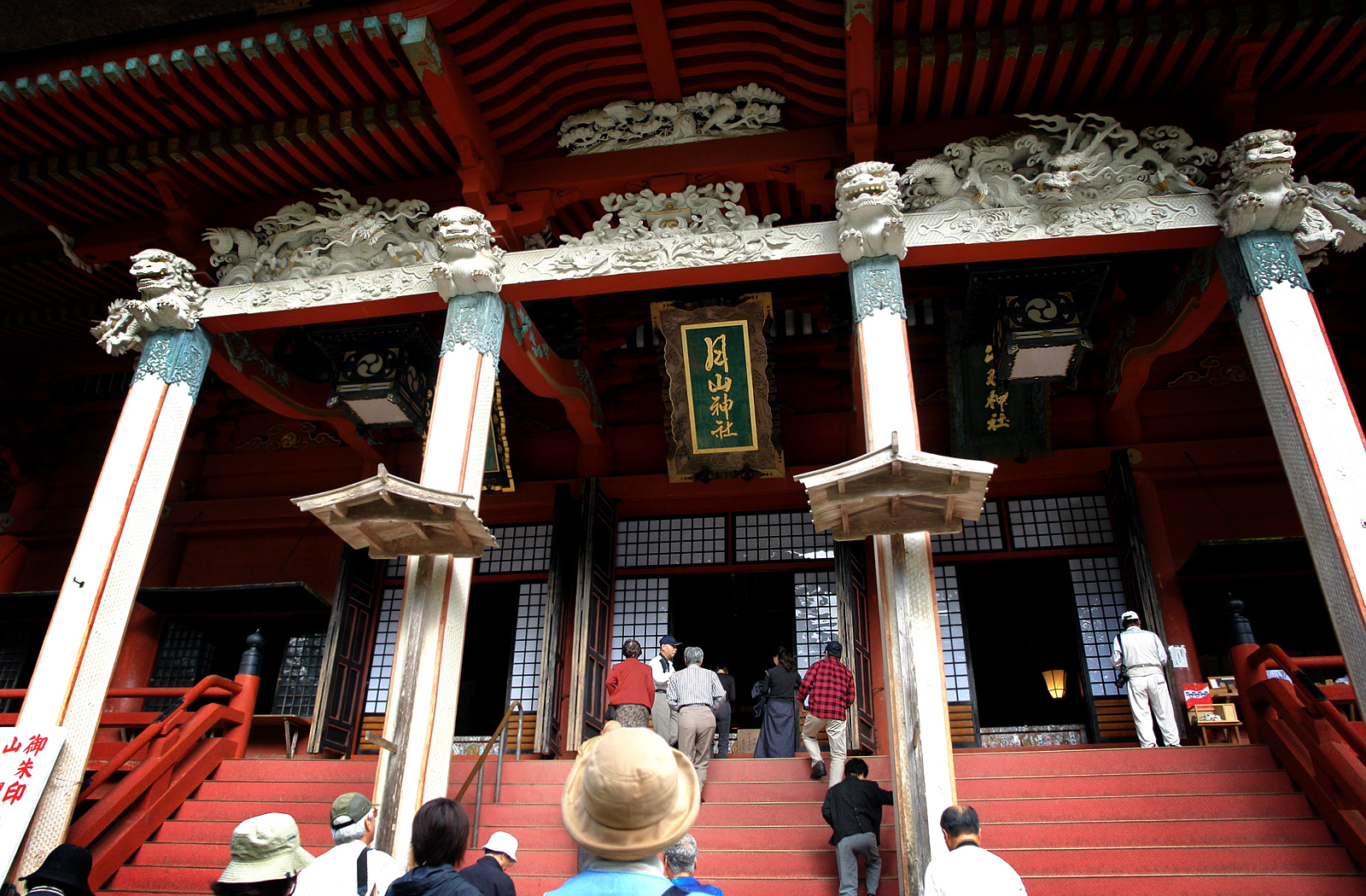
Pilgrims ascend the steps leading to the entrance of Sanzan Gosaiden temple in 2006, at the summit of Mount Haguro.

Shugendō is a small, syncretic, highly esoteric and ascetic sect or sub-sect of Buddhism (mostly related to, and often considered a distinct branch of the Tendai and Shingon schools) combining elements of Zen, Taoism, Koshintō, Japanese folk animism and shamanism. The faith is traditionally believed to have been founded by the śramaṇa and mystic-sorcerer En no Gyōja in the 7th or 8th century. In the same manner as the religion of Shintō, Shugendō is largely relegated to Japan.

The lay practitioners and monks of Shugendō, called Shugenja or yamabushi respectively, venerate mountains as both spiritual areas and, along with nature as a whole, "natural maṇḍalas" .

Adherents of Shugendō consider the collective Three Mountains of Dewa (consisting of Mount Haguro, Mount Gassan, and Mount Yudono), located in the remote Dewa Province of Japan, to be their most sacred of places. The three mountains are also sacred in Shintō.

=== Hinduism ===
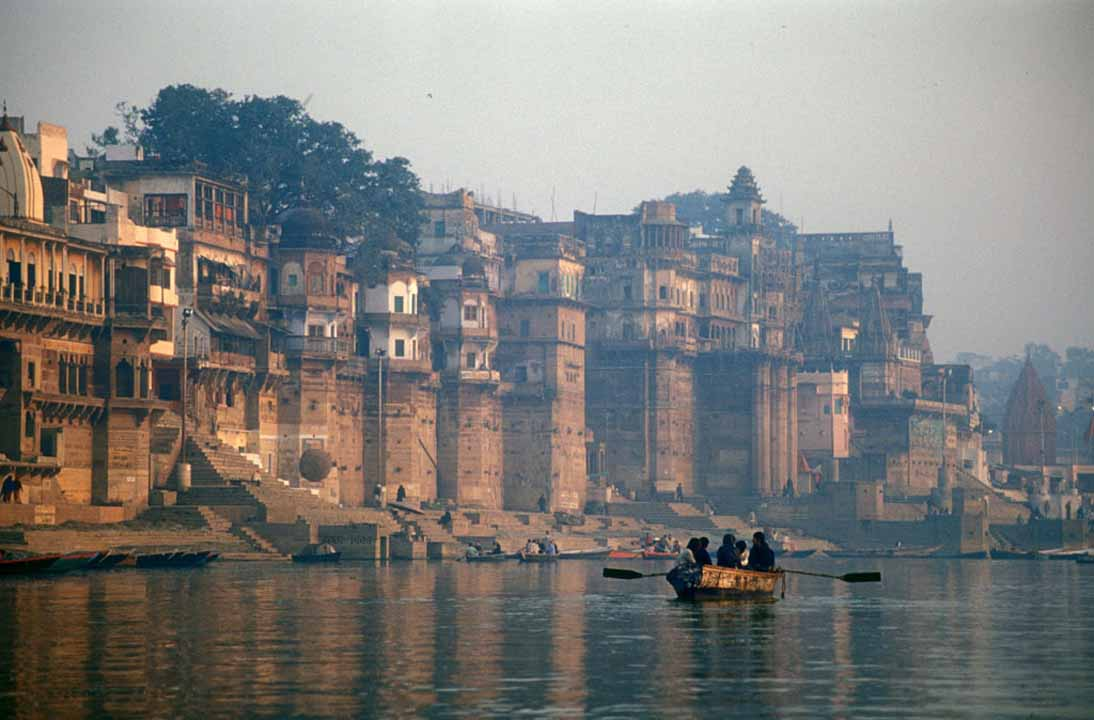
Situated on the banks of river Ganges, Varanasi attracts millions of Hindu pilgrims every year.

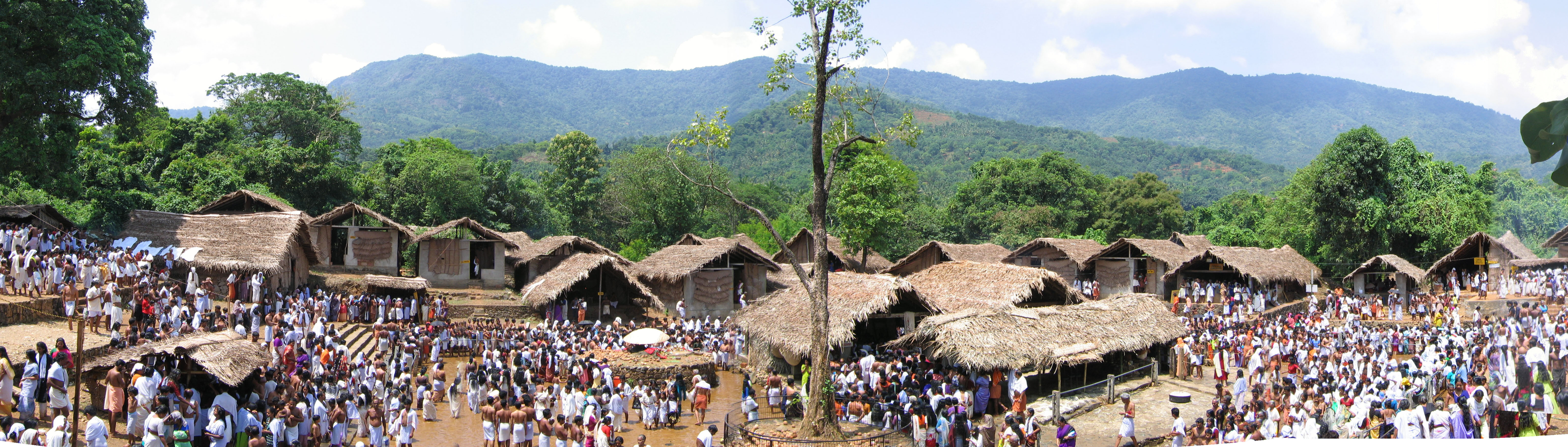
The Vysakha Pilgrimage of Kottiyoor, the pilgrimage in the hills of Western Ghats in Kerala commemorating Daksha yajna

The Indian cities of Varanasi, Ayodhya, Tirumala, Srirangam, Mathura, Haridwar, Kanchipuram, Ujjain, Puri and Dwarka are some of the more famous pilgrim cities in Hinduism. Of these, Varanasi, Uttar Pradesh, is considered the holiest ancient site and it is considered by many to be the most sacred place of pilgrimage for Hindus, irrespective of denomination.

Shaivas in South India, especially Tamil Nadu, consider Chidambaram as their holiest site. Vaishnavas of the region regard Srirangam as their holiest city and refer to it as the earthly abode of Vishnu, Vaikuntha.

The "garbhagriha" (literally womb-house or womb-chamber), the shrine inside a temple complex where the main deity is installed in an area that is in a separate building by itself inside the complex, is the most sacred site within the temple complex.

The garbhagriha usually contains the murti (idol or icon), the primary focus of prayer. In temples with a spire or vimana, this chamber is placed directly underneath it, and the two them form a main vertical axis of the temple. These together may be understood to represent the axis of the world through Mount Meru. The garbhagriha is usually also on the main horizontal axis of the temple which generally is an east–west axis. In those temples where there is also a cross-axis, the garbha griha is generally at their intersection. The Tirumala Venkateswara Temple is a Hindu temple in the hill town of Tirumala, near Tirupati in the Chittoor district of Andhra Pradesh.

The Tirumala Hill is 853 m (2,799 ft) above sea level and is about 10.33 square miles (27 km^{2}) in area. It comprises seven peaks, representing the seven heads of Shesha, thus earning the name Seshachalam. The seven peaks are called Seshadri, Neeladri, Garudadri, Anjanadri, Vrushabhadri, Narayanadri, and Venkatadri. The temple is on Venkatadri (also known as Venkatachala or Venkata Hill), the seventh peak, and is also known as the "Temple of Seven Hills". The presiding deity of the temple is Venkateswara, a form of the Hindu god Vishnu. Venkateswara is known by other names: Balaji, Govinda, and Srinivasa. The temple lies on the southern banks of Sri Swami Pushkarini, a holy water tank. The temple complex comprises a traditional temple building, with a number of modern queue and pilgrim lodging sites.

It is most-visited place of worship in the world. The temple is visited by about 50,000 to 100,000 pilgrims daily (30 to 40 million people annually on average), while on special occasions and festivals, like the annual brahmotsavam, the number of pilgrims shoots up to 500,000.

There are yearly pilgrimage gatherings such as Kumbh Mela Pilgrimage (3-year or 12), Shabarimala Pilgrimage, Kottiyoor Vysakha Pilgrimage where in thousands of people gather in a certain period of a year for pilgrimage.

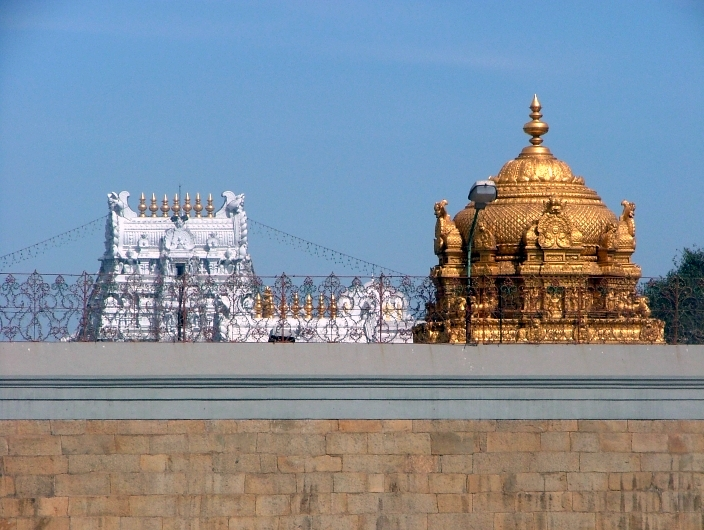
The Golden gopuram: Ananda Nilayam above the garbhagriha of Venkateshwara Temple, Tirumala

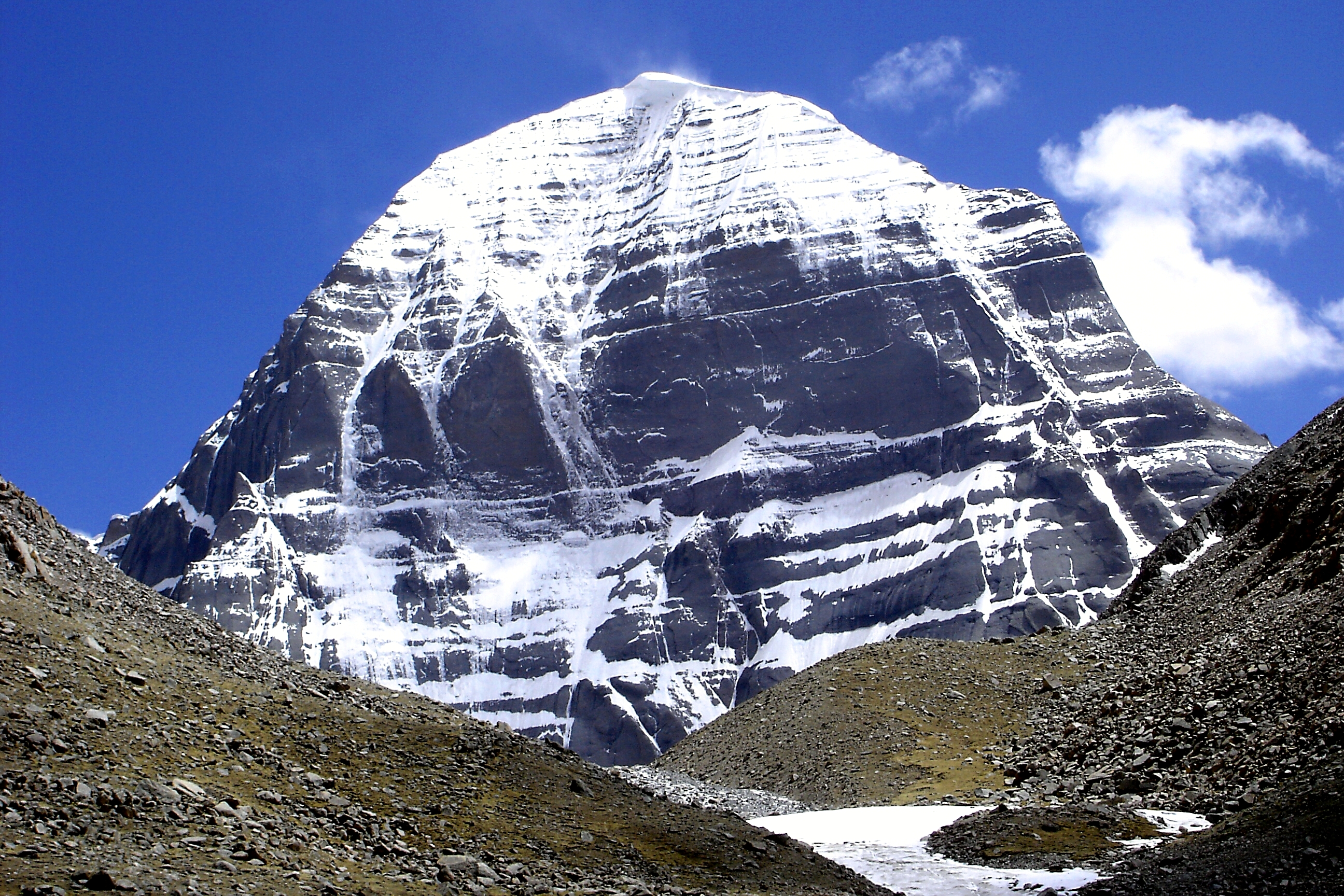
Mount Kailash in Tibet is revered as the holy abode of Shiva.

=== Jainism ===
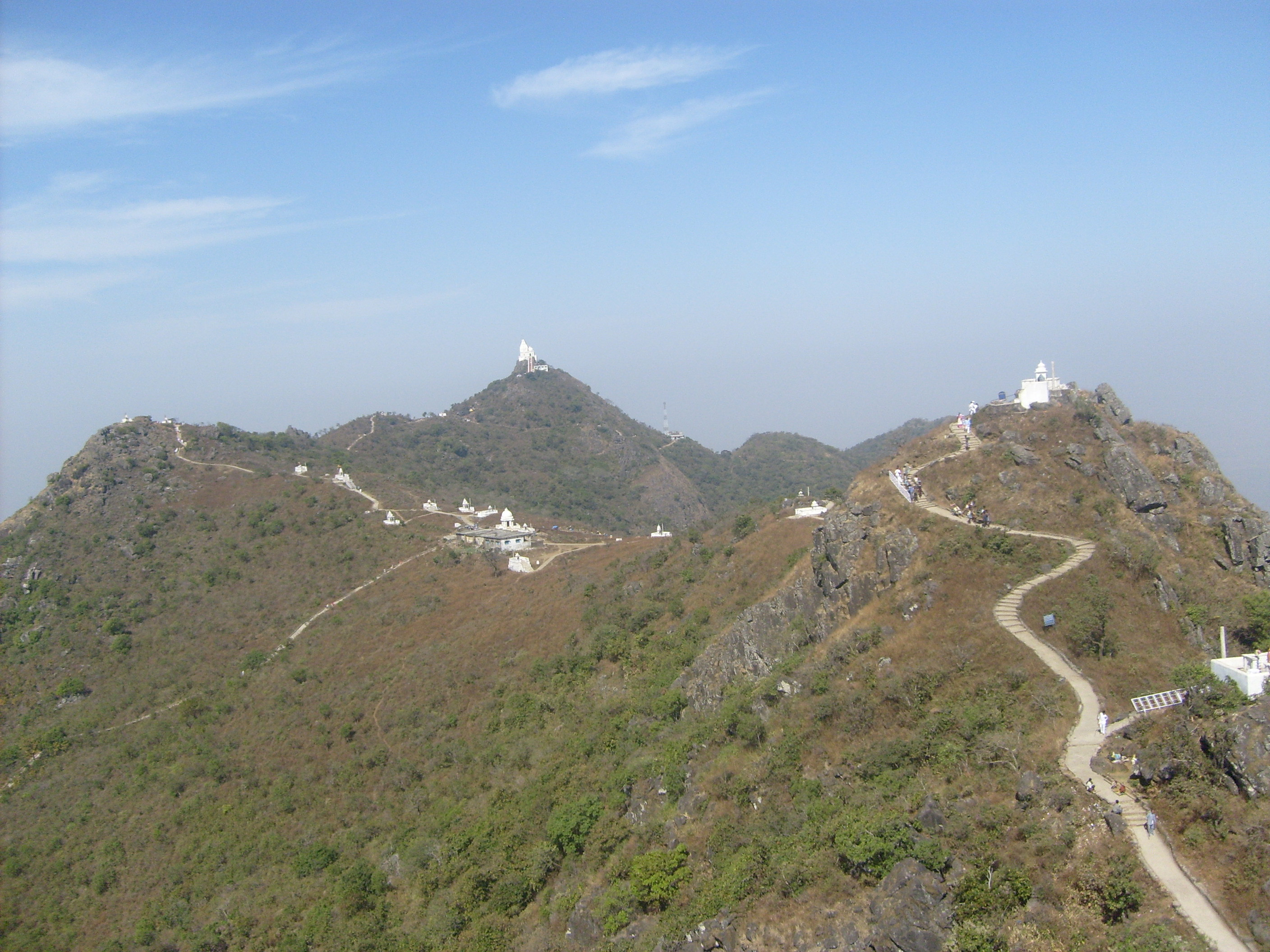
Jain Temples at Parasnath Shikharji Hills – a view

The Palitana temples on Mount Shatrunjaya, located by the city of Palitana, in Bhavnagar district, Gujarat, India, are considered one of the holiest places for Jains. Jains believes that a visit to this group of temples is essential once in a lifetime to achieve nirvana or salvation, although many Jains frequent it many times in their lifestyle.

Shikharji or Śrī Sammed Śikharjī (श्री सम्मेद शिखरजी), also known as the Parasnath Hill, located in Giridih district in Jharkhand, India, is a major Jain pilgrimage destination and is one of the most sacred place for Jains in the world. According to Jain belief, twenty of the twenty-four Tirthankaras (teachers of the Jains) attained Moksha (Nirvana) from this place. Parasnath Hill, with a height of 1,350 metres (4,430 ft), is the highest mountain in the state of Jharkhand. The number of Tirthankars who attained nirvana at Shri Sammet Shikharji is 20. For each of them there is a shrine on the hill.

The hill is also known as Parasnath, a name derived from Parshva, the 23rd Tirthankara who attained Nirvana there. The present temple is not very old, although the idol in the main temple is ancient. The Sanskrit inscriptions at the foot of the images indicate that they were installed in the temple in 1678 CE.

Archaeologists believe some of the existing temple edifices on Parasnath Hill date from 1765 CE although the place is of greater antiquity. It is certain that the present edifices replace older edifices, which were demolished. Jain temples are often pulled down and re-built.

=== Sikhism ===
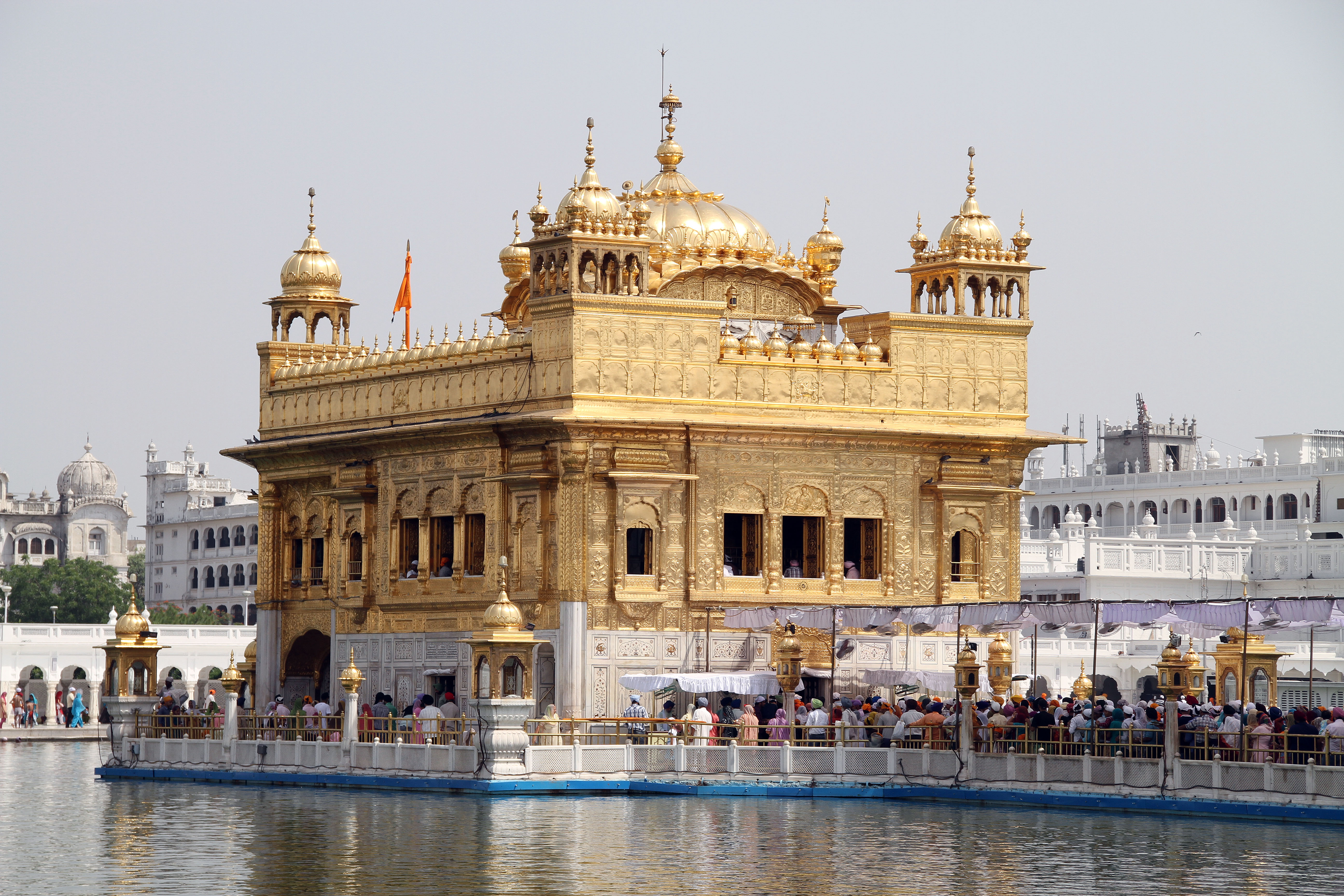
Harmandir Sahib

Harmandir Sahib, or Darbar Sahib (also known as the Golden Temple), is culturally the most important shrine in Sikhism, considered the spiritual and cultural centre of Sikhs. Located in Amritsar, Punjab, India. It is one of the oldest Sikh gurdwaras. It is located in the city of Amritsar, India, which was established by Guru Ram Das, the fourth guru of the Sikhs and the city was also built around the shrine, known as "Guru Di Nagri" meaning city of the Sikh Guru. It is made from white marble to keep the ground cool and pleasant. It was later laid with real gold which was provided by the emperor of Sikh Empire, Maharaja Ranjit Singh.

Another significant place is the village of Nankana Sahib in Pakistan, the birthplace of Guru Nanak, founder of Sikhism. Each of Nankana Sahib's gurdwaras are associated with different events in Guru Nanak Dev's life. The town remains an important site of pilgrimage for Sikhs worldwide. Punjab province of Pakistan is also the location of many important religious and historical sites for Sikhs, including the place of martyrdom of fifth Sikh Guru, Guru Arjan Dev. Many other important Sikh Shrines are located in the Punjab state of India as well as other parts in India.

The Panj Takht are the five gurudwaras which are revered as the seats of power in Sikhism. They are all located in India – the Akal Takht Sahib in Amritsar, Punjab; the Keshgarh Sahib in Anandpur Sahib, Punjab; the Damdama Sahib in Bathinda, Punjab; the Takht Sri Patna Sahib in Patna, Bihar and the Hazur Sahib Nanded in Nanded, Maharashtra.

== East Asian religions ==
=== Confucianism ===
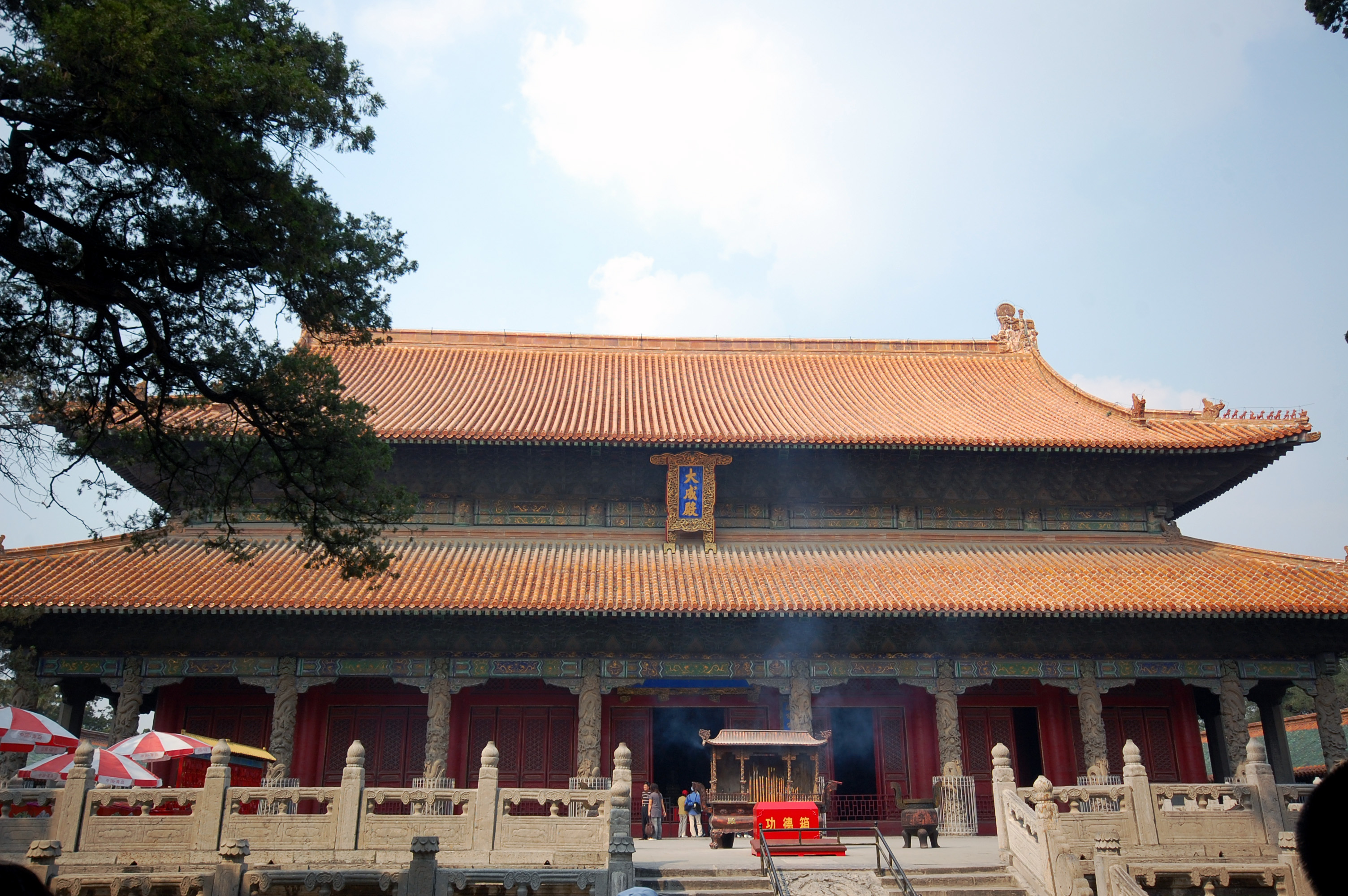
The main sanctuary of the Temple of Confucius in Qufu

Confucianism is often regarded as either a religion, philosophy or quasi-religious system of beliefs based upon the teachings of the ancient Chinese sage Confucius. Confucius's philosophy stresses a firm sense of ethical and political order and how to achieve these ends in order to benefit society.

While Confucianism is no longer as organized of an ideology as it once was, it still continues as a quasi-religious tradition and temples of Confucius exist throughout China. The most important is the Temple of Confucius in Confucius's hometown of Qufu. Other sites include the Cemetery of Confucius and the Kong Family Mansion in Qufu, Shandong Province of China.

=== Shinto ===
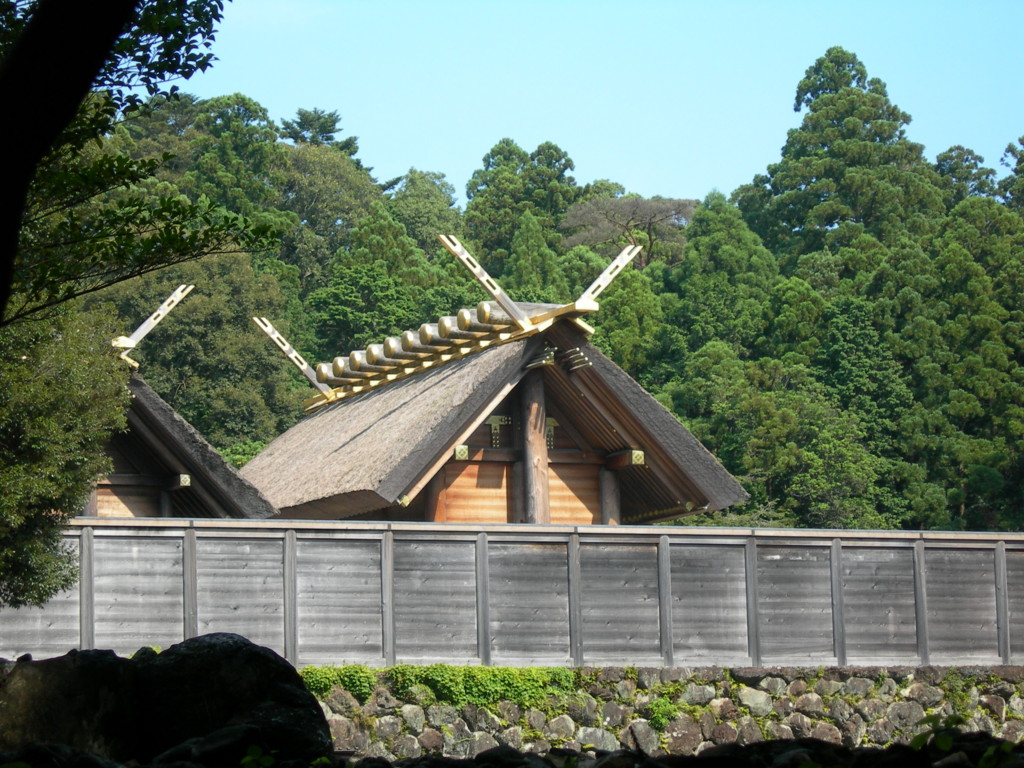
"Naikū, Ise Shrine"

Ise Shrine is the formal home of Amaterasu ōmikami, the primary deity of Shinto and traditionally believed to be a direct ancestor of the Japanese Imperial Family. It is located in the city of Ise in Mie prefecture, Japan. Access is strictly limited, with the public allowed to see merely the thatched roofs of the central structures, hidden behind three tall wooden fences. The Ise Shrine is purportedly the home of the Sacred Mirror.

=== Taoism ===
Four sacred mountains of Taoism:

- Wudang Mountains, in Shiyan, Hubei Province of China;
- Mount Qingcheng, in Dujiangyan, Sichuan Province;
- Mount Longhu, in Yingtan, Jiangxi Province;
- Mount Qiyun, in Huangshan, Anhui Province.

=== Tenrikyo ===
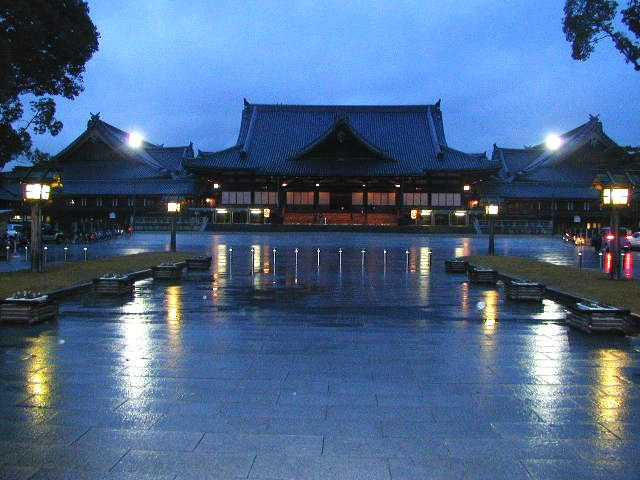
The Tenrikyo worship hall complex surrounding the Jiba

Followers of Tenrikyo believe that creation of the world occurred at a point called the Jiba, in Tenri City, Nara Prefecture, Japan. A pillar called the Kanrodai is erected on the exact point of the Jiba, and a set of worship halls have been constructed around it. A sacred dance is performed around the Kanrodai during the monthly worship services, and the daily prayers of Tenrikyo practitioners are performed while facing the direction of the Jiba. As it is considered that humans were originally created at the Jiba, the greeting "welcome home" (okaeri nasai in Japanese) is commonly used by believers to greet visitors.

=== Church Of World Messianity ===
Followers of the Church of World Messianity believe that the physical world transformation in a paradise in Earth will began in the "sacred ground" places that the church built in order to be the prototype of Heaven in Earth. There are actually five of these sacred grounds in the world: three in Japan, in the cities of Atami, Hakone, and Kyoto; one in Saraburi, Thailand; and one in São Paulo, Brazil.

== New religious movements ==
This section of the article contains a list of religious sites significant to new religious movements besides Rastafari and Tenrikyo, which are listed above in their relevant sections.

=== Modern paganism ===
==== Modern Druidry ====
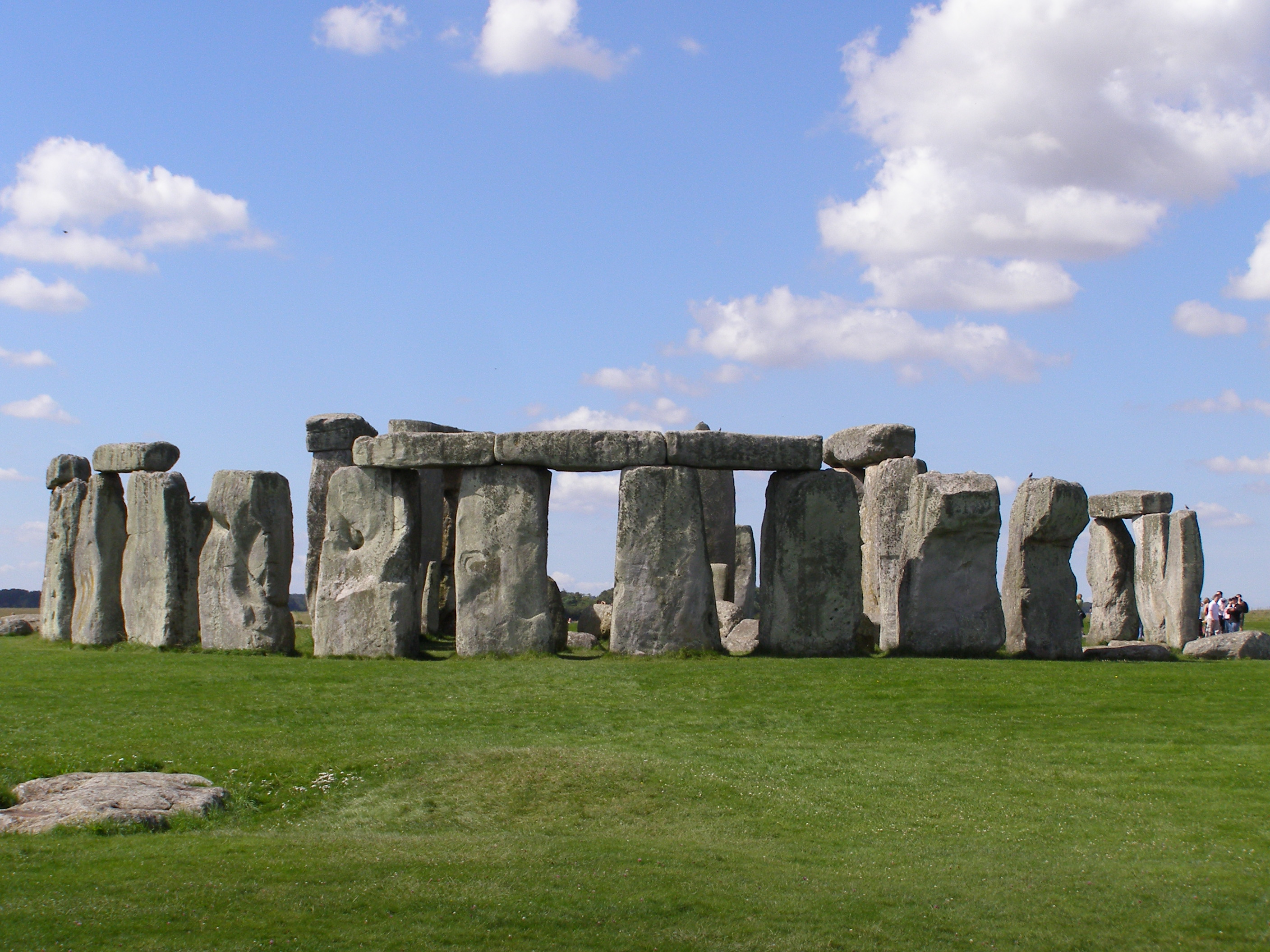
Stonehenge, a site of pilgrimage for Druids

Stonehenge is a site of religious significance in Neo-Druidism as Druids perform pilgrimage there. The first modern Druids to perform ceremonies at this site were the Ancient Order of Druids.

==== Roman Traditionalism ====
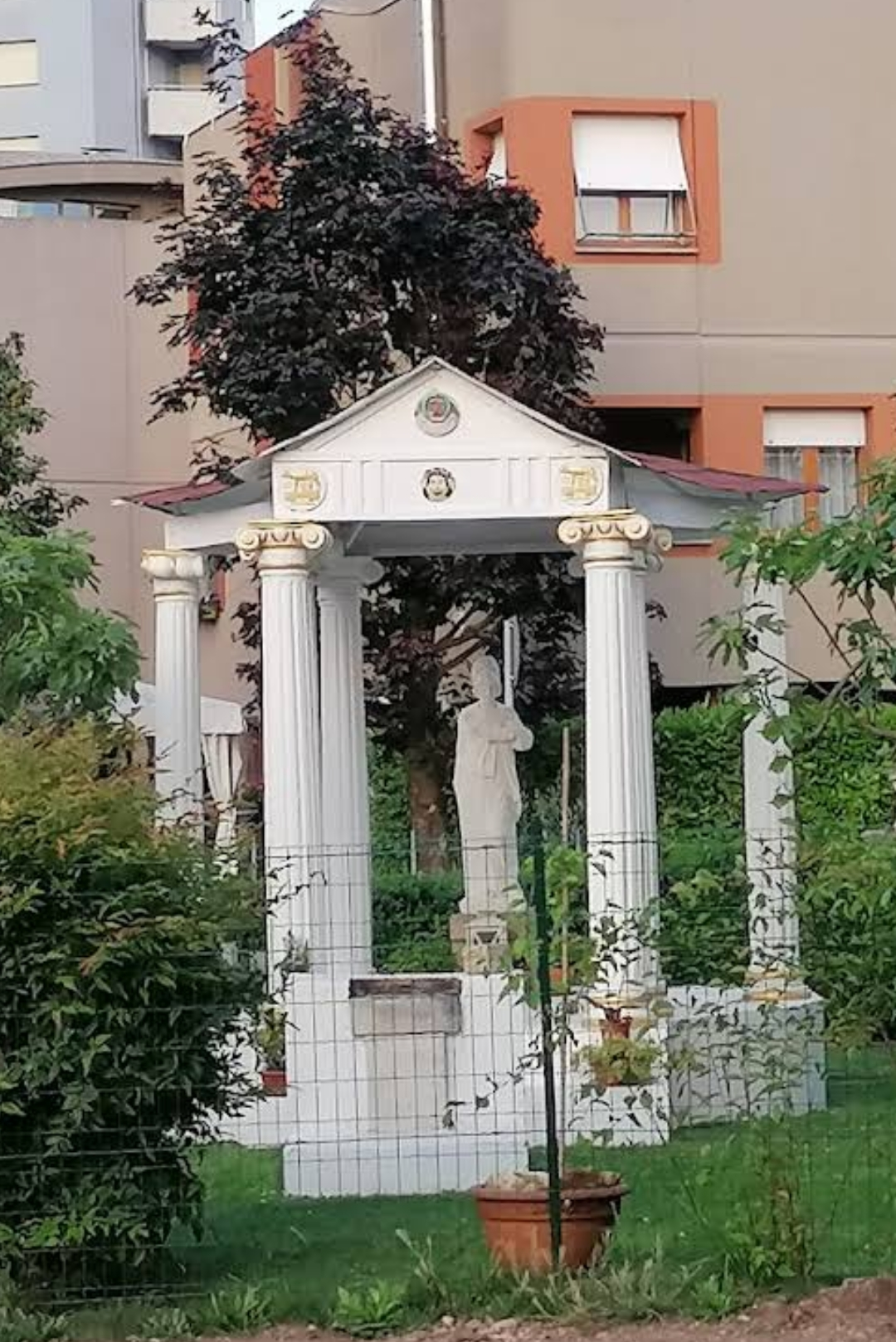
Tempio di Minerva Medica a Pordenone

- Temple of Jupiter (Templum Iovis), Torre Gaia, Rome
- Aedes of Apollo Pithian Hyperborean (Templum Apollinis Pithi Hyperborei), Rome
- Aedes Roma Pietatis, Torre Gaia, Rome
- Aedes Minerva, Torre Gaia, Rome
- Aedes Martis, Torre Gaia, Rome
- Temple of Aegeria (Templum Aegeria), Torre Gaia, Rome
- Temple of Venus Verticordia (Templum Veneris Verticordiae), Torre Gaia, Rome
- Temple of Neptune (Templum Neptuni), Torre Gaia, Rome
- Temple of Mercury (Templum Mercurii), Torre Gaia, Rome
- Aedes Martis, Appia Antica, Rome
- Temple of Apollo (Templum Apollinis), Ardea

Sicily

- Temple of Apollo (Templum Apollinis), Palermo
- Temple of Neptune (Temple Neptuni), Palermo
- Temple of Ceres (Templum Cereris), Enna, Leonforte
- Temple of Herakles (Templum Herculis), Enna, Leonforte

Apulia

- Temple of Apollo (Templum Apollinis), Taranto

Veneto

- Temple of Minerva Medica (Templum Minervae Medicae), Pordenone

=== Thelema ===
Thelemites do not normally carry out pilgrimages, but a certain number of adherents of Thelema regard Egypt, and Cairo and Giza in particular, to be important. Notable destinations for Thelemites traveling to or in Egypt include the King's Chamber in the Pyramid of Khufu, which is part of the Giza Necropolis in Giza, the Egyptian Museum in the Cairo district of Boulaq, and Downtown Cairo.

Other notable sites of historical or spiritual significance to many Thelemites are the now derelict Abbey of Thelema in the Sicilian city of Cefalu, Italy, and Boleskine House near Loch Ness in Scotland.

=== Revivalism ===
Watt Town is the principal sacred and pilgrimage site in Revivalism, an Afro-American religion in Jamaica.

== Iranian religions ==
=== Yazidism ===
Lalish, located in northern Iraq, is the most sacred site in the Yazidi religion. The tomb of Sheikh Adi ibn Musafir is located in Lalish.

=== Zoroastrianism ===
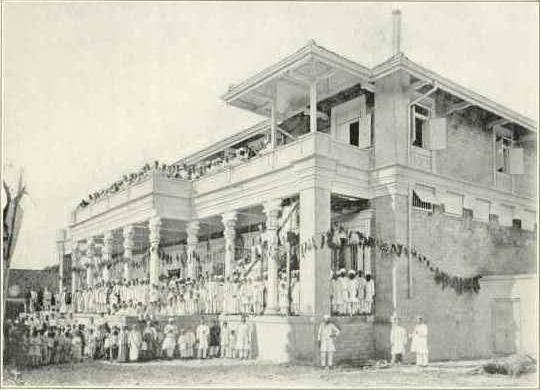
Fire temple of Udvada

Udvada is a town in Gujarat, India renowned for its Zoroastrian Atash Behram. This place of worship is the oldest still-functioning example of its kind, and has established Udvada as a pilgrimage center for Zoroastrians the world over.

== See also ==
- List of burial places of founders of religious traditions
- Holy places
- Honden
- List of founders of religious traditions
- List of religions
- List of religious texts
- List of sacred languages
- List of shrines
- Pilgrimage
- Place of worship
- Religious symbolism
- Sacred architecture
- Sacred travel
- Sacred sites in Mecca
