= Wilson's Arch (Jerusalem) =

Ancient stone arch in Jerusalem

- קשת וילסון (Hebrew)
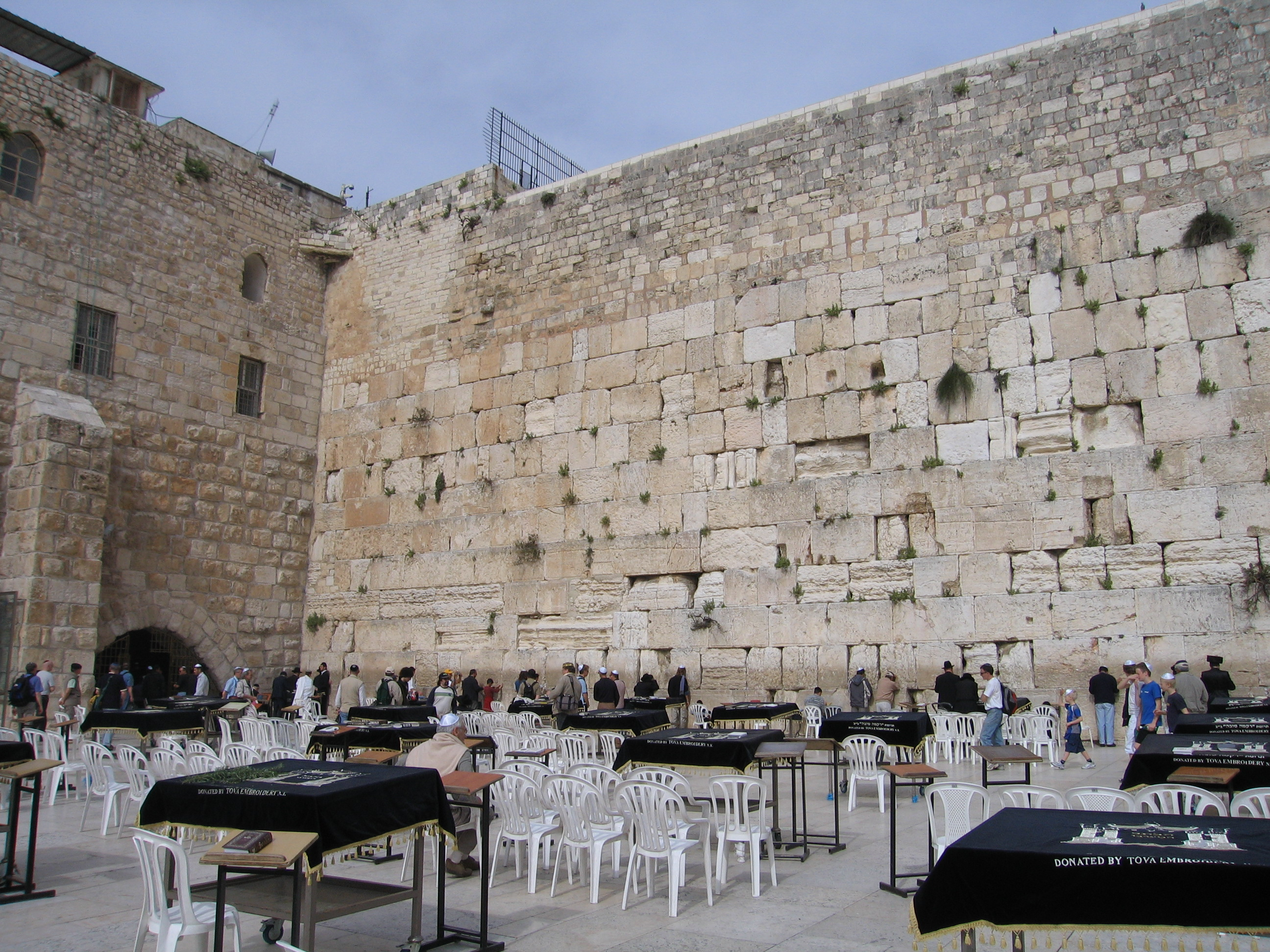
- Western Wall, with the passage leading to Wilson's Arch on the left, in 2006

- Location within Old City of Jerusalem
- 31°46′36″N 35°14′03″E
- Location: Western Wall, Old City of Jerusalem

History
- Built: 20 BCE – 20 CE; enlarged 30–60 CE
- Built by: Herod the Great; Roman Procurators (Pontius Pilate?) (enlarged)

Site notes
- Material: Limestone
- Height: exposed: 6 metres (20 ft)
- Condition: Preserved

Wilson's Arch (Hebrew: קשת וילסון, romanized: Keshet Vilson) is the modern name for an ancient stone arch in Jerusalem, the first in a row of arches that supported a large bridge connecting the Herodian Temple Mount with the Upper City on the opposite Western Hill. The Arch springs from the Western Wall and is still visible underneath later buildings set against the Wall. The name Wilson's Arch is also used to denote the interior hall currently used as a synagogue, which the arch partially covers. This hall opens towards the Western Wall Plaza at the Plaza's northeast corner, so that it appears on the left side of the Kotel’s prayer section along the Western Wall, to visitors facing the Wall.

The Arch once spanned 13 metres (42 ft), supporting a bridge that carried both a street and an aqueduct. The late-Second Temple period bridge stood over a stone-paved street, similar to Robinson's Arch and allowed people to access a gate that was level with the surface of the Temple Mount. Excavations between 2015 and 2019 collected organic material in the mortar used during various stages of construction. Radiocarbon dating indicated that the initial bridge to the Temple Mount was completed between 20 BCE and 20 CE, and a doubling in width occurred between 30 CE and 60 CE. The ground level during the Second Temple period was lower by some 3 m (9.8 ft) than its height during the period of the Early Arab conquest. In the 1980s it was thought that the original stones of the arch lie within the fillings at a depth of about 8 meters below the contemporary paved level, but this was proven to be wrong.

== Name ==
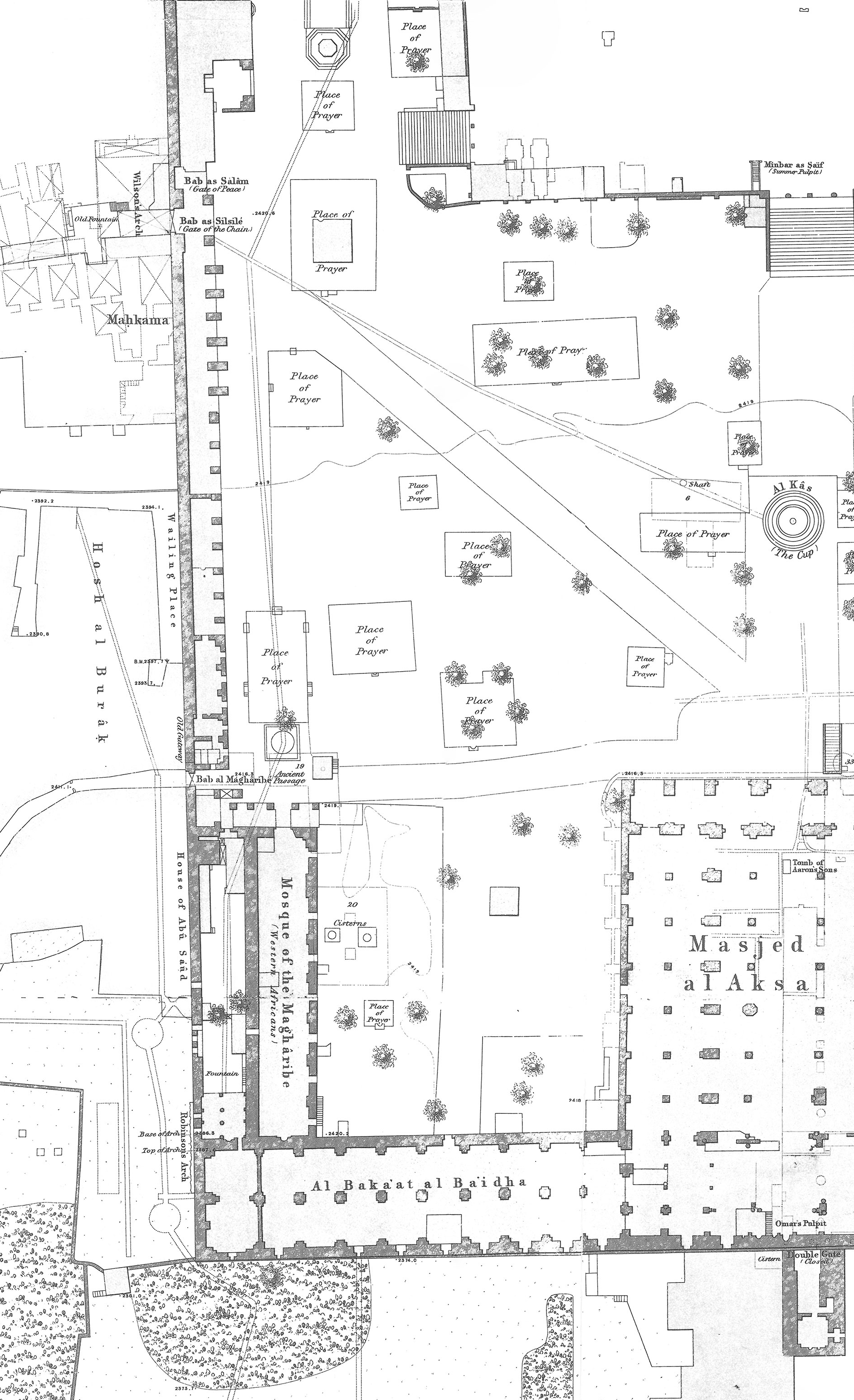
Wilson's 1865 Ordnance Survey of Jerusalem marks "Wilson's Arch" at the top of this site plan

In the description of the survey he made at the site, Charles Wilson wrote about "[t]he arch, which Sir Henry James has called after my name".

The bridge was part of what is sometimes called the "royal bridge", sometimes capitalised, based on Josephus' description of the Herodian Temple. Charles Warren, Wilson's contemporary and fellow archaeologist, called the remains of the bridge the "Great Causeway", and the underground corridor along its southern side the "Secret Passage".

== Location ==
The Arch is located below the Street of the Chain leading to the Chain Gate of the Temple Mount. It connects to the Western Wall to the east and can be accessed by men from the Western Wall Plaza and by women from inside adjacent buildings.

== Purpose ==
Wilson's Arch was built as part of a bridge described by Josephus that connected the Temple Mount to the Upper City on the Western Hill; it carried a road as well as the last section of an aqueduct bringing water from Solomon's Pools near Bethlehem to the Temple Mount.

== Date ==
The remains of the first arch of the bridge, known as Wilson's Arch, are distinct from those of the rest of the bridge and other possible later additions to it.

=== Absolute date ===
Excavations between 2015 and 2019 collected organic material in the mortar used during various stages of construction. Radiocarbon dating published in 2020 indicated that the initial bridge to the Temple Mount was completed between 20 BCE and 20 CE, and a doubling in width occurred between 30 CE and 60 CE. The 2020 study concluded that Wilson's Arch was initiated by Herod the Great, and enlarged during the Roman Procurators, such as Pontius Pilate, in a range of 70 years.

Not directly relevant to the dating process of the Arch are the pools built beneath it, the oldest of which was carbon-dated to 1305–1340 CE during the Mamluk period.

=== Structural correlations and relative date ===
Before the radiocarbon study published in 2020, which offered accurate absolute dates for the two construction phases of the Arch, the main method applied for obtaining a relative date was the interpretation of the correlation between the various successive structures at the site, most of which proved in the end to be inaccurate.

==== Herodian and/or Late Roman ====
Stinespring argued already in the 1960s that the Arch is still preserved in its original Herodian form, based on the way it is bonded to the retaining wall of the Temple Mount, which indicates that it is "a definitive part of the ancient Temple structure."

The fact that a Roman theater-like structure, which was discovered right underneath the Arch, was never finished due to the outbreak of the Bar Kokhba Revolt (132–135 CE) or the death of the Emperor Hadrian in 138 CE, gives the terminus ante quem the Arch was built.

==== Discarded theory: Umayyad reconstruction ====
Before 2020, there were scholars who favored dating the Arch's construction to the Umayyad period (661–750), basing their conclusions on what they saw as evidence from the period of excavation after the Six-Day War, when Israel's Ministry of Religious Affairs began to excavate the still unexposed areas of the Western Wall, and dug a tunnel beneath the existing structures above. During much of the time of these excavations, which went on between 1968–82 and were restarted in 1985, the Israel Antiquities Authority's (IAA) District Archeologist for Jerusalem was Dan Bahat, who became the archaeologist of the site after resigning from the IAA. In his 1995 article Jerusalem Down Under: Tunneling Along Herod's Temple Mount Wall, he wrote that the evidence found was enough to convince him that despite earlier beliefs that the Arch was built during Herod's time, the later dating is correct.

It was believed by those who dated the current Arch to the later period, that it was a replacement for an earlier arch erected during the Second Temple period, and that the Umayyads didn't just restore the retaining walls surrounding the Mount, but also rebuilt the arches of the "Great Bridge" between Western Hill and Temple Mount.

== Dimensions ==
The Arch was measured by Wilson, who noted that its crown reaches a height of 22.17 metres (72 ft 9 in) above bedrock, and Bahat writes that the Herodian street which ran along the western wall is about 6.1 metres (20 ft) above bedrock at the site. Wilson also noted the Arch's span being of 13 metres (42 ft). Only a 6.1-metre (20 ft) portion of the Arch is visible today.

A square shaft cut down under the arch allows sighting of the wall's courses of dressed stone hidden below the present ground level, fourteen in total, one being cut into the bedrock, reaching a depth of 16-metre (52 ft).

== Discovery and excavation ==
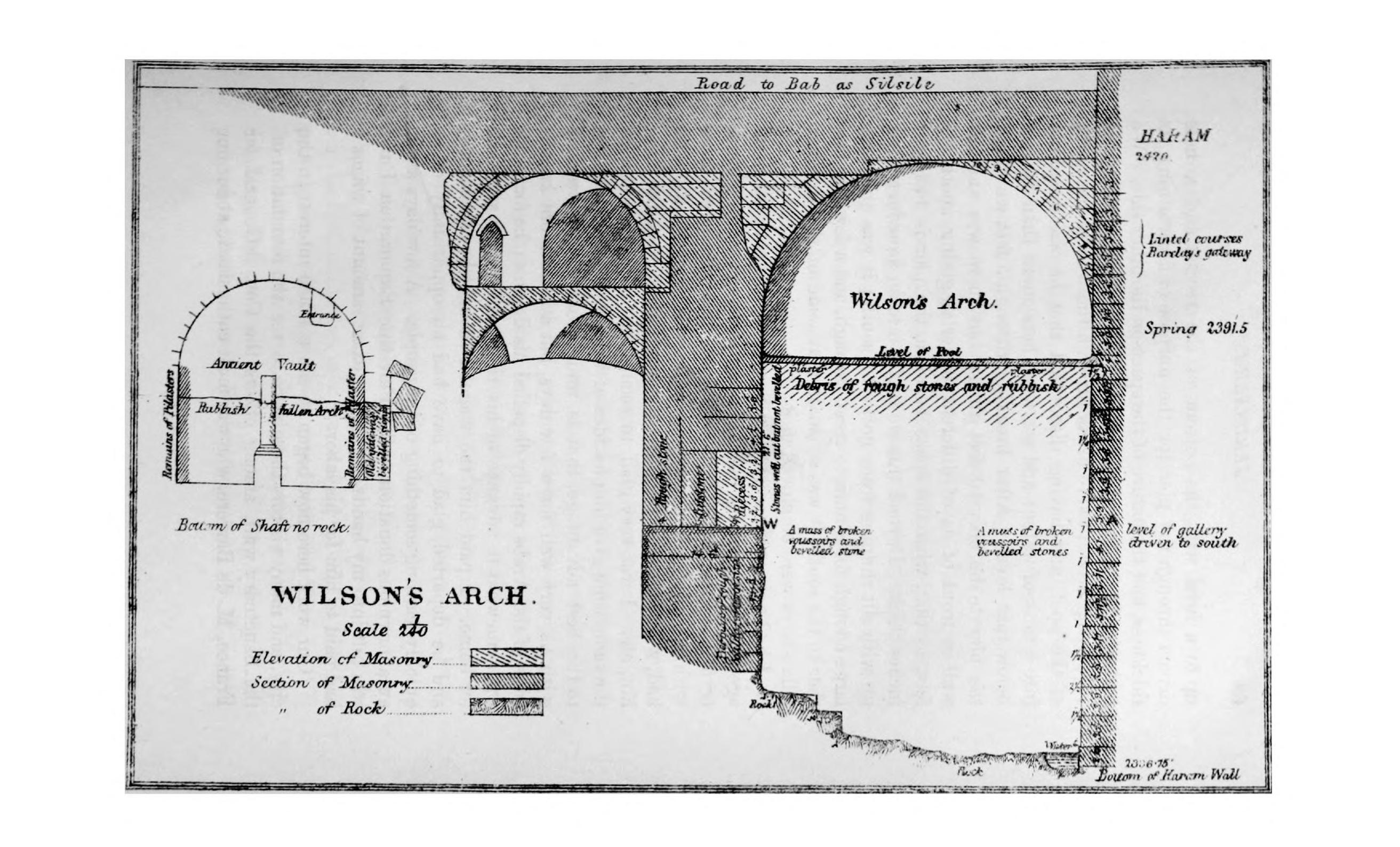
Wilson's 1871 diagram

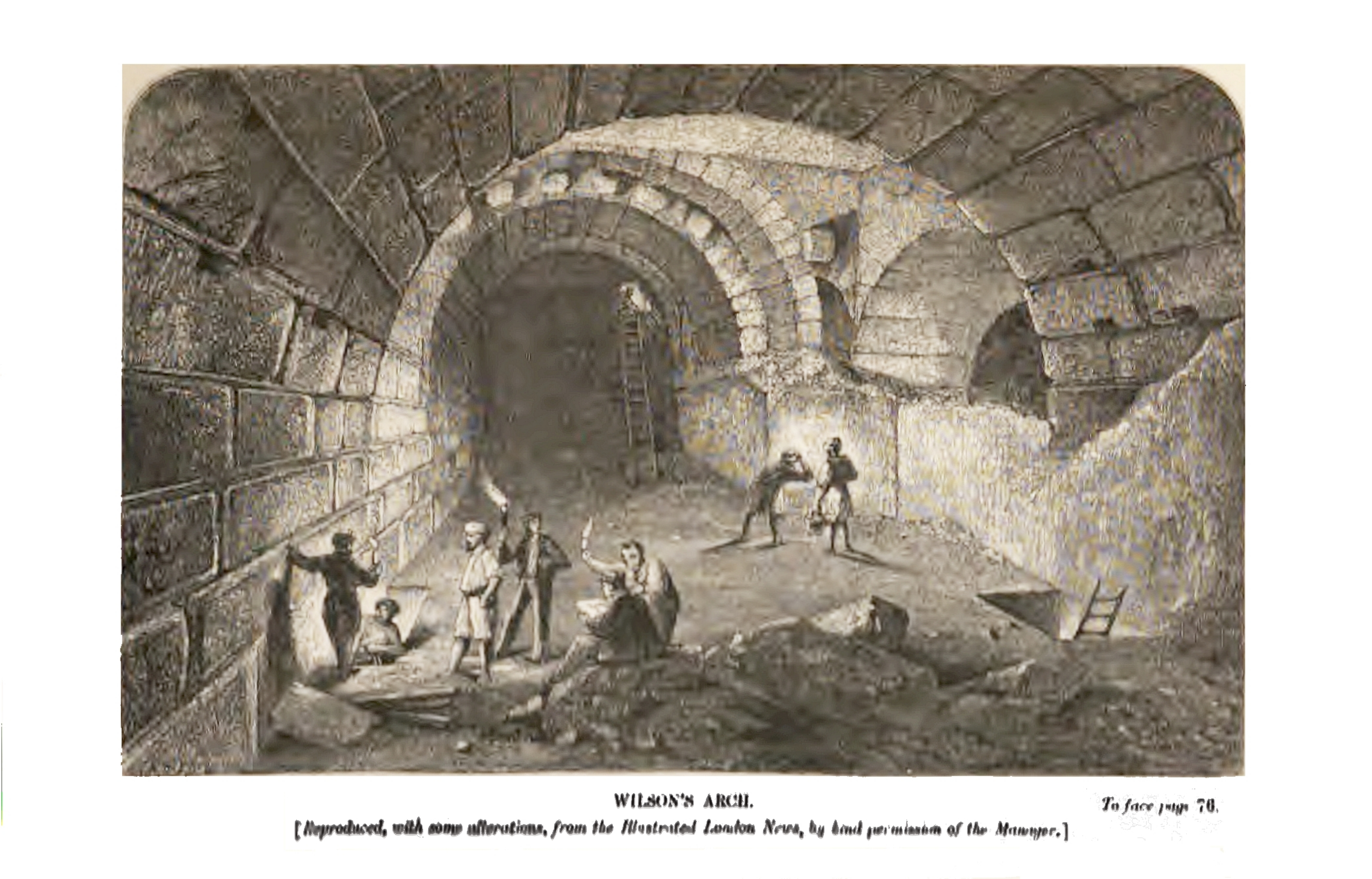
Sketch of Wilson's discovery

Titus Tobler noted the structure and wrote in 1853 that "I regard the vaults as supporting arches for the path or bridge that leads from Suk Bab es-Sinsleh to Bab es-Sinsleh" (sic, es-Silsileh). The arch was scientifically documented for the first time in 1865 by explorer and surveyor Charles Wilson, for whom it was named. Wilson had joined the Ordnance Survey of Jerusalem in 1864, continuing to participate in the city surveying project that was established to improve the city's water system. Not long after Wilson, Charles Warren excavated under the arch by digging two trial shafts, one along the western pier all the way down to bedrock. He published his discoveries in 1876.

In 1968, only a few months after the Six-Day War, Israel began excavations to uncover the portion of the Western Wall that was not exposed. As the excavations continued, the opening to the arch was uncovered, and rubble began to be removed. The entire length of the Western Wall was only cleared in 1985, 17 years later.

The space under the arch was fitted out after 1967 as a synagogue, with a new floor built over the floor of a large Mamluk-Ottoman water reservoir, called by Warren 'Pool Al Burak'. The presence of the synagogue restricted further excavation under Wilson's Arch to a large degree, with limited digs being carried out in 2006 and 2011, followed by a substantial dig between 2015 and 2018, which explored the space under Wilson's Arch in its entirety, i.e. 13 m × 15 m (43 ft × 49 ft), so 195 m^{2} (2,100 sq ft). This large project focused on dating the arch and, after exposing a theatre-like structure directly beneath it, the date and function of this unexpected finding.

== Associated structures ==
=== Herodian "Western Stone" ===
The Western Stone, located in the north section of the Arch, is a monolithic stone block forming part of the lower level of the Western Wall. Weighing 570 t (630 short tons), it is one of the largest building blocks in the world. The stone is 13.6 meters (45 feet) long, 4.5 meters (15 feet) wide and has an estimated height of 3.5 meters (11 feet). It is considered to be one of the heaviest objects ever lifted by human beings without powered machines. It is the largest building stone found in Israel and second in the world. It is only partially intact, the rest was destroyed in 70 CE during the Roman siege of Jerusalem.

=== Roman theater-like structure ===
A small Roman theater-like structure was discovered directly below the Arch. The theater was never finished, this being possibly the result of the Bar Kokhba Revolt (132–135) or the death of Emperor Hadrian (r. 117–138).

=== Mamluk-Ottoman "Al-Buraq" Pool ===
The modern synagogue under the arch covers the Mamluk-Ottoman cistern known in the time of Wilson and Warren as the 'Pool Al Burak'.

=== Makhkama building ===
Over the prayer hall area partially covered by the Arch is the large building known as the Makhkama or Tankiziyya, that includes a porch looking over the Temple Mount. Former Chief Rabbi Shlomo Goren used to use that porch to recite special "Kinot" prayers on the night of Tisha B'Av.

== Modern synagogue ==
Wilson's Arch
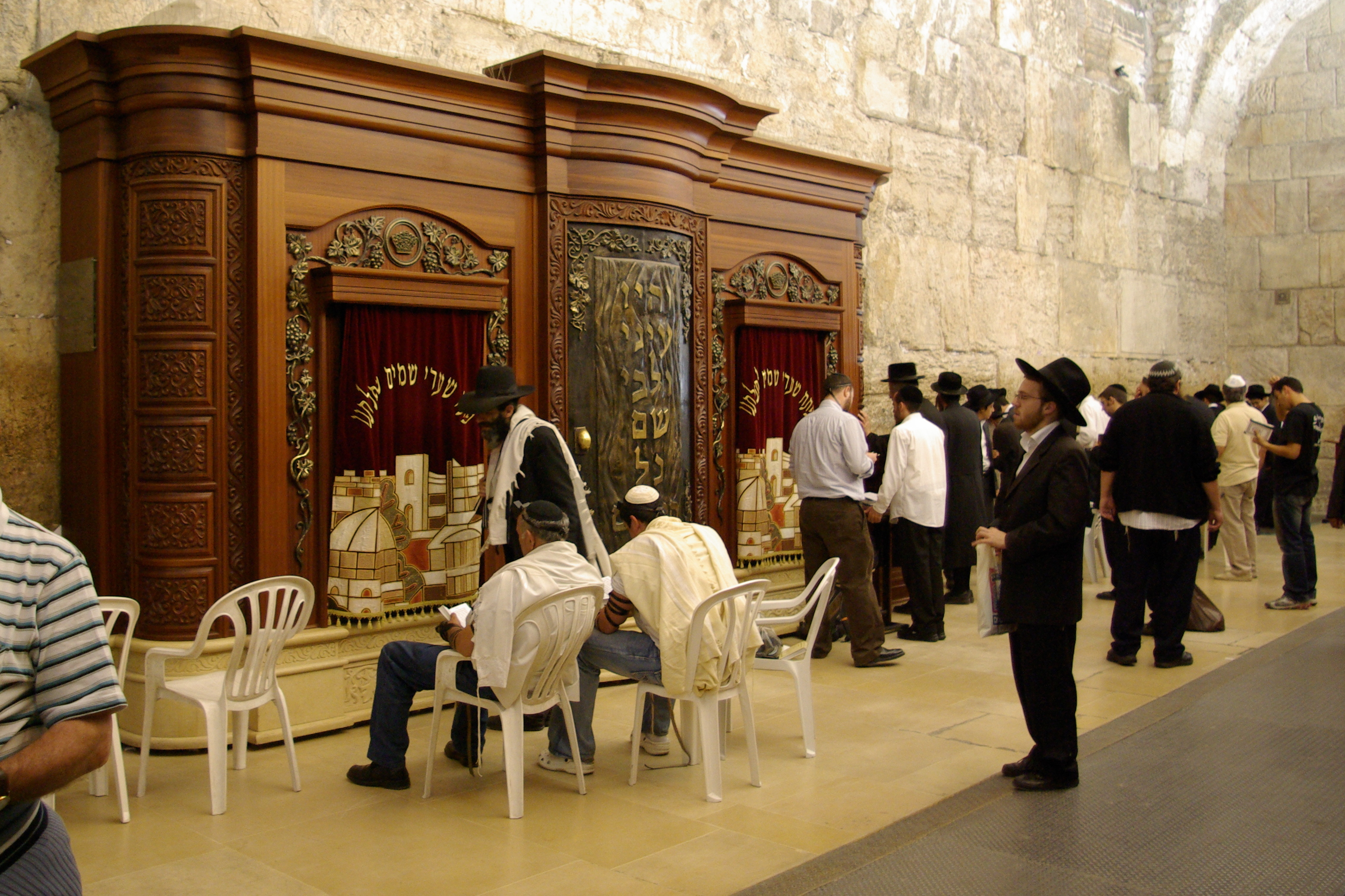
- Torah Ark inside men's section of Wilson's Arch.

Religion
- Affiliation: Judaism
- Ecclesiastical or organisational status: Synagogue
- Year consecrated: 2006
- Status: Active

Location
- Location: Western Wall, Old City of Jerusalem
- Interactive map of Wilson's Arch

Architecture
- Founder: Rabbi Shmuel Rabinovitch
- Funded by: Western Wall Heritage Foundation
- Completed: 1967, 2005-2006 (as a synagogue)

=== 1967 work ===
After the 1967 Six-Day War, as part of the work at the Western Wall tunnels led by the Israel Ministry of Religious Affairs, the space under the arch was prepared to serve as a synagogue. For this purpose it was cleared down to a level c. 7 m below the pinnacle.

=== Renovation and 2006 dedication ===
In 2005, the Western Wall Heritage Foundation initiated a major renovation effort under Rabbi Shmuel Rabinovitch, then-Rabbi of the Wall ("Rabbi of the Kotel", as the title is usually referenced, using the Hebrew word for the Wall). Israeli workers renovated and restored the area for three years, strengthening the arch in preparation for access for visitors and use for prayer. Scaffolding remained in place for over a year to allow workers to remove cement that had been applied as patches over the stone. Part of the restoration work were additions to the men's section, including a Torah ark that can house over one hundred Torah scrolls, in addition to new bookshelves, a library, and heating for the winter and air conditioning for the summer. There is also a new room built for the scribes who maintain and preserve the Torah scrolls used at the Wall. Speakers at the March 12, 2006 dedication ceremony included: President of Israel, Mr. Moshe Katzav, Ashkenazi and Sephardi chief rabbis, Rabbi Yona Metzger and Rabbi Shlomo Amar, the mayor of Jerusalem, Rabbi Uri Lupolianski, the chief rabbi of the Kotel, Rabbi Shmuel Rabinovitch, and the director of The Western Wall Heritage Foundation, Rabbi Mordechai (Suli) Eliav.

=== Women’s section and gallery (2006) ===
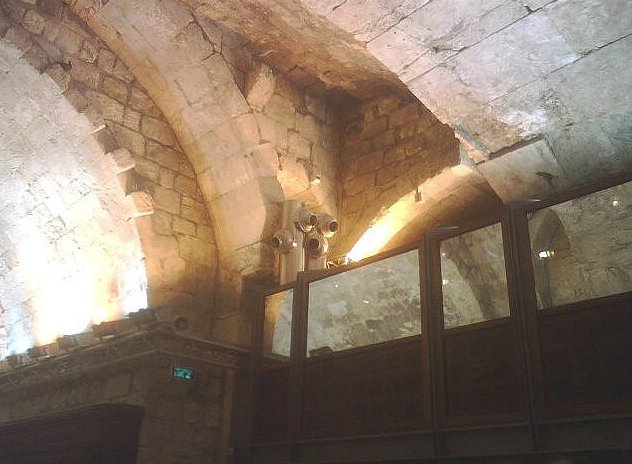
Women's section/balcony, Wilson's Arch prayer area

New construction also included a women's section and gallery, which was dedicated on May 25, 2006, a little more than two months after the March dedication ceremony. While not an officially declared synagogue, this addition creates a women's section to allow separate seating during worship services and special events conducted within the Wilson's Arch prayer area, including Bar Mitzvah ceremonies, and advertisements for special programs such as the middle-of-the-night prayers concluding the six-week "Shovavim" period have made a point of reminding women that this new area exists. According to the Western Wall Heritage Foundation, this construction allowed women for the first time to "take part in the services held inside under the Arch." On May 14, 2008, United States First Lady Laura Bush visited the new women's section during her visit to Israel.

=== Eternal light (2010) ===
On July 25, 2010, a Ner Tamid, an oil-burning "eternal light," was installed within the prayer hall within Wilson's Arch, the first eternal light installed in the area of the Western Wall. According to the Western Wall Heritage Foundation, requests have been made for many years that "an olive oil lamp be placed in the prayer hall of the Western Wall Plaza, as is the custom in Jewish synagogues, to represent the menorah of the Temple in Jerusalem as well as the continuously burning fire on the altar of burnt offerings in front of the Temple, especially in the closest place to where they used to stand."

== Special events ==
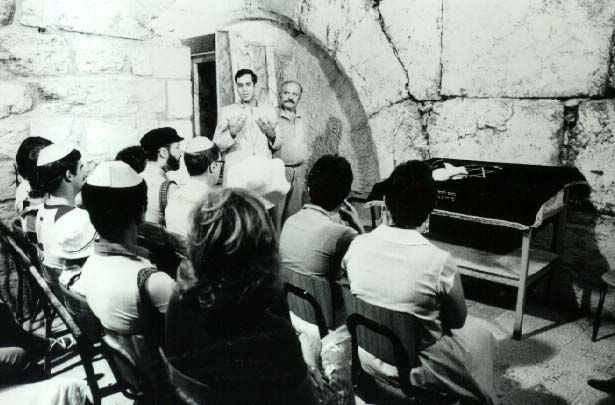
1983 interfaith service

In 1983, a highly unusual interfaith service was conducted in the area under Wilson's Arch—the only one ever to be conducted at the Western Wall since it came under Israeli control. Attended by officers of the U.S. Sixth Fleet and their wives, meaning that men and women were allowed to sit together in what was described ad a small and intimate chapel, it was conducted under the supervision of the Israel Ministry of Religious Affairs, and led by U.S. Navy Chaplain (Rabbi) Arnold Resnicoff. Ministry of Affairs representative Yonatan Yuval was present, responding to press queries that this service was authorized as part of a special welcome for the American Navy.

Since the restoration, a growing number of worship events have been scheduled in the area, to take advantage of the cover and temperature control, especially for services at night that are traditionally recited at the Wall. For example, "Tikkun Chatzot," a kabbalistic midnight prayer for redemption has been conducted there, with a number of public figures in attendance.

The area has also been utilized during times when security concerns make it difficult to allow the use of the outdoor prayer plaza, such as the March 19, 2009 visit of Pope Benedict XVI to the Wall and Temple Mount. Although the Pope's visit coincided with the Jewish festival of Lag B'Omer, the decision had been made to close the Wall and not allow services, but at the request of the Wall's rabbi, Shmuel Rabinovitch, the government allowed worship to be conducted in the area within the Arch. The original decision to close the entire prayer area to Jewish worship was criticised as soon as the decision was announced, one to two months before the visit. Rabbi Rabinowitch, protesting the decision, was quoted as saying that "It's inconceivable that the pope's visit would hurt worshippers at the Western Wall, some of whom have been praying there daily." Part of the reaction was a threat to assemble and protest on the part of some Israelis, saying the police would have to "drag" them out of the area. News articles quoted one comment that, "Just like the visit of a chief rabbi at the Vatican doesn't cause the Vatican to shut down, we expect the same approach when the Pope visits a place holy to the Jewish people." The decision to utilize the prayer area within Wilson's Arch, allowing worship during the Pope's visit, was eventually announced by the Israel Police and the Israel Security Agency (ISA/Shin Bet). Worshippers were allowed into the main plaza during the hours before the Pope's scheduled arrival, but moved into the enclosed Wilson's Arch prayer shortly before he arrived.

Video and audio streaming of some special events are available online from the "Wilson's Arch camera" (webcam). It does not operate on Shabbat, the Jewish Sabbath, or on those Jewish holy days when photography is prohibited by Jewish religious law.

== See also ==
- Excavations at the Temple Mount
- Herod's Temple
- Jerusalem during the Second Temple Period
- List of synagogues in Israel
- Robinson's Arch
- Synagogues of Jerusalem
- Western Wall Tunnel

== Bibliography ==
- Ben-Dov, Meir (1982). The Dig at the Temple Mount (in Hebrew). Jerusalem: Keter. pp. 122–133.
- Ben Dov, Meir (1985). In the Shadow of the Temple. New York, New York: Harper & Row, Publishers. ISBN 0-06-015362-8.
- Mazar, Benjamin (1975). The Mountain of the Lord. Garden City, New York: Doubleday & Company, Inc. ISBN 0-385-04843-2.
- Stern Ephraim, ed. (1993). The Western Wall of the Temple Mount and Remains in the Tyropoeon Valley. The New Encyclopedia of Archaeological Excavations in the Holy Land. Vol. 2. The Israel Exploration Society. pp. 740–42. ISBN 978-0-13-276296-0.
