= Western Wall camera =

Webcam directed at the Western Wall, Old City of Jerusalem

A screenshot of Aish HaTorah's Western Wall camera

A Western Wall camera, also known as a wallcam, is a live webcam that displays action at the Western Wall live as it is taking place.

Some cameras operate all the time. Others refrain from operating during Shabbat and Jewish holy days.

== Operators ==
There are several operators of Western Wall cameras. Some of the operators also provide a service of allowing people to remotely place notes in the wall by entering their prayers on a site, which are then printed and placed in the wall by a volunteer in Jerusalem.

The Western Wall Heritage Foundation is one of the operators. By providing this service, they enable people to view the wall without the expense of traveling there.

Virtual Jerusalem began providing the service 5 December 1996 (the first night of Hanukkah) by installing a camera on a yeshiva opposite the Western Wall Plaza. The camera started filming all action live except on Shabbat and Jewish festivals.

Aish HaTorah provides this service on their site.

== See also ==
- Placing notes in the Western Wall
