= Warren's Gate =

Gate in Jerusalem

Coordinates: 31°46′40″N 35°14′04″E

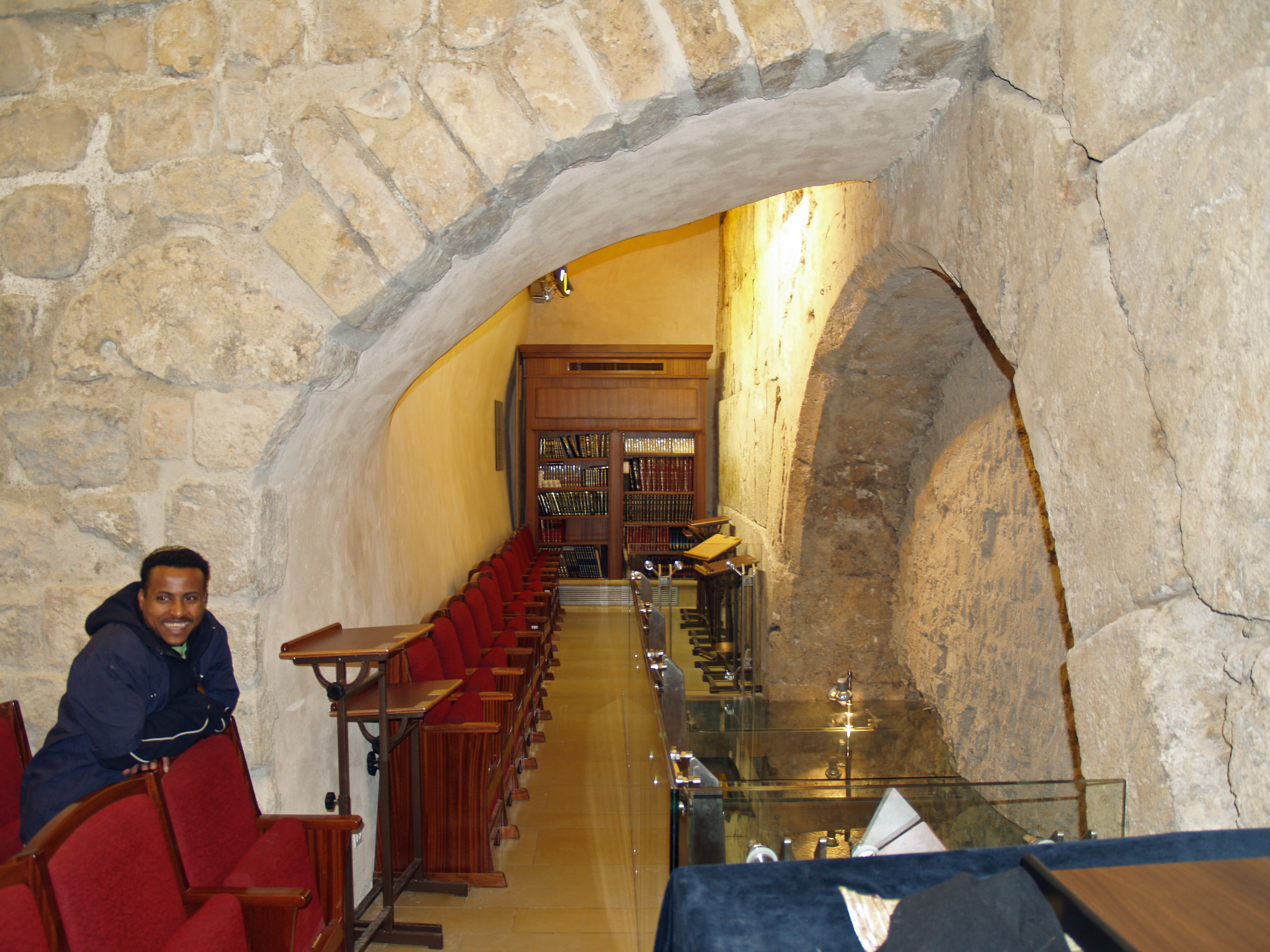
Rav Getz synagogue. The arch to the right belongs to Warren's Gate.

Warren's Gate (Hebrew: שער וורן, romanized: Sha'ar Varen) is an ancient entrance (now sealed) into the Temple platform in Jerusalem. Located about 150 feet (46 m) into the Western Wall Tunnel, the gate was first described by and later named after nineteenth century British surveyor Charles Warren. During the Second Temple period, Warren's Gate led to a tunnel and staircase at the Temple Mount. It is located nearly directly west of the Dome of the Rock along the wall, and as such is nearby to the location believed by some to be the closest accessible point to the Holy of Holies.

== History ==
Following the Rashidun Caliphate conquest of Jerusalem from the Byzantines, Jews were allowed to pray inside the tunnel behind the gate, turning the location into a Jewish synagogue. When the synagogue was destroyed in the First Crusade during the siege of Jerusalem in 1099, the tunnel ended up becoming a water cistern, thus its later name being Cistern 30, so the gate was sealed off.

After the excavation of the Western Wall Tunnel, Rabbi Yehuda Getz, the late official Rabbi of the Western Wall, believed that the point west of the Wall closest to the Holy of Holies was just outside the gate, and that the gate itself could lead there, supposedly being the gate through which priests entered to purify themselves. In July 1981, Getz had a niche carved opposite the site believed to be the location of the Holy of Holies for a small synagogue to commemorate this location. While it was claimed at the time that the eastward tunnel behind the gate discovered by chance during this, Getz actually sought to secretly explore the tunnel in an attempt to locate the Ark of the Covenant, or at least Temple artifacts. Getz's team discovered a 28-meter-long, 6-meter-wide (92 ft × 20 ft) tunnel past the gate extending eastward into the foundations of the Temple Mount, and over the next few weeks, began clearing out mud from it.

However, the amount of people with knowledge of Getz's plan grew, and by August it was announced on Israel Radio. The tunnel attracted a crowd of both Jews and Muslims alike as well as reporters; Getz ordered it boarded up, but it was re-entered. A small underground riot commenced, but soon ended when the Jerusalem police appeared at the scene, restoring peace, and the tunnel was ordered resealed by the Israeli government. Getz's synagogue remains outside it today.

== See also ==
- Excavations at the Temple Mount
- Gates of the Temple Mount
- Western Wall Tunnel riots
