= Western Wall (disambiguation) =

The Western Wall is a sacred Jewish pilgrimage site in Jerusalem.

Western Wall may also refer to:

- Western Wall: The Tucson Sessions, a 1999 album by Linda Ronstadt and Emmylou Harris
- Western Wall Tunnel, a tunnel along the base of the Western Wall
- Little Western Wall, a Jewish religious site in Jerusalem
- Siegfried Line (German: Westwall), a German defensive line along the Franco-German border
- A wall of earth built to contain lava flows at the Fagradalsfjall volcanic eruption in Iceland

== See also ==
- Wailing Wall (disambiguation)
- Kotel (disambiguation)
- Buraq (disambiguation)
