= Rabbi of the Western Wall and the Holy Places =

Part of the Chief Rabbinate of Israel

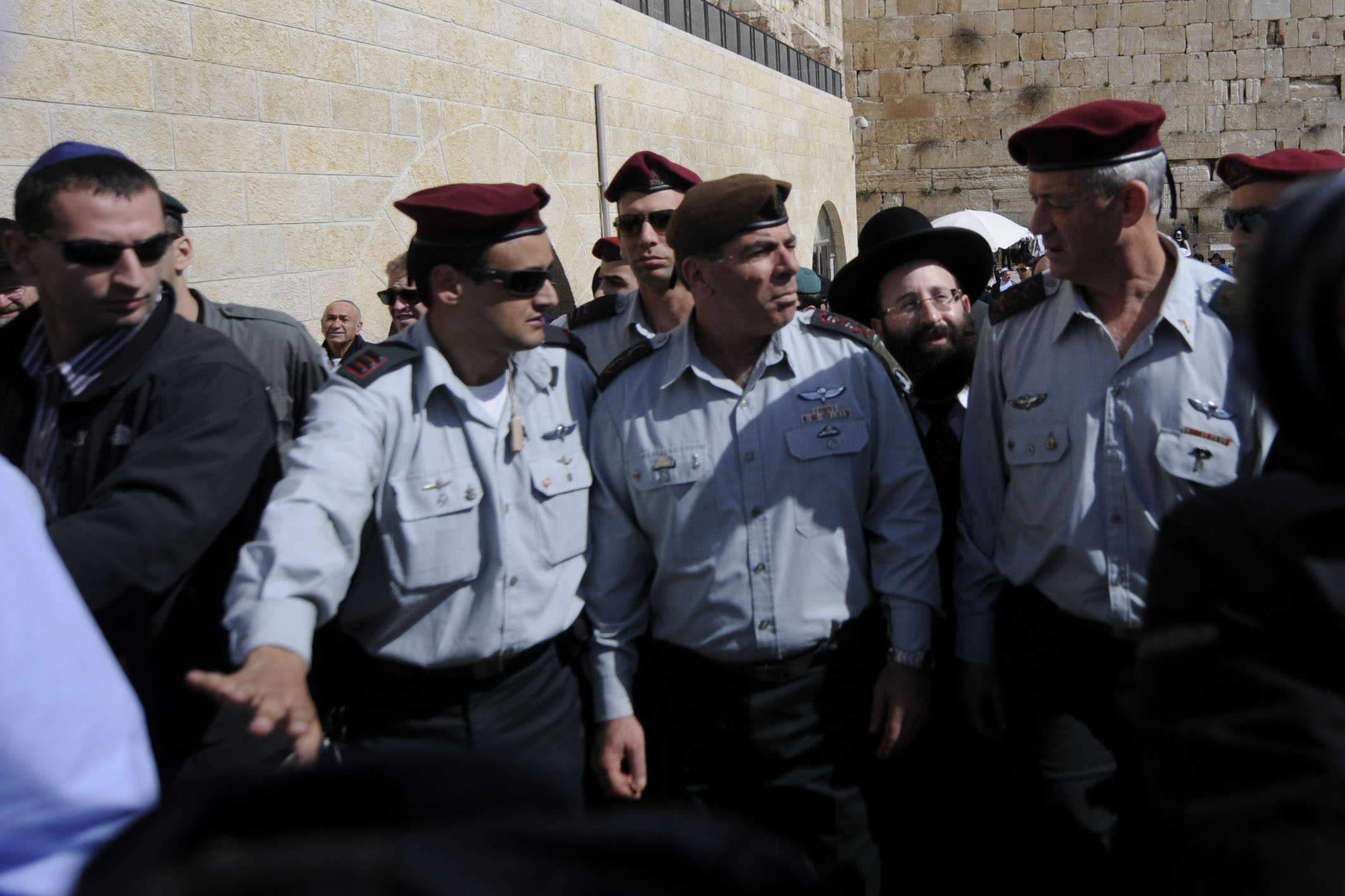
Rabbi of the Western Wall Shmuel Rabinovitch, between Gabi Ashkenazi and Benny Gantz, visiting the Western Wall.

Rabbi of the Western Wall and the Holy Places (in short: Rabbi of the Western Wall) operates under the Chief Rabbinate of Israel, and is responsible for providing religious services to Jews at the Western Wall and other holy places in Israel, listed in the Regulations for the Preservation of Holy Places for Jews, 1981.

As part of his role, the Rabbi of the Western Wall is in charge of enforcing the law on the Preservation of the Holy Places (1967) in places under his supervision, including the prevention of Sabbath desecration, inappropriate attire, begging and interruption of prayer in the Western Wall plaza, and restrictions on the practice of photography at the Western Wall plaza.

The Rabbi of the Western Wall participates in ceremonies that take place in the Western Wall plaza, and is often accompanied by public figures from the around the world who are visiting the Western Wall for the first time.

== Rabbis ==
- Yitzhak Avigdor Orenstein (1930–1948) - Following the Battle of Jerusalem, Jews lost control of the Jewish Quarter, and the position was not reestablished until 1967.
- Yosef Moshe Shechter (1967–1978) - There was no Rabbi of the Western Wall between Schechter's death and Getz's appointment in 1981.
- Yehuda Getz (1981–1995) - There was no Rabbi of the Western Wall between Getz's death in 1995 and Rabinovitch's appointment in 2000.
- Shmuel Rabinovitch (2000–present)
