= Wailing Wall (disambiguation) =

Wailing Wall is a controversial term for the Western Wall of the Temple Mount in Jerusalem.

Wailing Wall may also refer to:

- Wailing Wall (band), a psychedelic rock band
  - Wailing Wall, an album by the band
- Wailing Wall (Melbourne), an historic wall where wharf labourers congregated

== See also ==
- Western Wall (disambiguation)
- The artist Wyland's murals of whales on the sides of buildings have been dubbed "Whaling Walls"
