= Western Wall Tunnel riots =

Violent confrontations between Israeli forces and Palestinians

The Western Wall Tunnel riots erupted on 24 September 1996, lasting primarily for four days, with smaller isolated outbreaks of violence occurring after this period. This conflict was the first between the Israeli Defence Forces (IDF) and the newly created Palestinian National Security Forces (NSF). The protests and riots were initially contained within Jerusalem, but over the week spread to cities and towns across the West Bank and Gaza, resulting in 70 Palestinians and 17 Israeli soldiers being killed along with hundreds of wounded.

The demonstrations started in the morning of 24 September in Old Jerusalem, following the opening of a second entrance into the Western Wall Tunnel in the Via Dolorosa within the Muslim Quarter of the city.

== Historical background ==
The modern history of the tunnels underneath Old Jerusalem started in 1867 when a British Officer named Charles Warren (sent to Palestine by the Palestine Exploration Fund) uncovered passages underneath the Temple Mount. Reactions to the archaeologist's finds from locals were varied, with Jewish religious figures reportedly pleased with discoveries, whilst Christian and Islamic groups were reportedly "horrified" by the site, fearing that the way in which Warren had conducted his excavation threatened to collapse the buildings above. In response to this fear, the passage was sealed by the Ottoman Governor in 1868.

This Status quo remained for a century until the Six-Day War in 1967 when the Israeli army seized central Jerusalem, and Minister of Religions Zerach Warhaftig had the entrance reopened the following year. In the following decades, construction and creation of the tunnel itself took place, which followed the base of the Western Wall.

Strong divisiveness occurred in 1982 when the Rabbi of the Western Wall, Yehuda Getz, had a passage unblocked that led directly underneath the Dome of the Rock. Getz had done so believing the Ark of the Covenant was located below the site within the Second Temple. Once news of the tunnel's opening spread, an underground clash between Arab workers and Jewish students occurred that had to be separated by police, which caused the government to order the passage resealed (as it remains today).

In 1990 the site was partially opened to tourists and worshippers. An issue with the site was that the single entrance meant those who had finished walking down the long passage had to turn back around squeezing past those coming the other way. The Ministry of Tourism repeatedly called for the opening of the second entrance. Whilst the tunnel was expanded towards Via Dolorosa a small distance was left intact awaiting political approval.

Both Prime Ministers Yitzhak Rabin and Shimon Peres refused to open the entrance seeing the benefits of tourism as being outweighed by the negative effects on the peace process.

== Timeline ==
=== 24 September ===
Around Midnight on 23 September, a group of workers led by Dan Bahat, and guarded by Israeli police, set about opening the entrance from Via Dolorosa Street. Once opened they constructed a fake wall in front of the passage to be broken by the mayor in an opening ceremony the next day.

The following morning Mayor Ehud Olmert, surrounded by Jewish religious leaders and politicians, announced the opening of the passage, taking a sledgehammer to the fake wall and revealing it. Attending the gathering was Grand Mufti Ekrima Sa'id Sabri who, according to Yisrael Hasson (deputy director of Shin Bet), immediately called President Yasser Arafat, saying "the Jews were digging under the Temple Mount.”

Within hours, hundreds of Palestinians were protesting in the streets of Jerusalem, but were prevented from reaching the entrance of the tunnel by Israeli police using rubber bullets. A group of youths threw stones down onto the Western Wall Plaza towards Jewish worshippers, resulting in Police evacuating and closing both the Plaza and the Temple Mount compound.

=== 25 September ===
On Thursday, violence erupted in Ramallah. Around a thousand students marched from Bir Zeit University in the direction of Jerusalem and reached an Israeli checkpoint at the border between the Palestinian Authority and Israel. The students and others threw stones towards the soldiers at the checkpoint, who responded by firing guns into the air and then firing rubber bullets into the crowd. Palestinian police failed in their attempt to hold back the protestors and pulled back. At 3.55 pm a burst of gunfire came from the Palestinian side, with Israeli soldiers returning fire with live ammunition, and a full firefight between Palestinian police and Israeli forces commenced. According to Palestinians, as well as Western diplomats, the gunfire began when Israeli forces entered Palestinian territory (something the Israeli government denied). This continued until 6 pm when leaders of both sides met and agreed to a mutual withdrawal.

A similar event occurred in Bethlehem where a protest progressed into stone-throwing at Israeli soldiers near the site of Rachel’s Tomb. According to Israeli sources, someone on the Palestinian side opened fire on the soldiers who then returned fire, with Palestinian police subsequently joining in. The violence once again ended with a mutually agreed ceasefire.

This day marked the first conflict between Israeli forces and the Palestinian National Security Forces, which had been created by the Oslo accords in 1993. The allowance of armed police under the Palestinian Authority had been an aspect of the Oslo accords that was particularly contentious and served to harden the views who opposed the process.

=== 26 September ===
Prime Minister Benjamin Netanyahu cut short a tour of European capitals, returning to Israel late Wednesday in response to the outbreak of violence. After meeting overnight the cabinet made a statement on Thursday morning blaming the Palestinian authorities for the violence. The statement read that "The Government of Israel is demanding of the Palestinian Authority to cease the incitement and to restrain the violent activity in its territory against Israeli civilians and Israeli army soldiers"

In Nablus, Palestinian protesters attacked the Tomb of Joseph, a walled enclave within the city that remained under Israeli control and used for religious education. The attack resulted in the deaths of 6 Israeli soldiers and ended with a ceasefire and Palestinian forces agreeing to evacuate the Israeli forces from the compound. However, Israel refused to abandon the site leading to Palestinian forces protecting the site overnight.

In Gaza, thousands of Palestinians marched on Jewish settlements in the region and the Egyptian border. The resulting gunfights left one Egyptian soldier dead (it is unclear who killed them).

Protesters in Jerusalem attempted to reach the Old City but were driven back by police.

In Ramallah, in the West Bank, outbreaks of fighting occurred with Palestinian police trying and failing to hold back crowds. The fighting included the deployment and use of tanks and helicopters by the Israeli side.

=== 27 September ===
Clashes intensified even further on Friday 27 September. On the morning of the 27th, a large group of riot police was stationed near the Temple Mount compound. Following noon prayers, a group of Palestinian youths started throwing rocks towards a group of police. Police responded by storming the Haram al-Sharif compound, utilising tear gas, rubber bullets, and (as claimed by the Palestinians) live ammunition. Whilst the police claimed their officers had come under "massive stone throwing", both witnesses and reporters present at the scene claimed only a few rocks were thrown before police stormed the compound.

The actions of Palestinian police notably changed on Friday. Whereas the previous day had witnessed direct conflicts between Palestinian police and Israeli forces from this point onward Palestinian forces were focused on attempting to hold back crowds (although often unsuccessfully). On the morning of the 26th, according to Palestinian sources, President Arafat had issued commands to forces to try and stop attacks against Israelis.

Violence broke out across towns and cities in the West Bank, and Palestinian demonstrators clashed with Palestinian police. In Bethlehem, Palestinian police formed a wall to prevent a crowd from reaching the site of Racheal’s Tomb. In Jenin and Ramallah, similar clashes occurred with police attempting to prevent crowds from reaching Israeli checkpoints and roadblocks. In Jericho, Palestinian police failed to contain the crowds who marched on a checkpoint clashing with Israeli police resulting in three Palestinians being shot dead. In Tulkarm, a group attacked a border police post which resulted in the deaths of 2 Israelis and 1 Palestinian. Police responded to this attack by firing on the group from helicopters.

In Rafah, a town on the southern border of the Gaza strip, a group of Palestinians following noon prayers marched on a border post. The resulting violence left at least one Israeli officer dead and the withdrawal of Israeli forces from the position. Subsequently, a Palestinian flag was raised at the post and a hole was cut in the fence where Palestinians reportedly greeted Egyptians on the other side.

== United Nations Response ==
The UN Security Council met at 11 am on the 27th to discuss the events. The US, whilst in attendance, was publicly resistant to the meeting claiming it would serve little purpose. State Department spokesman Nicholas Burns said of the meeting that "the United States does not believe that endless rhetoric and endless debate thousands of miles away from this conflict are really going to do the trick".

US President Bill Clinton called on Prime Minister Netanyahu to make a concession to the Palestinian side such as resealing the entrance, as President Arafat was unwilling to commit to any summit meetings without such a gesture. In response, Netanyahu stated that he "did not regret that we opened the Western Wall Tunnel, which has no effect on the Temple Mount, and expresses our sovereignty over Jerusalem,".

The following day the UN security council met again to pass a resolution on the matter, the US abstained from the vote in a relatively rare occurrence. The Council adopted United Nations Security Council Resolution 1073 by 14 votes to 0 with the US abstention, which called for Israel to seek "the immediate cessation and reversal of all acts which have resulted in the aggravation of the situation."

== See also ==
- 1990 Temple Mount killings
