= Western Stone =

Monolithic block of the Western Wall in Jerusalem

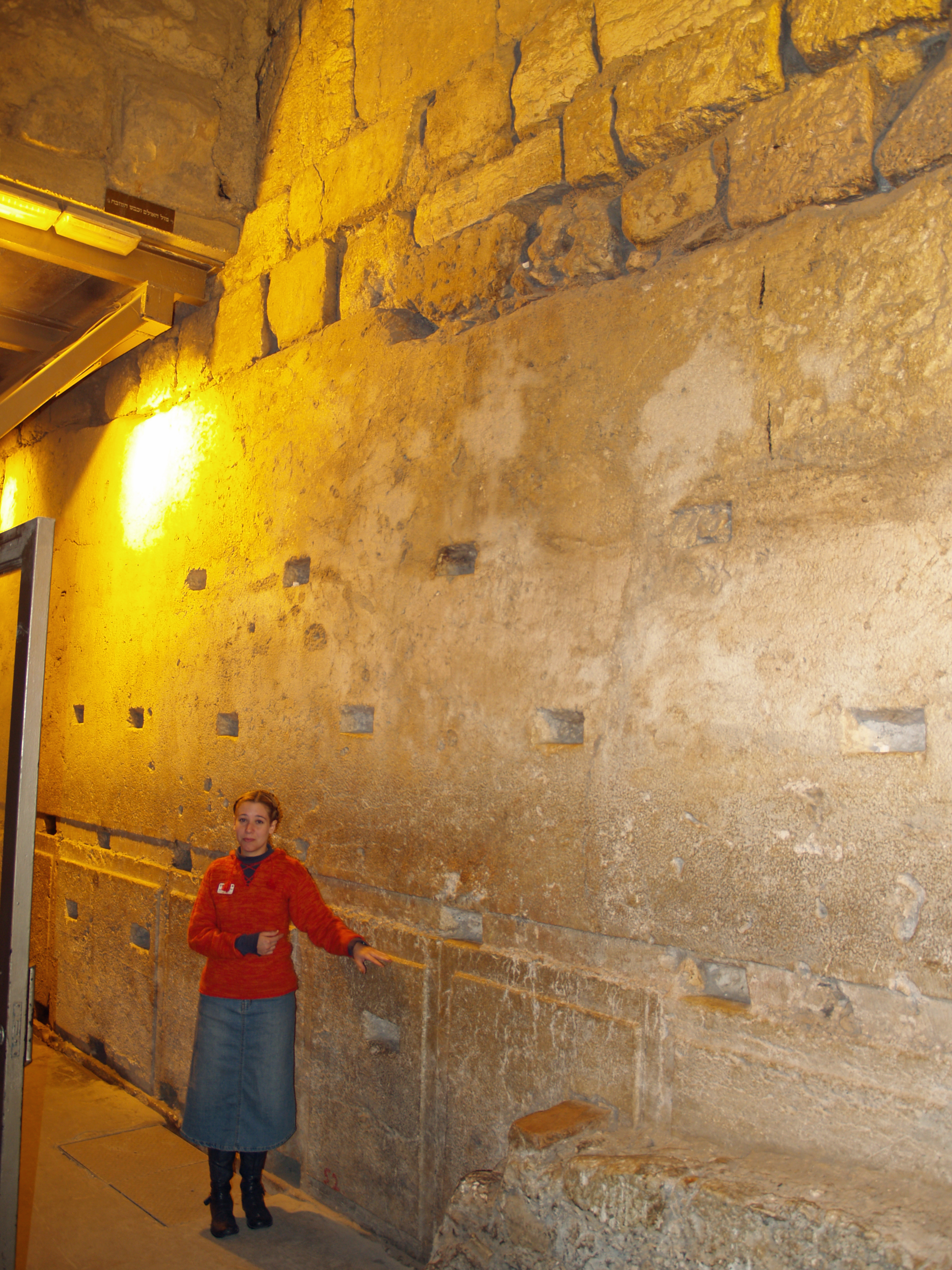
The Western Stone, beginning at shoulder level of the guide

The Western Stone is a monolithic ashlar (worked stone block) forming part of the lower level of the Western Wall in Jerusalem. This largest stone in the Western Wall is visible within the Western Wall Tunnel. It is one of the largest building blocks in the world.

== Dimensions ==
=== Exposed face ===
The stone's exposed face can be freely measured and is 13.55 metres (44.5 ft) long and 3.3 metres (11 ft) high, but its width, or depth, is hidden within the wall.

=== Depth ===
In June 2006, Harry M. Jol, from the University of Wisconsin–Eau Claire, performed measurements with ground-penetrating radar (GPR) to determine the depth of the stone. The conclusion of his team was that its depth ranges from approximately 1.8 to 2.5 metres (5.9 to 8.2 ft). Prior estimates ranged up to 16.5m.

=== Weight ===
The calculated weight of the stone block is of 250–300 tonnes, based on Jol's measurement. Prior to Jol's GPR measurement, the stone was estimated to weigh between 550 and 600 tonnes.

=== Pre-2006 estimates ===
A previous estimate of the stone's depth was 16.5 metres (54 ft), a multiple of the GPR measurement, and led to a calculated total weight of 567 tonnes.; Other pre-2006 sources circulated similar figures, namely 550 to 600 tonnes. The Western Wall Heritage Foundation (WWHF) website indicates, as of March 2020, an estimated depth of 2–4.6 metres (6.6–15.1 ft), with an estimated weight of "several hundred tons", thus moderating its former estimated weight of 517 tonnes (570 short tons);

== Location ==
The stone is located in a section of the Western Wall (in the broader meaning of the term) north of Wilson's Arch, below ground level, and can be accessed through the Western Wall tunnels. It is part of the "Great Course", a name used by the WWHF for the tallest and longest course (layer of stones) of the Western Wall. Its stone blocks are of Herodian age, and the stones next to the Western Stone are, in sequence, 2 metres (6.6 ft), 12.12 metres (39.8 ft), and 8 metres (26 ft) long, respectively.

== See also ==
- Herodian architecture
- Archaeology of Israel
- Stone of the Pregnant Woman
