= Shmuel Zuckerman =

Jewish printer (1856–1929)

- שמואל צוקערמאן
- Born: 1856; Międzyrzec Podlaski, Congress Poland
- Died: March 18, 1929 (aged 72–73); Jerusalem, Mandatory Palestine
- Occupation: Printer
- Organization: Zuckerman Printing
- Spouse: Hadassah Sharlin (married 1872–1929)
- Children: 11

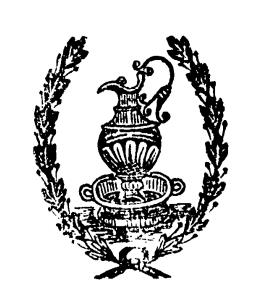
Zuckerman Printing Logo

Shmuel Ha'levi Zuckerman (Yiddish: שמואל צוקערמאן; Hebrew: שמואל צוקרמן; 1856 – March 18, 1929) was a Jewish printer and publisher in Jerusalem during the 19th and 20th centuries. He was the founder of Zuckerman Printing, publisher of the monthly issue Torah of Zion, and one of the heads of the committee that established Beit Yisrael in the 1880s.

== Early life ==
Zuckerman was born in 1856 in Mezeritch Podlasky, Congress Poland, to rabbi Yaakov Zuckerman (known as rabbi Yokel Le'ader Handeler) and Sarah bat Yitzhak Hacohen. He made aliyah the Land of Israel with his parents and older brother Gabriel in 1863. He began studying at yeshiva when they arrived in Jerusalem, and he became one of the senior students of Shlomo Zalman Lavi, the founder of Mea Shearim.

He was married to a girl from Jerusalem on the night of his Bar Mitzvah, as was customary during the time period, but the marriage did not succeed. He divorced after two years and went back to study at yeshiva. He married again at age 16, to Hadassah Sharlin, daughter of rabbi Nissim Sharlin of Shklov. They had ten daughters and one son.

== Career ==
Zuckerman began working in the printing press of Yisrael Bak, along with his brother. Shortly thereafter, he became the director of the press and continued after Bak's death, when his son, Nisan Bak, took over. Following the breakout of the eleventh Russo-Turkish War in 1877, he immigrated to London and worked at Abrahams printing house.

He returned to Jerusalem in 1880, and established a new printing house three years later, with five Sephardic rabbis, including rabbi Nachman Batito. Shortly after that, the partners retired and Zuckerman retained the printing house. During this time, his daughter fell ill with diphtheria, and he spent a lot of money to keep her healthy, but she died in 1885.

He established a branch of the printing house in New York City, but it closed after seven months, and he returned to Jerusalem again. Upon his return, he brought back a small leg machine for printing in color, and supplies containing many Hebrew and foreign-lettered printing blocks. In addition, he brought the printing press given to Bak by Moses Montefiore. His printing house, Zuckerman Printing, became a pioneering business in Jerusalem and employed 10 workers. He was the first in the land to print in color. He purchased Torah of Zion, a monthly Torah magazine, in 1887. The magazine initially printed 500 copies, and he served as the editorial coordinator, while his father-in-law, Yaakov Orenstein, was the editor-in-chief.

He helped establish the Beit Yisrael and Zichron Tuvia neighborhoods in the city of Jerusalem. He was Haredi, and dressed in the old Ashkenazi style of Jewish garb. He never printed anything that was inconsistent with his religions views. He died on March 18th, 1929, and was buried in the Mount of Olives Jewish Cemetery.

== Legacy ==
Zuckerman's son, Chaim Yaakov, continued to operate the printing house after his death. One of his grandchildren, Dr. David Zuckerman, a clinical psychologist who served as a senior advisor at the Ministry of Education and headed the Department of Educational Counseling at Bar-Ilan University. His daughter, Raizel, was married to Yitzhak Avigdor Orenstein.

His Judaica prints are highly valued and have been sold in auctions at Sotheby's.
