= Yitzhak Avigdor Orenstein =

Israeli rabbi and politician (1893–1948)

- יצחק אביגדור אורנשטיין
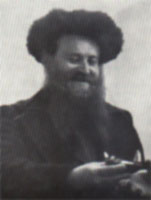
- Born: June 18, 1893; Jerusalem, Ottoman Empire
- Died: May 23, 1948 (aged 54); Jewish Quarter, Jerusalem, Israel
- Cause of death: Killed in action
- Burial place: Mount of Olives Jewish Cemetery
- Years active: 1919–1948
- Organization: Colel Chabad
- Title: Rabbi of the Western Wall and the Holy Places

Yitzhak Avigdor Orenstein (Hebrew: יצחק אביגדור אורנשטיין; June 18, 1893 – May 23, 1948) was an Israeli politician, and the first rabbi of the Western Wall. He is widely considered in Israel to be a martyr in the founding of Israel.

== Early life and education ==
Orenstein was born in Jerusalem as a descendant of the Rivlin family, to Rabbi Moshe Yehuda Leib Orenstein and Shoshana Raizel, daughter of Shmuel Zuckerman. As a child, he studied at various Yeshivas across Jerusalem, such as Yeshiva Torat Emet, run by the local Chabad chapter, being one of the first members of the school prior to its closure during the outbreak of World War I.

During the war, when the Yishuv in Jerusalem was stricken with various epidemics and food insecurity, he took part in missions on behalf of the needy and worked with the Committee for Aid to the Jews of Jerusalem. Using his Ottoman citizenship, he helped hide Jewish migrants of the Old Yishuv from the authorities by moving them out of the city and into the country for protection from conscription into the Ottoman army. In 1915, he married Mushka Liba, daughter of Rabbi Ashker Yitzhak Weidman and Bluma Slonim, a fellow Ottoman Jew. She was a 5th generation descendant of Rabbi Shlomo Zalman Zoref. On her mother's side, she was a descendant of Dovber Schneuri.

== Adulthood and career ==
In 1919, Orenstein began publishing HaDvir, a monthly magazine for the subjects of Torah and Eretz Yisroel, discussing literary topics as well as public affairs concerns. In 1925, he and his wife were founding members of the Neve Yaakov colony, which he again fled to during the 1929 pogroms. In 1929, he met with the Reichin Rebbe, who offered him a secretarial position in Riga, which he declined due to his declining interest in Europe.

In 1930, he was appointed by the Chief Rabbinate to the position of Rabbi of the Western Wall and the Holy Places. He served in the position until the fall of the Jewish Quarter in the War for Independence. Concurrently, he became a member of Colel Chabad, and helped aid poor Jewish families in Israel, eventually becoming a director of the organization. In 1940, he moved with his family to the Old CIty, where he and his wife took a more active role in the philanthropy of the city.

In 1945, he founded Midrash Shmuel Yeshiva, named after Rabbi Shmuel Schneersohn; the president of the yeshiva was Rabbi Yosef Yitzhak Schneersohn. Orenstein served as the Rosh Yeshiva and on the board with Alexander Yudasin until its closure in 1948.

== Death and family ==
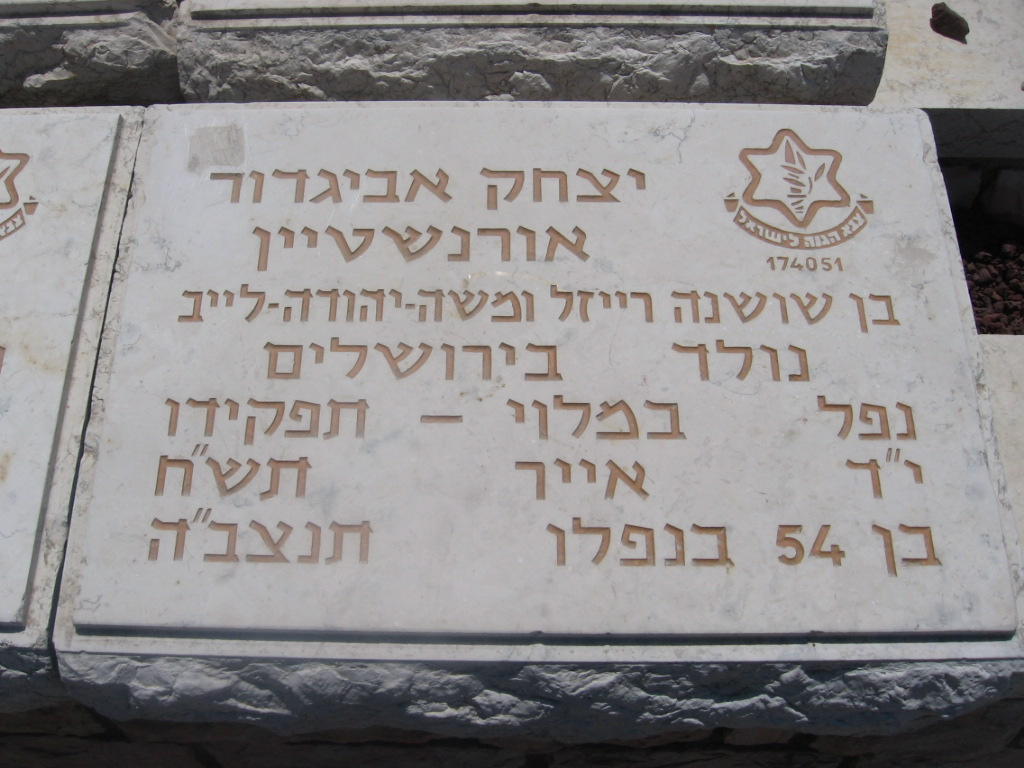
Orenstein's tomb in the mass grave at the Mount of Olives Jewish Cemetery

During the Arab siege of the Old City during the 1948 Palestine war, Orenstein was responsible for the administrative affairs of all the residents of the Jewish Quarter. He and his wife worked devotedly to the safekeeping of the neighborhood. They were killed by artillery fire in the invasion and were put in a mass grave in the quarter. When the news of his death was received, Yitzhak Ben-Zvi set a telegram to David Ben-Gurion statying, "A great minister has fallen today in Israel." He and his wife were survived by two daughters and four sons, all whom took a role in the Israeli War of Independence.

In 1967, both Orenstein and his wife were transferred to the Mount of Olives Cemetery for a proper burial, and his name was engraved in the Memorial for the Defenders of the Old City of Jerusalem on Mount Herzl.

== Sources ==
- אבן-אור, שמואל (1968). יומן הכותל המערבי [Western Wall Journal] (in Hebrew). Jerusalem: בית אורנשטין.

Preceded by None (position established)	Rabbi of the Western Wall and the Holy Places; 1930–1948	Succeeded by Yosef Moshe Shechter
