= Kotel =

Kotel may refer to:

- Western Wall, or Kotel in Hebrew, a wall of the Jewish Temple in Jerusalem
- Kotel, Bulgaria, a town in Bulgaria
- Kotel Pass, a mountain pass in Bulgaria
- Kotel Gap, a saddle in the South Shetland Islands, Antarctica
- Kotel, Sodražica, a settlement in Slovenia
- Kotel, a peak in the Giant Mountains in the Czech Republic

== See also ==
- Western Wall (disambiguation)
