= Dan Bahat =

Israeli archaeologist (born 1938)

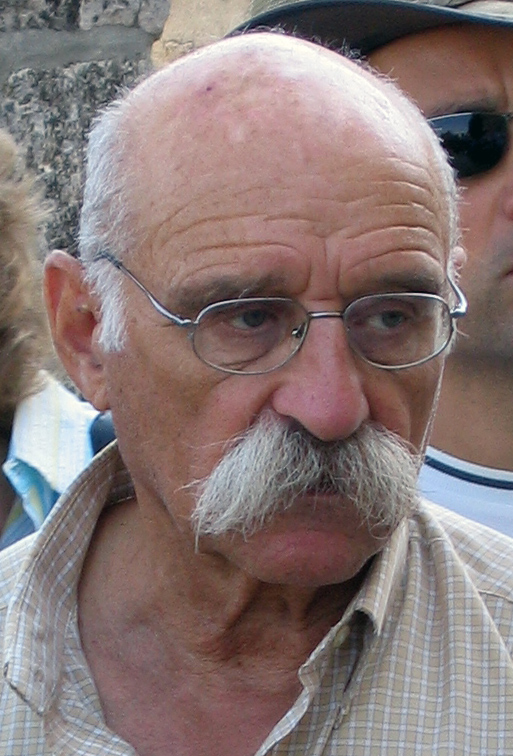
Dan Bahat in 1999

Dan Bahat (Hebrew: דן בהט; born 1938 in Lviv in Poland) is an Israeli archaeologist especially known for his excavations in Jerusalem, particularly at the Western Wall tunnels.

== Biography ==
Dan Bahat was born in Poland to Polish Jewish parents who were citizens of Mandatory Palestine. The family moved to Tel Aviv in 1939 and became Israeli citizens in 1952. He served in the IDF from 1956 to 1958. In 1964 he gained a Bachelor's degree in archaeology and Jewish history at the Hebrew University of Jerusalem. He finished his master's degree in 1978. In 1990 he obtained the PhD degree from the Hebrew University on the topic "Topography and Toponymy of Crusader Jerusalem" under the supervision of Joshua Prawer.

== Academic and archaeology career ==
Between 1963 and 1990 Bahat was employed by the Israel Government's Department of Antiquities, Ministry of Culture and Education, including as the District Archeologist of Jerusalem.

He taught until 2004 at Bar-Ilan University, Israel, and he is currently teaching at St. Michael College, University of Toronto, Canada.

=== Archaeological projects ===
==== Western Wall Tunnels ====
Bahat was the head of archaeological research at the Western Wall tunnels between 1986–2007.

In January 1992, Dan Bahat published the IAA's archaeological finding of the Western Stone, the largest ashlar stone found to date in Israel, at ca. 10–12 metres above the base of the Temple Mount's Western Wall. The stone measures 13.6 metres (45 ft) in length, presumably 4.6 metres (15 ft) in depth, 3.5 metres (11 ft) in height, and is estimated at weighing ca. 517 tonnes (570 short tons), the world's third largest block of stone used in building.

==== Tel Yavne: Ibelin Castle ====
Bahat led the two-season dig at Tel Yavne, unearthing remains of the Crusader castle of the Ibelin family.

== Published works ==
- Dan Bahat (1976). Twenty Centuries of Jewish Life in the Holy Land: The Forgotten Generations. The Israel Economist.
- Dan Bahat (1990). The Illustrated Atlas of Jerusalem. Simon & Schuster. ISBN 978-0134516424.
- Dan Bahat (2002). The Western Wall Tunnels: Touching The Stones of Our Heritage. Israel MOD/The Western Wall Heritage Foundation. ISBN 978-9650512071.
- Dan Bahat (2004). The Atlas of Biblical Jerusalem. Carta. ISBN 978-0134516424.
- Dan Bahat and Chaim T. Rubinstein (2011). The Carta Jerusalem Atlas (formerly: Illustrated Atlas of Jerusalem). Carta, the Israel Map & Pub Co Ltd. ISBN 978-9652208071.
- Dan Bahat (2013). The Jerusalem western wall tunnel. Israel Exploration Society. ISBN 978-965-221-091-3.
