= Shmuel Rabinovitch =

Israeli Rabbi

Rabbi Samuel Rabinowitz 'שמואל רבינוביץ
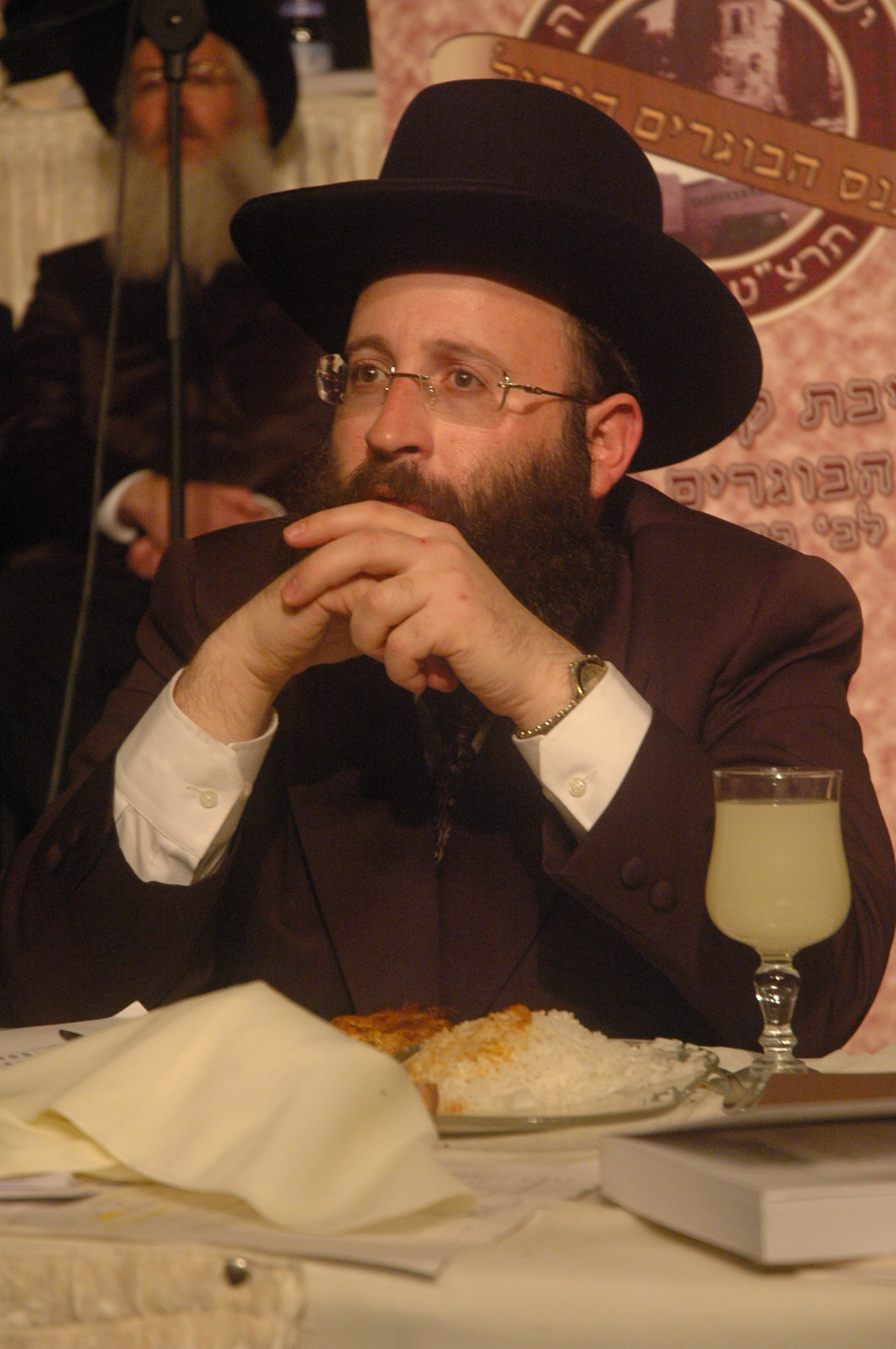
- Rabbi Samuel Rabinowitz
- Title: Rabbi of the Western Wall and the Holy Sites of Israel

Personal life
- Born: Shmuel Rabinovitch; April 4, 1970 (age 56) Jerusalem
- Children: 7
- Parent(s): Rabbi Chaim Yehuda and Chenka Yuta Rabinovitch
- Education: Kol Torah

Religious life
- Religion: Judaism
- Denomination: Haredi

Jewish leader
- Predecessor: Rabbi Meir Yehuda Getz
- Position: Rabbi
- Synagogue: Western Wall
- Organisation: Western Wall
- Began: 1995
- Other: Chairman, The Western Wall Heritage Foundation
- Residence: Ezrat Torah

Shmuel Rabinovitch, also spelled Rabinowitz (Hebrew: 'שמואל רבינוביץ; born 4 April 1970, Jerusalem) is an Orthodox rabbi and Rabbi of the Western Wall and the Holy Sites of Israel. In his duties as Rabbi of the Wall in the Old City of Jerusalem, Rabbi Rabinovich maintains the historic traditional Jewish practices of the Wall as a site of orthodox Jewish prayer and ensures that notes placed in the Wall are removed and treated consistent with tradition and halakhah. He escorts visiting heads of state and foreign dignitaries during visits to the Wall, and has published on the Jewish laws and customs of the Western Wall.

== Rabbinic career ==
Rabinovitch was appointed to the position of Rabbi of the Western Wall in 1995 by Israeli Prime Minister Yitzhak Rabin and the chief rabbis of Israel following the death of Rabbi Meir Yehuda Getz, his predecessor as Rabbi of the Wall. Rabinovitch is the fourth occupant of the office; the first was Rabbi Yitzchak Avigdor Orenstein, who was installed by the British during Mandatory Palestine, the second was Rabbi Schechter, and the third was Getz.

Rabinovitch is responsible for maintaining the site as a sacred religious prayer space in the Jewish tradition. The Western Wall is visited by individuals of diverse backgrounds. Rabbi Rabinovitch navigates the Wall's use a religious prayer site with the interests of the civic programs of the secular Israeli state, visits by state dignitaries, religious leaders of other faiths, and diaspora liberal Jewish groups. Twice a year, Rabinovitch and his staff collect the thousands of prayer notes placed in the Wall, which they consider and treat as sacred writing that may not be disposed of with common trash, and bury them in the Jewish cemetery on the Mount of Olives.

Rabinovitch has maintained the historic and traditional gender separation at the Wall, conforming to orthodox Jewish practice. In 2009, he authorized the arrest of a female political activist praying with a tallit, the Jewish prayer shawl considered men's clothing in Judaism, and holding a Sefer Torah. Rabbi Rabinowitz described this as "...an act of provocation that seeks to turn the Western Wall into disputed territory... A prayer that causes contention and desecration of the sanctity of the Western Wall has no value. It is an act of protest".

Rabinovitch requests that visiting Christian clergy cover their crucifixes when visiting the Wall, and clergy of other faiths cover their symbols. In May 2008, Rabinovitch requested that a delegation of Roman Catholic clergy not visit the Wall so long as they wore visible crosses. In 2009, Rabinovitch declined the request of Pope Benedict XVI to clear the area of Jewish worshippers upon the pontiff's visit to the Western Wall. Rabinovich requested that the pope cover the cross he wears around his neck but the state Israeli diplomatic office overruled the rabbi.

He escorted US First Lady Laura Bush, together with Gila Katsav, wife of President of Israel Moshe Katsav, on a visit in 2005, and Sarah Palin, former Governor of Alaska, in 2011. In July 2008, Rabinovitch accompanied U.S. presidential candidate Barack Obama on a pre-dawn visit to the Wall. During this visit, Obama placed a prayer note in the Wall. After Senator Obama and his entourage departed, his note was removed from the Wall by a seminary student who sold it to the Maariv newspaper which published the note. Rabinovitch condemned the action of the seminary student for violating the privacy inherent in notes placed in the Wall.

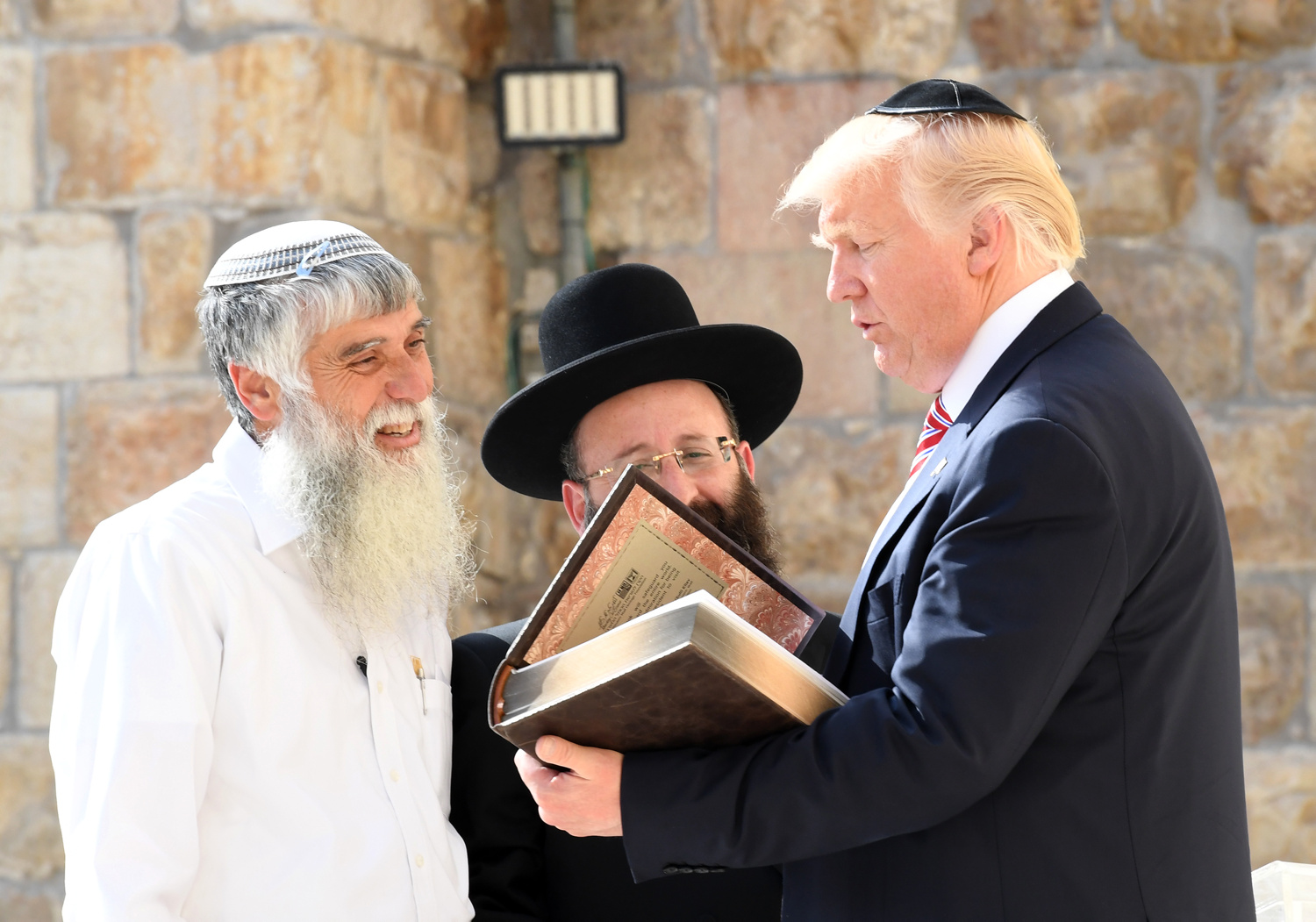
U.S. president Donald Trump visiting the Western Wall in 2017, accompanied by Rabinovitch

Rabinovitch is the chairman of The Western Wall Heritage Foundation, a government-mandated organization which preserves and develops the Western Wall site and Western Wall Tunnel, as well as promotes the value of the site through education. Rabinovitch has also headed a public commission for environmental quality, and supervision and licensing of burials in Israel. He is a former vice president of the Aleh Children's Home in Jerusalem.

== Published works ==
Rabinovitch wrote the two-volume Sheilos u'Teshuvos Shaarei Tzion, describing the many halakhic questions that have arisen at the Western Wall and other holy sites. One chapter in Volume 1 deals exclusively with the question of disposing of the prayer notes inserted in the stones of the Wall. Rabinovitch rules that burning is a "pure" way to deal with the notes, but burying them is more honorable. He is also the author of Minhagei HaKotel, a book on the history and customs of the Western Wall.
