= Placing notes in the Western Wall =

Practice generally associated to Jewish pious belief

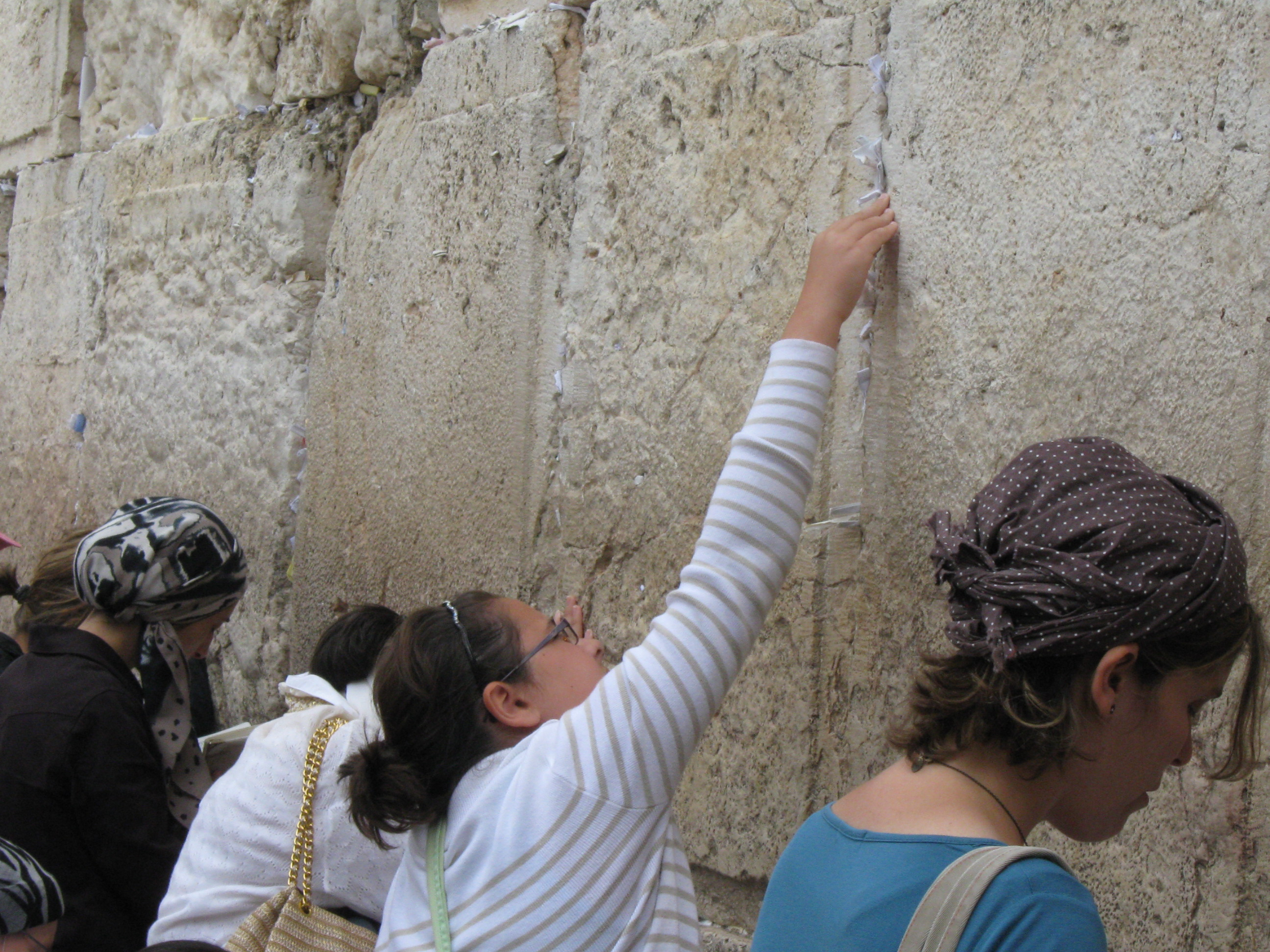
A girl places a note into a crack of the Western Wall in Jerusalem.

Placing notes in the Western Wall refers to the practice of placing slips of paper containing written prayers to God into the cracks of the Western Wall, a Jewish holy site in the Old City of Jerusalem.

It is claimed that occurrence of such a phenomenon dates from the early 18th century and stems from the Jewish tradition that the Divine Presence rests upon the Western Wall. There is a dispute as to whether it is permissible according to Jewish law to insert slips of paper in to the crevices. Some argue that the practice debases the holiness of the Wall and that the placement of notes should be discontinued.

== History ==
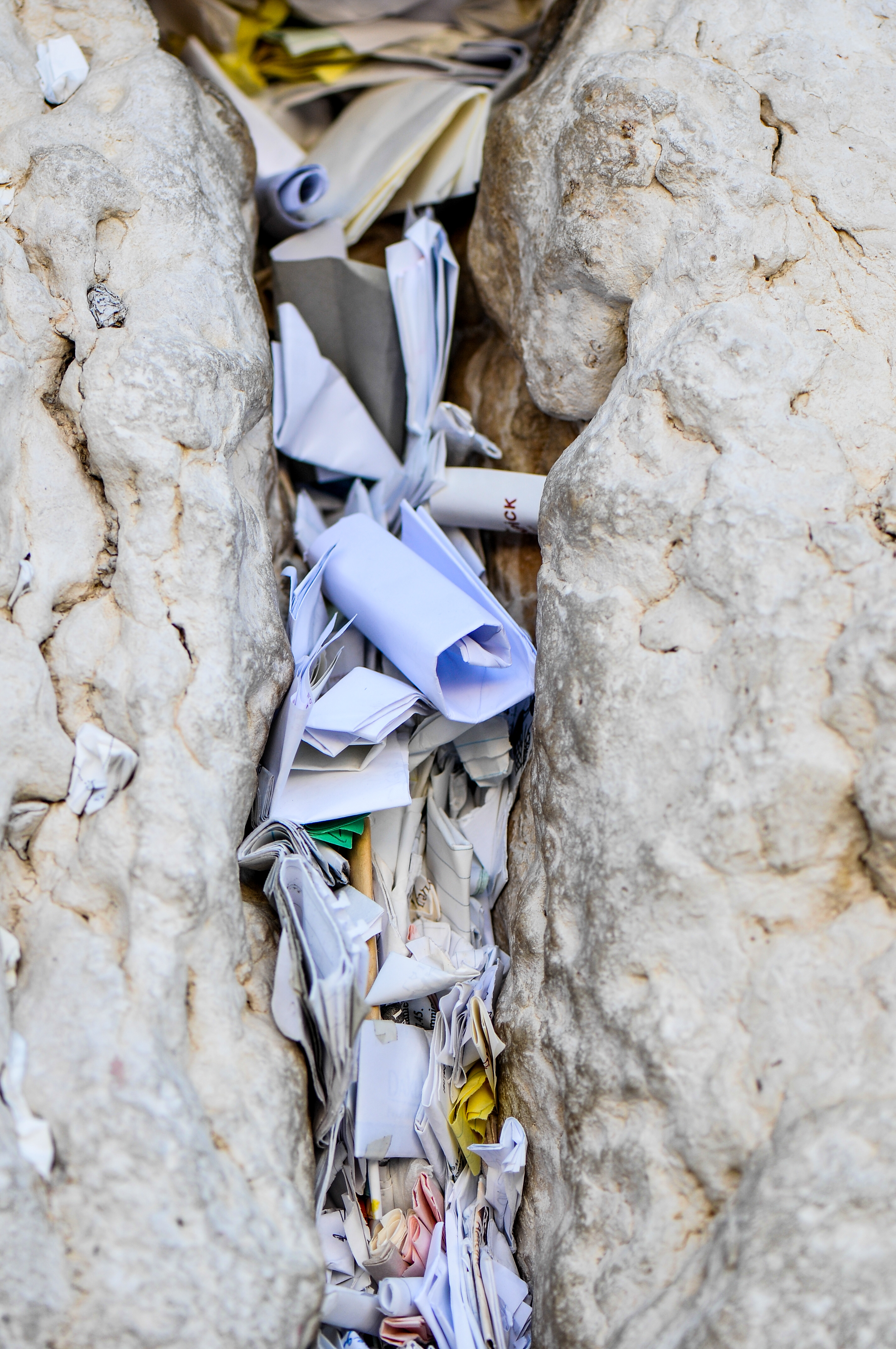
Notes wedged into the cracks of the Western Wall.

The earliest account of placing prayer notes into the cracks and crevices of the Western Wall was recounted by Rabbi Chaim Elazar Spira of Munkatch (d. 1937) and involved Rabbi Chaim ibn Attar (d. 1743) who instructed a destitute man to place an amulet between the stones of the Wall.

The rationale behind placing prayer notes in the Wall has been traced to the Midrashic teaching, that the Divine Presence has never moved from the Western Wall, and the Kabbalistic teaching that all prayers ascend to Heaven through the Temple Mount, which the Western Wall abuts.

=== Modern-day practice ===
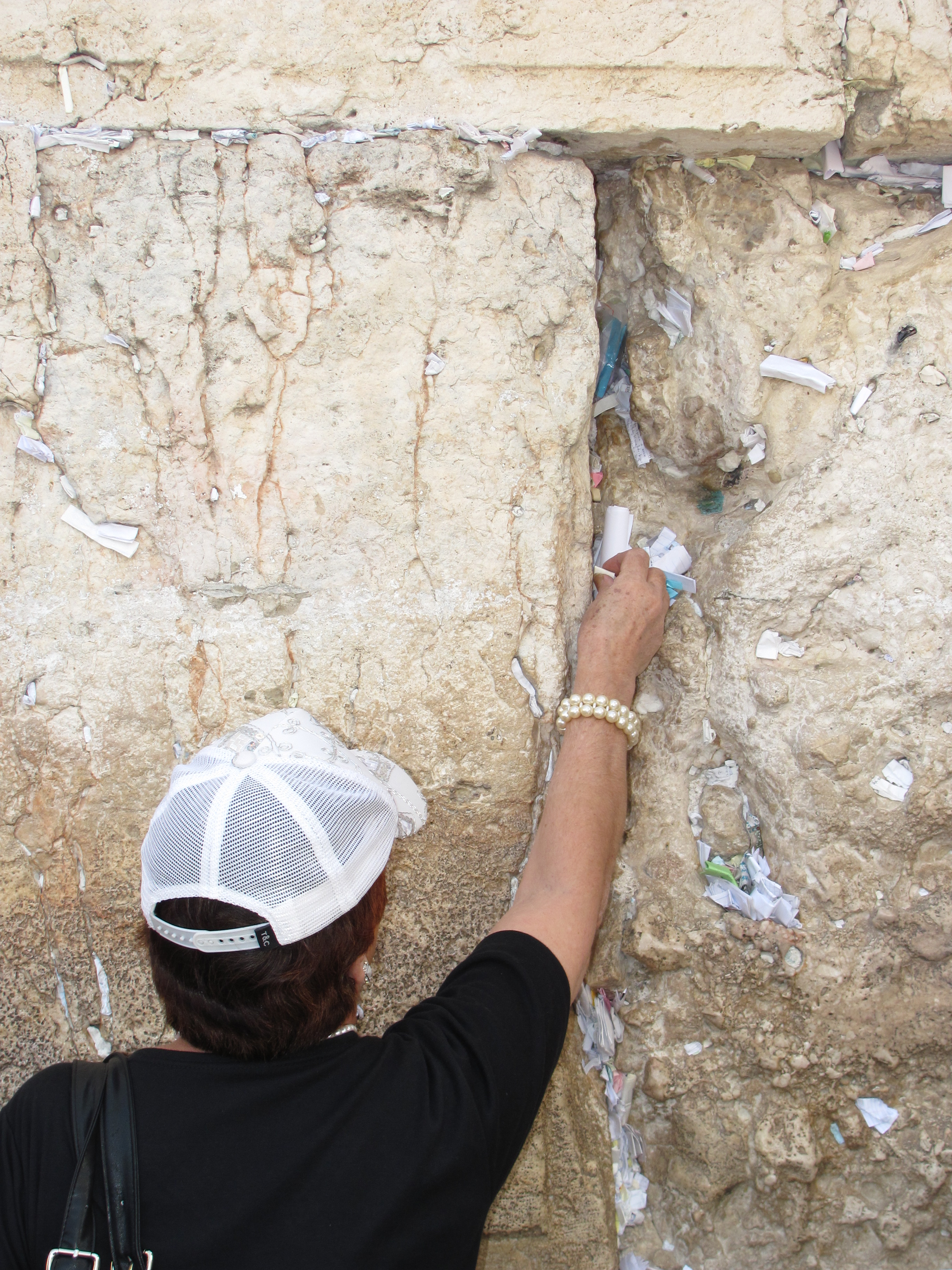
A woman places a prayer note in the Wall.

Today, more than a million prayer notes or wishes are placed in the Western Wall each year. Notes that are placed in the Wall are written in just about any language and format. Their lengths vary from a few words to very long requests. They include poems and Biblical verses. They are written on a wide variety of papers, including colored paper, notebook paper and even bubblegum wrappers, using a variety of inks.

Rabbi Shmuel Rabinovitch (or Rabinowitz), Rabbi of the Western Wall, receives hundreds of letters yearly addressed to "God, Jerusalem"; he folds these letters and places them, too, in the Wall.

Online services offer petitioners the opportunity to send their notes to the Western Wall via e-mail, fax, text messaging and Internet; the note is then printed out and inserted in the Wall. The Israeli Telephone Company has established such a fax service, as have a number of charitable websites.

== Disposal of notes ==
According to Jewish law, prayer notes may not be thrown away; there is a difference of opinion as to whether they should be burned or buried. According to Rabbi Shmuel Rabinowitz, Rabbi of the Western Wall and author of Minhagei HaKotel, a book of halakhot about the Western Wall, burning is a "pure" way to deal with the notes, but burying them is more honorable.

Rabinowitz states that the letters are buried because they have the status of letters to God. Twice a year, ahead of Rosh Hashanah and Passover, Rabinowitz and his assistants collect the notes left in the Wall and bury them in the Jewish cemetery on the Mount of Olives.

== Notable persons who have placed notes in the Wall ==
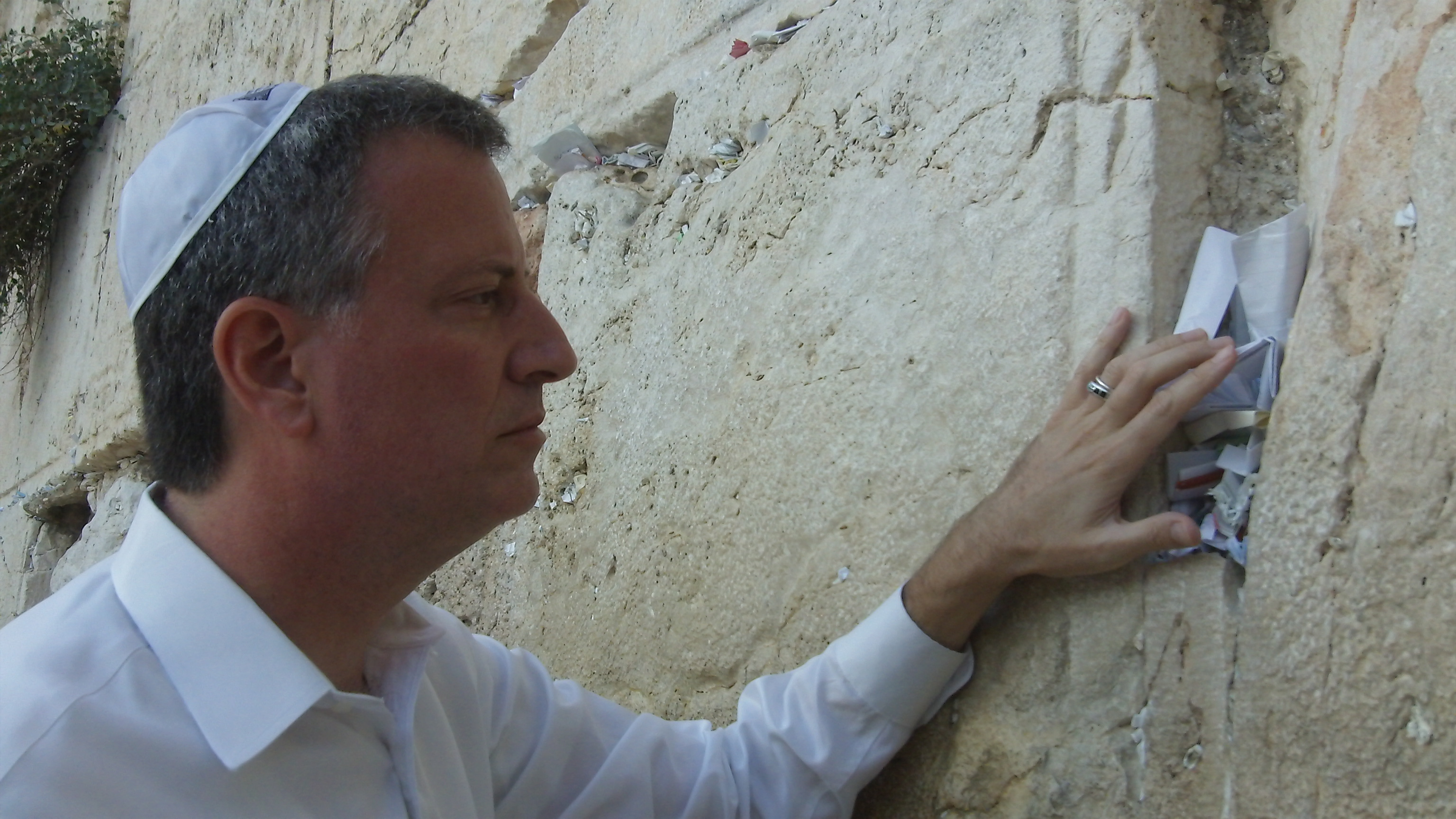
Then New York City Public Advocate, and former Mayor of New York Bill de Blasio places a prayer note in the Western Wall, 2011

The tradition of leaving notes for God in the Western Wall has been adopted by Christian pilgrims and people of other faiths. Foreign dignitaries who have publicly placed a message in the Western Wall include Pope John Paul II (in 2000), Pope Benedict XVI (in 2008) and Pope Benedict XVI, again in 2009, who released its contents to the media.

U.S. Senator Hillary Clinton deposited a note in 2005. In July 2008, U.S. presidential candidate Barack Obama placed a written prayer in the Wall. After Obama and his entourage departed, his note—written on hotel stationery—was removed from the Wall by a seminary student who sold it to the Maariv newspaper. The newspaper published the note, prompting criticism from other news sources and from the Rabbi of the Western Wall for violating the privacy that is inherent in notes placed in the Wall.

In July 2012, U.S. presidential candidate Mitt Romney placed a written prayer in the Wall. His note was later moved to a different location in the Wall for privacy reasons and to avoid a repeat of the incident with Obama's note in 2008.

On May 22, 2017, Donald Trump became the first sitting U.S. President to visit the Wall; he also inserted a note. Trump's Vice President, Mike Pence, visited the Wall and deposited a prayer note on January 23, 2018, at the conclusion of his four-day visit to Israel.

== See also ==
- Kvitel – Prayer note in Judaism
