= Western Wall Tunnel =

Tunnel in Jerusalem

- מנהרת הכותל (Hebrew)
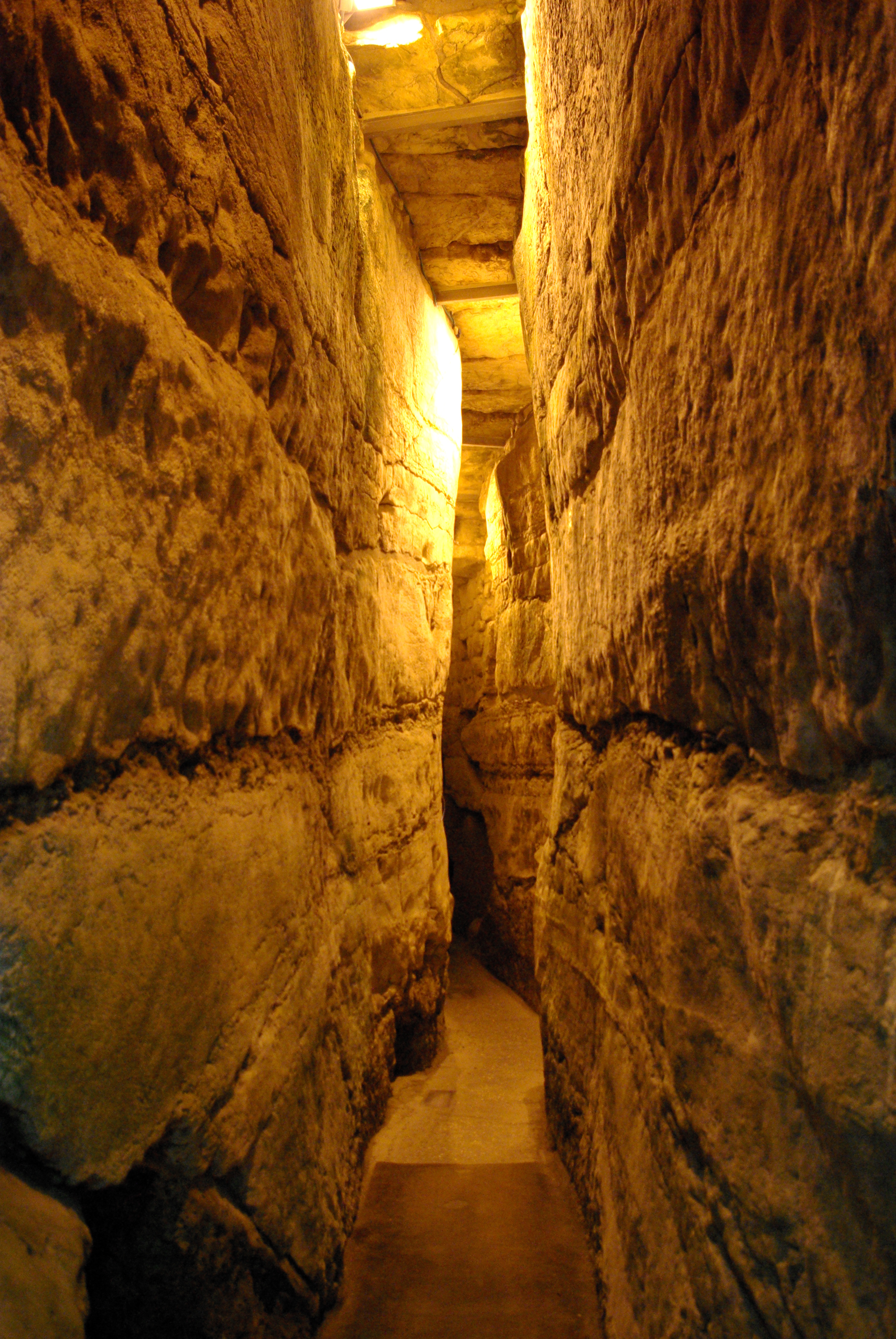
- Hasmonean Channel at the northern end of the Western Wall tunnel

- Location within Old City of Jerusalem
- 31.7770°N 35.2345°E
- Type: Tunnel
- Location: Old City of Jerusalem

Site notes
- Length: 488 m (1,601 ft)
- Public access: Yes

Walking through the Western Wall tunnels

The Western Wall Tunnel (Hebrew: מנהרת הכותל, romanized: Minharat Hakotel) is a tunnel exposing the Western Wall slightly north from where the traditional, open-air prayer site ends and up to the Wall's northern end. Most of the tunnel is in continuation of the open-air Western Wall and is located under buildings of the Muslim Quarter of the Old City of Jerusalem. While the open-air portion of the Western Wall is approximately 60 metres (200 ft) long, the majority of its original length of 488 metres (1,601 ft) is hidden underground. The tunnel allows access to the remainder of the Wall in a northerly direction.

The tunnel is connected to several adjacent excavated underground spaces, many of which can be visited together with the main tunnel. For this reason the plural form, Western Wall Tunnels, is often used.

== History ==
In 19 BCE, King Herod undertook a project to double the area of the Temple Mount in Jerusalem by incorporating part of the hill on the Northwest. In order to do so, four retaining walls were constructed, and the Temple Mount was expanded on top of them. These retaining walls remained standing, along with the platform itself, after the Temple was destroyed by the Romans in 70 CE.

Since then much of the area next to the walls became covered and built upon. Part of the Western Wall remained exposed after the destruction of the Temple. Since it was the closest area to the Temple’s Holy of Holies that remained accessible, it became a place of Jewish prayer for millennia.

== Excavation ==
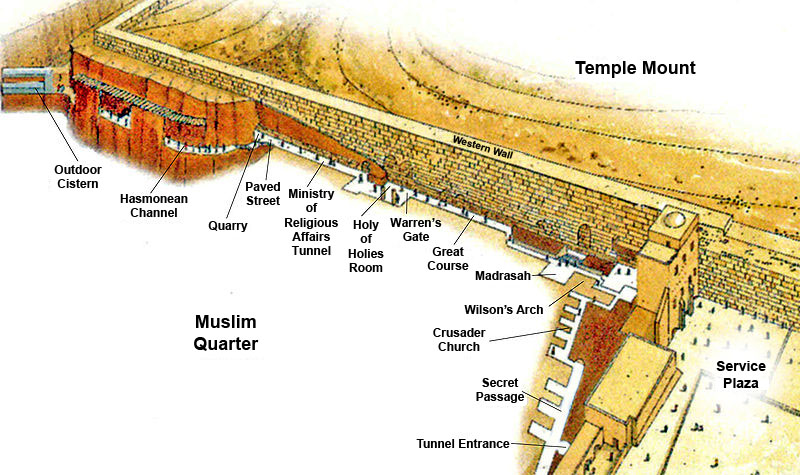
Route of the Western Wall Tunnel

British researchers started excavating the Western Wall in the mid 19th century. Charles Wilson began the excavations in 1864 and was followed by Charles Warren in 1867–70. Wilson discovered an arch now named for him, "Wilson's Arch" which was 12.8 metres (42 ft) wide and is above present-day ground level. This arch supported a bridge which connected the Temple Mount to the city during the Second Temple Period. Warren dug shafts under Wilson’s Arch which are still visible today.

After the Six-Day War, the Ministry of Religious Affairs of Israel began the excavations aimed at exposing the continuation of the Western Wall. The excavations lasted almost twenty years and revealed many previously unknown facts about the history and geography of the Temple Mount. The excavations were difficult to conduct, as the tunnels ran below residential neighborhoods constructed on top of ancient structures from the Second Temple Period. The earliest excavations were conducted with no scientific supervision, which soon changed when supervision was entrusted to scientific and rabbinic experts. This was to ensure both the stability of the structures above and to prevent damaging the historic artifacts. In 1988 The Western Wall Heritage Foundation was formed, it took over the excavation, maintenance and renovations of the Western Wall and Western Wall Plaza.

== Features ==
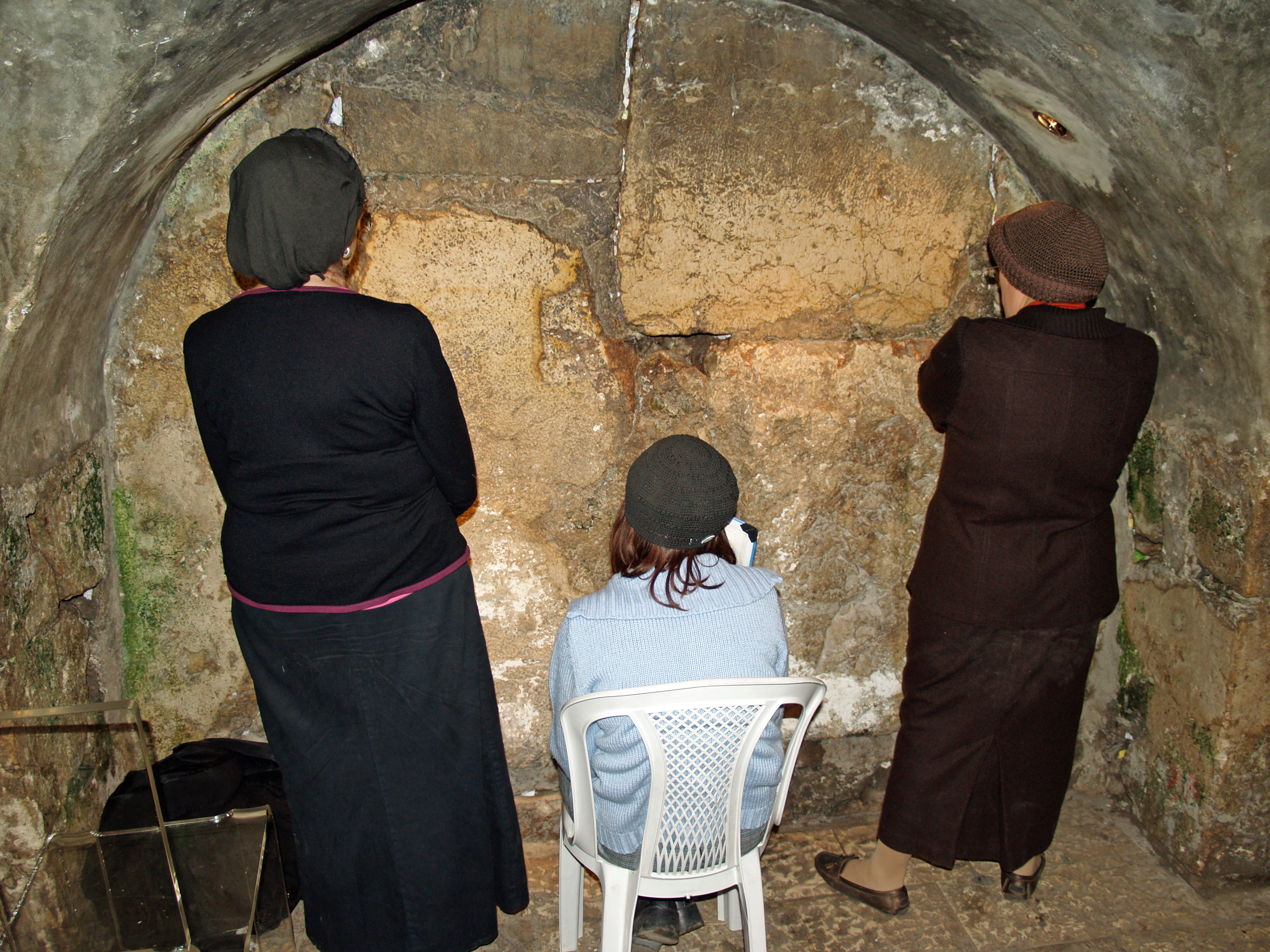
Women praying in the tunnel at the closest physical point to the Holy of Holies

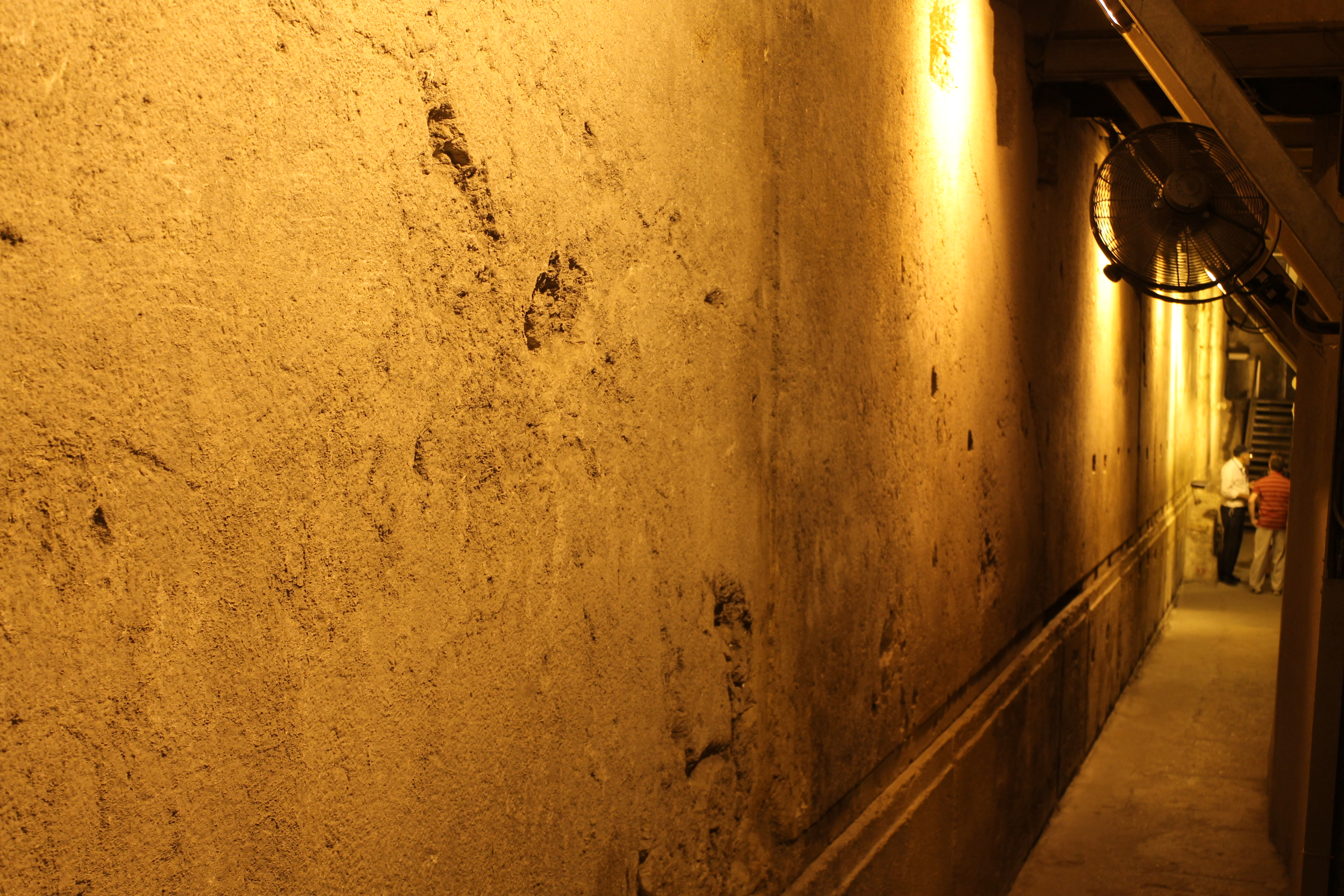
The Western Stone, biggest stone of the wall

=== Western Wall section ===
The tunnel exposes 300 m of the wall's total 445 m, revealing the construction methods and the various activities in the vicinity of the Temple Mount. The excavations included many archaeological finds along the way, including discoveries from the Herodian period (streets, monumental masonry), sections of a reconstruction of the Western Wall dating to the Umayyad period, and various structures dating to the Ayyubid, Mamluke and Hasmonean periods constructed to support buildings in the vicinity of the Temple Mount.

=== Warren's Gate ===
"Warren's Gate" lies about 150 feet (46 m) into the tunnel. This sealed-off entrance was for hundreds of years a small synagogue called "The Cave", where the early Muslims allowed the Jews to pray in close proximity to the ruins of the Temple. Rabbi Yehuda Getz built a synagogue just outside the gate, since today it is the closest point a Jew can pray near to the Holy of Holies, assuming it was located at the traditional site under the Dome of the Rock.

=== Hasmonean Channel ===
Beyond the northern end of the Western Wall, remains were found of a water channel that originally supplied water to the Temple Mount. The exact source of the channel is unknown, though it passes through an underground pool known as the "Struthion Pool". The water channel was dated to the Hasmonean period and was accordingly dubbed the "Hasmonean Channel".

=== Western Stone ===
The biggest stone in the Western Wall, often called the Western Stone, is also revealed within the tunnel, and ranks as one of the heaviest objects ever lifted by human beings without powered machinery. The stone has a length of 13.6 metres (45 ft) and height of 3 metres (9.8 ft). The width is hidden inside the Wall and was originally estimated between 3.5 metres (11 ft) and 4.5 metres (15 ft); with its weight at 570 short tons (520 metric tons). A survey using ground-penetrating radar suggests it is not as wide, and therefore weighs about 250-300 tonnes. The Western Wall Heritage Foundation (WWHF) website indicates, as of March 2020, an estimated weight of "several hundred tons". The Western Stone is similar to the even larger stones in the Temple of Jupiter at Baalbek in Lebanon.

=== Chain of Generations Center ===
Adjacent to the tunnel are the remains of Second Temple period, Crusader, and Mamluk structures. In the restored rooms, the Western Wall Foundation has created the Chain of Generations Center, a Jewish history museum designed by Eliav Nahlieli that includes an audiovisual show and nine glass sculptures created by glass artist Jeremy Langford.

=== Roman street to the Temple Mount ===
In 2007, the Israel Antiquities Authority uncovered an ancient Roman street thought to be from the second to fourth centuries. It was a side street which likely connected two major roads, and led up to the Temple Mount. The discovery of the road gave further evidence that Romans continued to use the Temple Mount after the destruction of the temple in 70 CE. Excavations at the site continued as late as 2014, led by archaeologists Peter Gendelman and Ortal Chalaf on behalf of the Israel Antiquities Authority (IAA).

== Struthion Pool ==
The Struthion Pool (sometimes described as the "Struthion Pools", in the plural), is a large cuboid cistern, which gathered the rainwater from guttering on the Forum buildings. Prior to Hadrian, this cistern had been an open-air pool, but Hadrian added arch vaulting to enable the pavement to be placed over it. The existence of the pool in the first century is attested by Josephus, who reports that it was called "Struthius" (sparrow). This Struthion Pool was originally built as part of an open-air water conduit by the Hasmoneans, which has since been enclosed; the source of the water for this conduit is currently unidentified.

As a result of 1971 extensions to the original Western Wall Tunnel, the Hasmonean water system, which runs under Arab housing, became linked to the end of the Western Wall Tunnel, and later opened as a tourist attraction. The course takes a linear route starting at the Western Wall Plaza and passes through the modern tunnels and the ancient water system, ending at the Struthion Pool. The Sisters of Zion do not allow tourists to exit into the convent at the Struthion Pool, so tourists return through the narrow tunnels to the starting point, although this does create some logistical problems.

== Northern exit ==
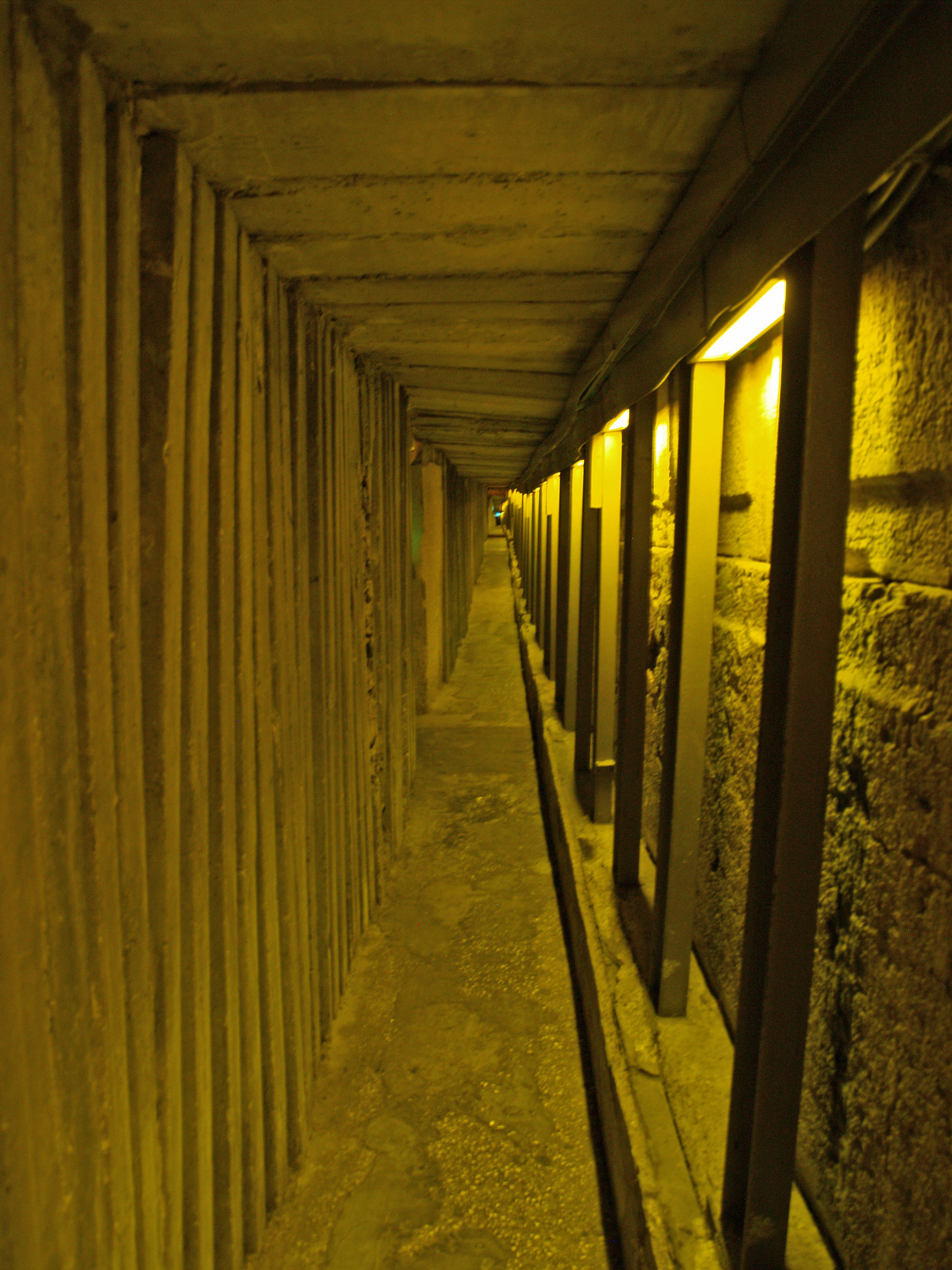
Concrete supports used to reinforce the ancient streets above in Jerusalem's Muslim Quarter. At the end of this tunnel is the northern exit

Originally, visitors had to retrace their steps back to the entrance. A connection to the Hasmonean water system was made, but this still required them to make a U-turn once they had reached the Struthion Pool. Digging an alternative exit from the tunnel was proposed, but initially rejected on the grounds that any exit would be seen as an attempt by the Jewish authorities to stake a claim to ownership of the nearby land—part of the Muslim Quarter of the city. In 1996, however, Benjamin Netanyahu authorized the creation of an exit leading to the Via Dolorosa, underneath the Ummariya madrasah. Over the subsequent few weeks, 80 people were killed as a result of riots against the creation of the exit. A modern wall divides the Struthion pool into two parts, preventing access between them. One side is visible from the western wall tunnels, and the other area is accessible from the Convent of the Sisters of Zion. Since then, it has been possible for large numbers of tourists to enter the tunnel's southern entrance near the Western Wall, walk the tunnel's length with a tour guide, and exit from the northern end. This exit is only open during daytime, owing to continued security concerns.

== See also ==
- Excavations at the Temple Mount
- Archaeology of Israel
- Tourism in Israel
