= Wailing Wall (band) =

Wailing Wall was a 1970s psychedelic rock band from El Paso, Texas. Their sole 1970 album has been described as "an item for the psychedelic rock collector's wish list" and as being reminiscent of the works of Neil Young, Captain Beefheart, Circuit Rider, and Savage Sons of Ya Ho Wa.

The original LP was released on Suemi Records of El Paso, TX. It was reissued on CD in 2004 by Shadoks Music.

== Personnel ==
- Mike Cancellare (guitar)
- Doug Adams (vocals)
- Darrel Adams (bass guitar)
- David Rutledge (drums)

== Discography ==
- 1970: Wailing Wall
