= The Western Wall Heritage Foundation =

Israeli organization

- הקרן למורשת הכותל המערבי
- Established: October 1988; 38 years ago
- Founder: Ministry of Religious Services
- Type: Foundation
- Registration no.: 580137594
- Legal status: Foundation
- Purpose: Western Wall
- Headquarters: Jewish Quarter (Jerusalem)
- Coordinates: 31°46′34.2″N 35°13′56.6″E
- Services: Management of the Western Wall Tunnels, educational projects, cleaning
- Chairman: Shmuel Rabinovitch
- Parent organization: Prime Minister's Office
- Budget: ₪ 62,645,000 (2020)
- Staff: 662 (2020)
- Website: thekotel.org/en/

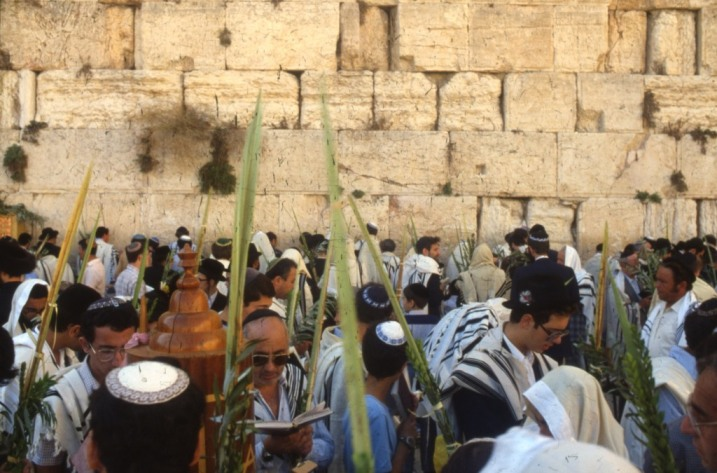
The Western Wall

The Western Wall Heritage Foundation, often mentioned as the Western Wall Foundation, is the body responsible for administration for all matters concerning the Western Wall in Jerusalem. The group is made up of mostly ultra-Orthodox (Haredi) Jews and operates under the auspices of the office of the Prime Minister of Israel and the Government Companies Authority. Rabbi Ilan Cohen previously served as the Foundation's Chairman, and the position is currently held by Rabbi Shmuel Rabinovitch.

The Western Wall Heritage Foundation was established in October 1988, for the purpose of general maintenance, development, supervision, excavation in the Western Wall Tunnels, maintaining the infrastructure of the Wall, exhibitions, and publicity. At a Cabinet meeting (19 December 2004), it was decided that the responsibilities of the Foundation would be extended to include all activities in the Western Wall Plaza and surrounding areas – building, maintenance (cleaning), development and educational projects. The latter activities include bringing specialized groups such as teenagers or soldiers for guided tours in the Old City and the Western Wall area.

== Projects ==
=== Western Wall Tunnels ===
Of the entire 488 meters (the full length of the Western Wall), only 57 meters are exposed to view. Throughout the years, most of the wall was covered over by the houses of the Muslim Quarter of the Old City. The Western Wall Tunnels consists of underground spaces and tunnels dating from different time periods which stretch along the entire length of the Wall beneath the Muslim Quarter. In the area, structures from the Second Temple period and the Middle Ages exist side by side with modern buildings. A pedestrian path connects the underground spaces and tunnels which give the visitor the experience of traveling through different periods of time, and is considered one of the most popular tourist attractions in Israel. The site has sometimes been a source of friction due to the religious sensitivities of the Muslim and Jewish communities, and more than once has erupted to a boiling point. The most contentious event occurred in 1967. After the Six-Day War, the Ministry of Religious Affairs initiated a project which allowed Jews unhindered and uninterrupted access to the Western Wall. Today the project is authorized, developed and maintained by the Western Wall Heritage Foundation.

=== Generations Center ===
The Generation Center, formally the Chain of Generations Center, is a museum located near the Western Wall. The center utilizes some of the underground spaces to highlight the connections between the generations. In one of the rooms there are archaeological remains from the First and Second Temples. Visitors walk through different parts of the 'chain', represented through a range of media, including glass etchings, highlighting, etc., and using audio technology.

=== Western Wall Heritage Center ===
Located in the Core House (Hebrew: בית הליבה, romanized: Beit Haliba), directly across the plaza from the Western Wall, the heritage center was dedicated 16 November 2021. The center serves as both a headquarters for the foundation and as an educational center for visitors. Constructed atop an excavated area, a number of ruins, including a Roman-period road, are visible on the building's lowest level.

=== Mughrabi Gate ===
The Mughrabi Gate, less often called the Rambam Gate, is an entrance to the Temple Mount platform, located on the southern side of the Western Wall. Today this is the only gate by which non-Muslim tourists can access the Temple Mount platform. The gate was named after the Moroccan Quarter that was destroyed after the Six-Day War as part of a project to create the Western Wall Plaza. The Foundation was responsible for restoring the former ramp, now provisional bridge, leading to the Temple Mount.

=== Ohel Yitzchak Synagogue ===
The Ohel Yitzchak Synagogue is a synagogue situated at the southern border of the Muslim Quarter of the Old City. It was built in 1904 at a distance of fewer than 20 meters from an alley leading to the Western Wall. It was abandoned in the 1936–39 Arab revolt in Palestine and was destroyed by the Jordanians in the 1947–1949 Palestine war. The synagogue was reconstructed in 2008 and a year later was connected by a tunnel to the Western Wall tunnels, thus allowing direct access to the Western Wall Plaza. The synagogue was reconstructed and renovated and is administered and maintained by the Foundation.

=== Hall of Ages ===
A 14th-century Mamluk khan with adjacent hammam underneath the Ohel Yitzchak Synagogue in the Muslim Quarter was excavated and made into a Jewish educational centre, the "Hall of Ages".

== Services ==
=== Priestly blessing at the Western Wall ===
The priestly blessing is a particularly significant custom is the communal blessing at the Western Wall, introduced in 1970 by Rabbi Mendel Geffner. It is held twice a year, during the intermediate days of Sukkot and Passover under the auspices of the Foundation.

=== Bar Mitzvah Project ===
The Foundation provides a range of services for families wishing to hold bar mitzvah ceremonies at the Western Wall. These services include information and support, and assisting families. The service is provided free of charge by the Foundation and includes providing a guide who assists the family with all technical aspects connected with the event as well as with information concerning the content.

== Challenges by Women of the Wall ==
The practices of the Western Wall Heritage Foundation have been challenged by the Women of the Wall (Hebrew: נשות הכותל, Neshot HaKotel), a multi-denominational feminist organization based in Israel whose goal is to secure the rights of women to pray at the Western Wall in a fashion that includes singing, reading aloud from the Torah and wearing religious garments (tallit, tefillin and kippah). The Pew Forum has identified Israel as one of the countries that places "high" restrictions on religion, and there have been limits placed on non-Orthodox streams of Judaism. One of those restrictions is that the Rabbi of the Western Wall has enforced gender segregation and limitations on religious garb worn by women. When the "Women of the Wall" hold monthly prayer services for women on Rosh Hodesh, they observe gender segregation so that Orthodox members may fully participate. But their use of religious garb, singing and reading from a Torah have upset some members of the Orthodox Jewish community, sparking protests and arrests. In May 2013 a judge ruled that a 2003 Israeli Supreme Court ruling prohibiting women from carrying a Torah or wearing prayer shawls had been misinterpreted and that Women of the Wall prayer gatherings at the wall should not be deemed illegal.

== German abbot controversy ==
In 2023, the Foundation came under criticism after an employee told German Catholic clergyman Nikodemus Schnabel, a high-ranking Benedictine monk and abbot of the Abbey of the Dormition in Jerusalem, to hide his cross necklace while at the Western Wall, with an official saying the cross was "really big and inappropriate for this place. It's a Jewish place, you need to respect that" and that the prohibition was a new regulation, according to Christoph Schult of Der Spiegel. This came amid a rise in anti-Christian sentiment among Haredi Jews and religious Zionists in Jerusalem, including spitting at Christian clergymen and tourists, desecration of Christian burial grounds, as well as attacks on priests and vandalism of Christian religious sites. In response to criticism, the Foundation said there were no regulations, but that "the usher [...] politely asked if it would be possible to cover the cross to prevent any discomfort, as has recently occurred in the Old City, out of a desire to respect both the visitor and the site. When he refused, entry was obviously not denied, and the usher respected the decision and continued on her way".

== See also ==
- Excavations at the Temple Mount
