= Yehuda Getz =

- יהודה גץ
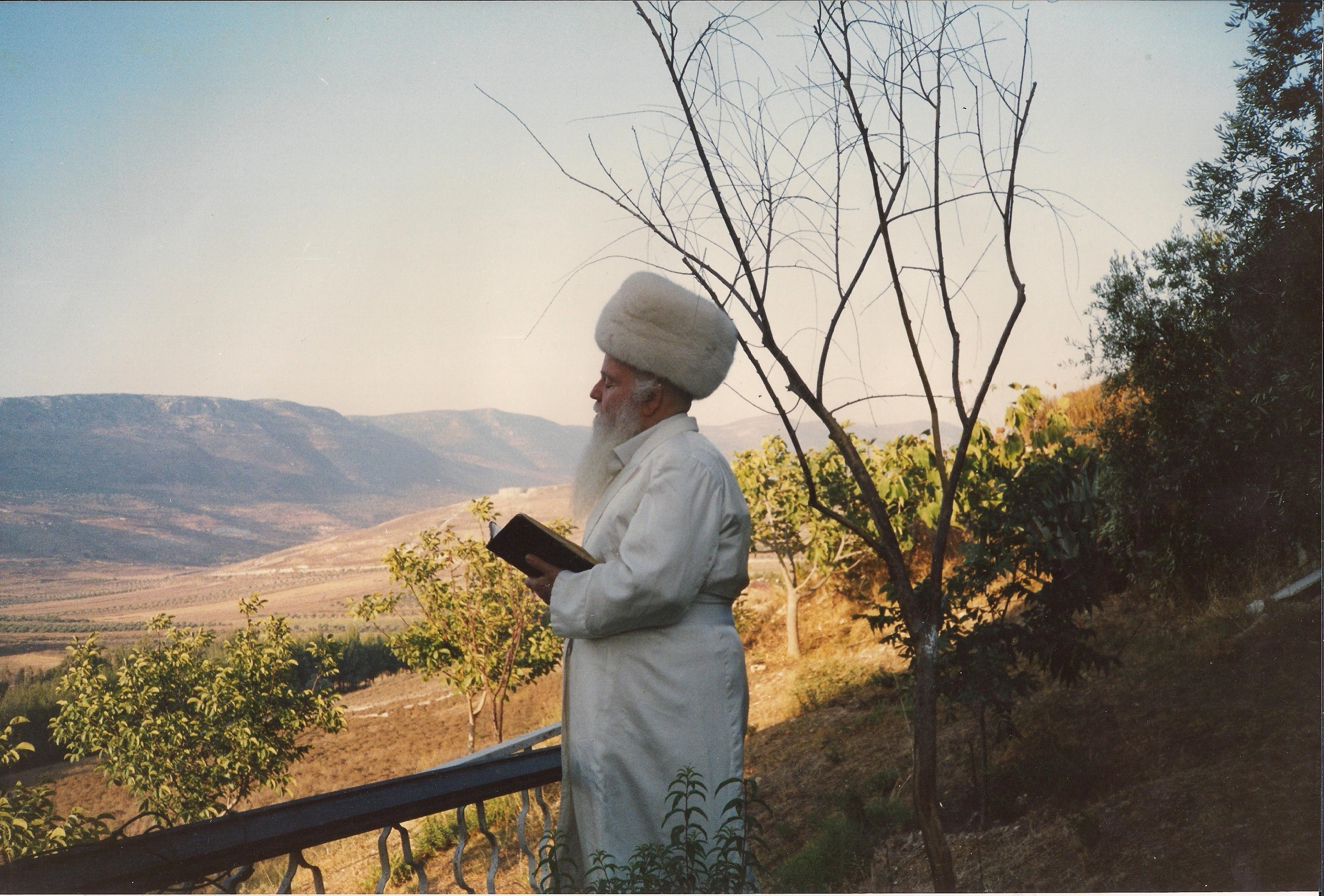
- Born: 1924; Tunis, French Tunisia
- Died: 17 September 1995 (aged 70–71); Jerusalem, Israel
- Title: Rabbi

Yehuda Getz (Hebrew: יהודה גץ; 1924 – 17 September 1995) was the rabbi of the Western Wall for 27 years.

== Biography ==
Yehuda Meir Getz was born in Tunis, Tunisia, in 1924. He emigrated to Israel in 1949, settling in Kerem Ben Zimra, a moshav in Upper Galilee. He joined the Israel Defense Forces, rising to the rank of lieutenant colonel.

Getz died in Jerusalem of a heart attack on 17 September 1995. He was survived by his wife and six children and is buried on the Mount of Olives.

== Rabbinic career ==
After the death of his son Avner in the Six-Day War, he moved to Jerusalem's Old City. Shortly afterwards he was appointed as overseer of prayers at the Western Wall.

He served as the head of the Beit El Kabbalist yeshiva from 1973 to 1995.

Getz was a supporter of Excavations at the Temple Mount. In July 1981, Getz and a team of associates opened a tunnel under the Temple Mount near where he believed the Ark of the Covenant had been hidden in Solomon's Temple, directly below the Holy of Holies of the Second Temple.
