= Chain Gate street =

Street in the old city of Jerusalem

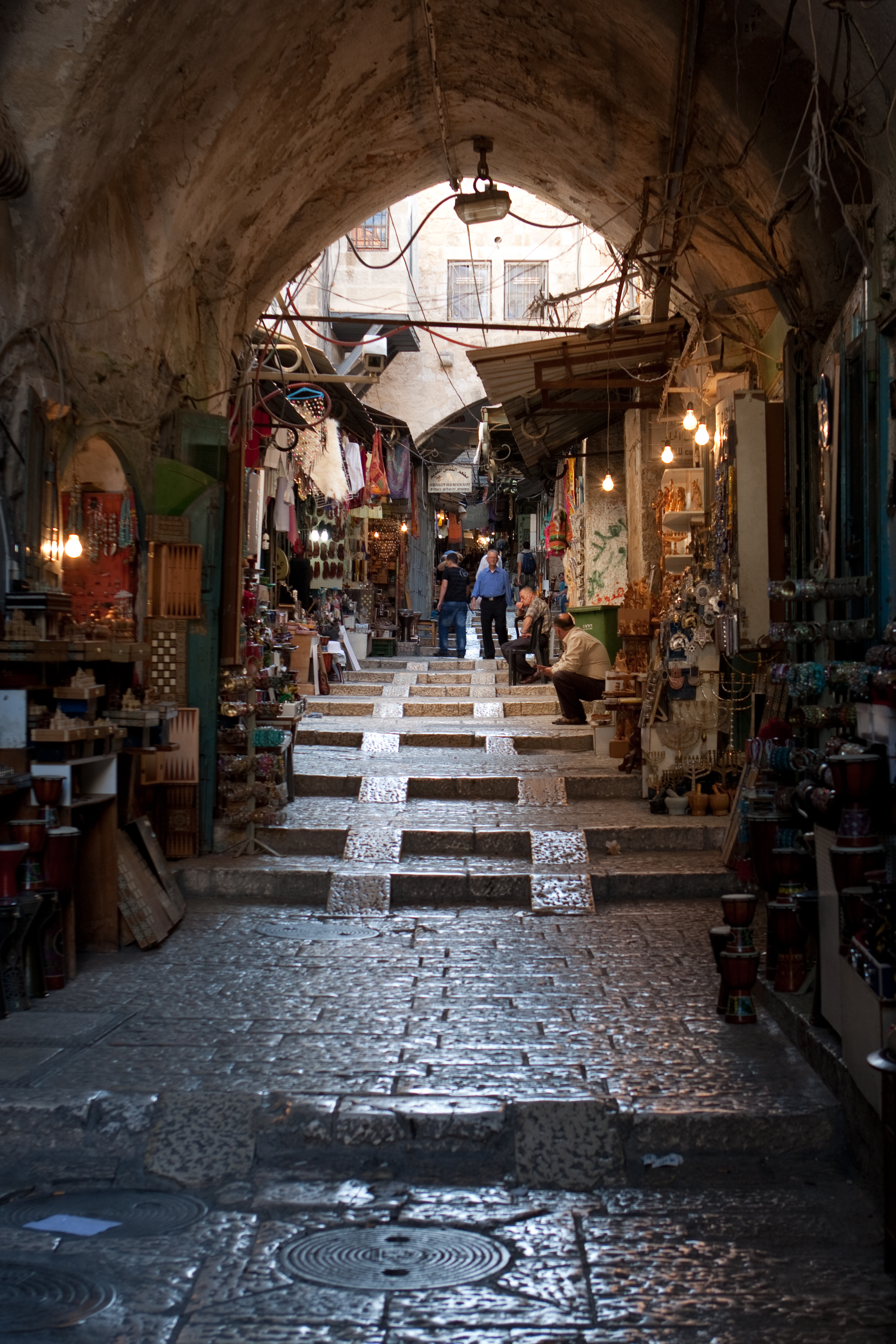
- The street in 2011
- Interactive map of Chain Gate street
- Native name: طريق السلسلة (Arabic)
- Namesake: Chain Gate, Al-Aqsa
- Maintained by: Jerusalem waqf
- Length: 308 metres (1,010 ft)
- Location: Old City of Jerusalem
- From: Chain Gate
- To: David street, Butchers' market

Chain Gate street (Arabic: طريق باب السلسلة, romanized: Ṭarīq Bāb as-Silsila) is a major residential and commercial street in the Old City of Jerusalem, along it are a souk with 110 shops and buildings dating back to the Mamluk rule of Jerusalem. The road leads up to the Chain gate, after which the street is named, leading up to the gate are vaults of Umayyad architecture, the final 120 meters of the street to east are built on a bridge dated dated back to the Umayyad Caliphate.

== Archeology ==
Underneath the street are barrel vaulted structures that were discovered in 1845 by Titus Tobler who interpreted them to be an ancient bridge.

A structure of 6 groin vaulted bays was found on the street, which has been identified by some academics as the possible site of a medieval market.

Remains dating back to the Roman period are found underneath parts of the street.

== Sites ==
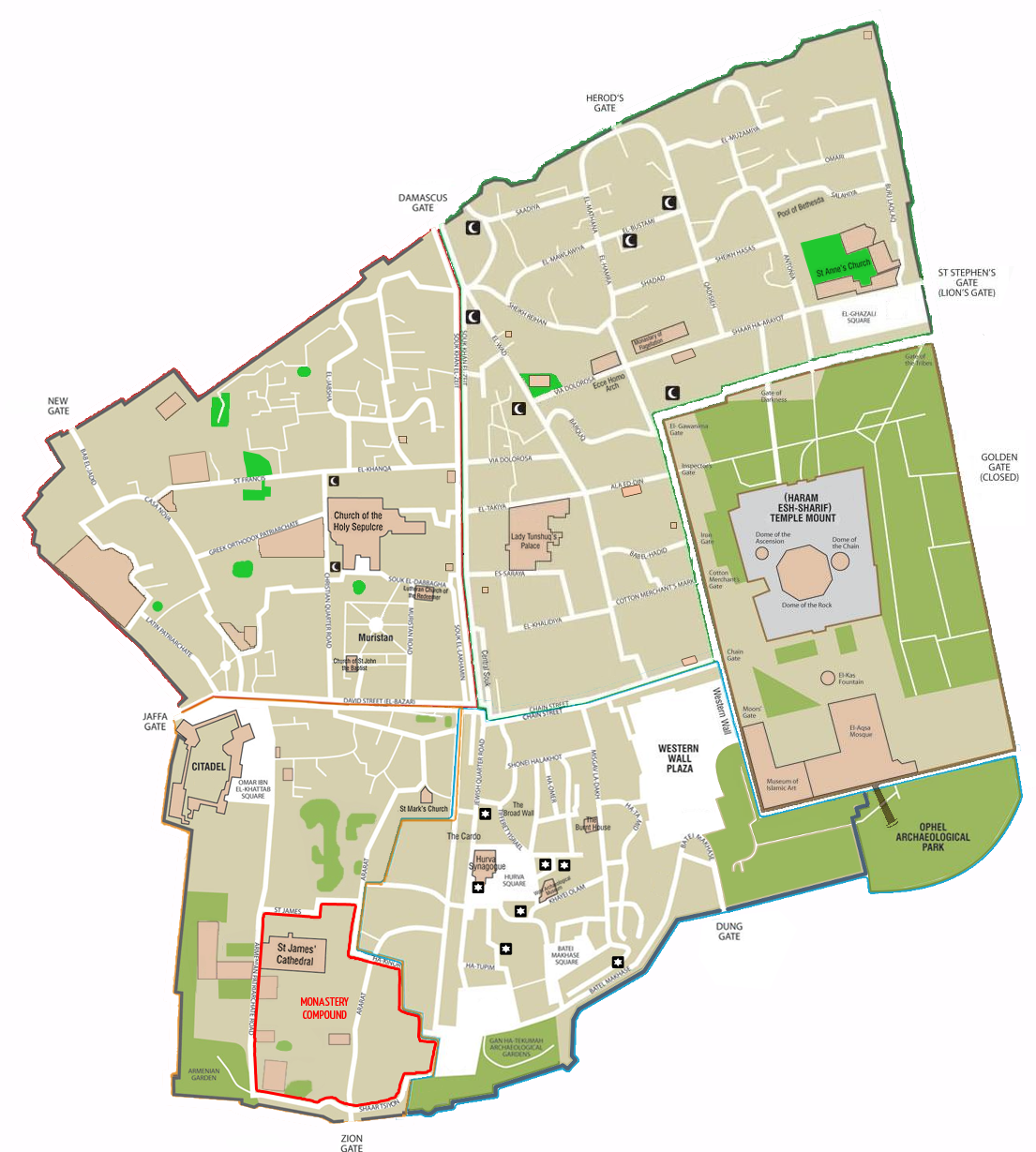
A map of modern-day Jerusalem, chain gate street can be seen extending from the west side of the al-Aqsa complex to the start of David street.

Among the sites found along the street are:

- Khan al-Sultan: Khan al-Sultan is a caravanserai on the western side of the street, it was renovated in 788 AH (1386/1387 CE) by the Mamluks, it has also operated as a market as early as the 15th century as attested by Mujir al-Din's writings.
- Tashtamuriyya school: Al-Tashtamuriyya (Arabic: الطشتمرية, romanized: Al-Ṭashtimuriyya) is a school established in 784 AH (1382/1383 CE) by a Mamluk prince. In the 21st century, it is used as a residential building and a headquarters for the Supreme Islamic Council (Jerusalem).
- The market: A souk known as suq al-silsila with a 110 shops is found along the street, it is named after the gate.
- The Khalidi Library: The Khalidi library is located on the street, near the eponymous Chain gate.
- Sabil Bab al-Silsila: Sabil Bab al-Silsila is a sabil found along the street that was constructed by Suleiman the Magnificent in 1537.

=== Women's Hospice ===
The women's hospice (Arabic: رباط النساء, romanized: Ribar al-Nisa') was established by Tankiz in 730 AH (1329/1330 CE) opposite the Tankiziyya near the gate. Intended to house poor and unmarried women of Jerusalem, the building was constructed around a modest corridor-centered plan with rooms opening off its northern and western sides. Its relatively simple exterior has a trefoil arched entrance portal facing the square. A cistern and well chamber within the complex were reportedly supplied through Tankiz' charitable endowment. The building is now used as residential housing. Some legends attribute the construction of the hospice to Terken Khatun.

=== Turbat Khatun ===
Turbat Turken Khatun (Arabic: تربة تركان خاتون) was built in 1352–53 on the north side of the road west of the sa'diyya, as the mausoleum of Turkan Khatun, daughter of the prince Tuqtay al-Saljuqi al-Uzbaki. The small Mamluk mausoleum consists of a domed burial chamber and an antechamber, and is noted for its finely decorated symmetrical facade with bichrome masonry, carved inscriptions, arabesque panels, and ornamentation surrounding the windows and central pilaster. The building inscription records the date of construction but does not mention the circumstances of Turkan Khatun's death.

== History ==
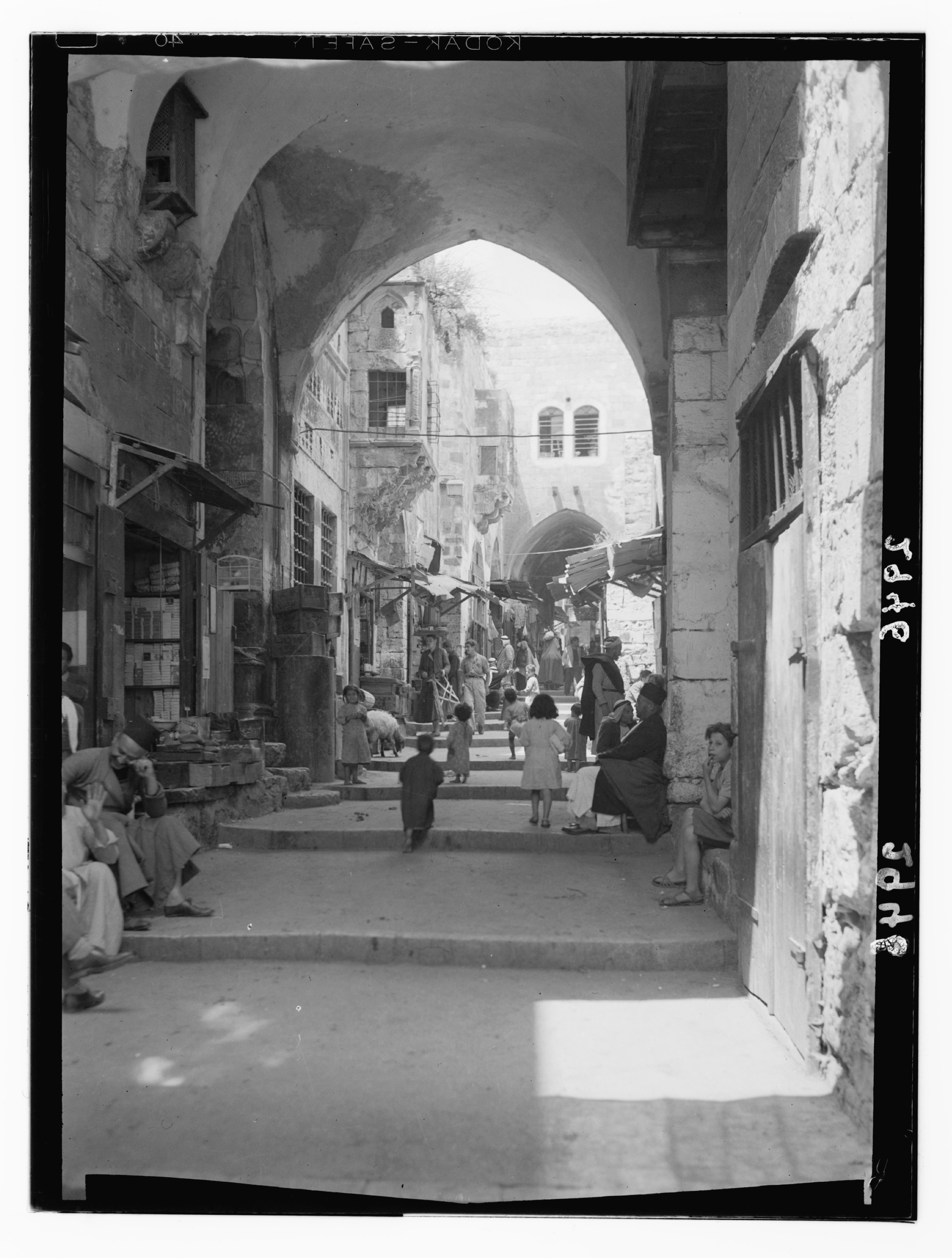
The street in 1920. Photographed by The Matson Photo Service.

The streets crosses the central valley of the city over a wide bridge that may date back to the Herod era, though the bridge underneath may have been renovated during Muslim rule.

15th century chronicler Mujir al-Din reported the chain gate streets market was one of the main markets of Jerusalem, and it was divided into sections based on the types of merchendise sold.

=== Mamluk period ===
During the reign of the Mamluk Sultan, the Sultanate administered large-scale architectural renovations to the city, many of these renovations were concentrated along the Chain gate street. 7 Mamluk monuments were constructed on the street, all of them containing burial sites, though it unknown why burials were common on this street, the construction of burial sites stopped after the Circassian Burji Mamluks took power.

=== Ottoman period ===
The Silsila neighborhood was one of the most densely populated sections of the old city during Ottoman rule, alongside Al-Wad Street. The 1905 Ottoman census, counted the population of Bab el-Silsila neighborhood and found 548 Muslim heads of families and 711 Jewish heads of families, despite its proximity to the Jewish quarter. Historian Vincent Lemire notes that this pattern of intermixed Muslim and Jewish family homes was common in Ottoman Jerusalem.

=== Post-1967 ===
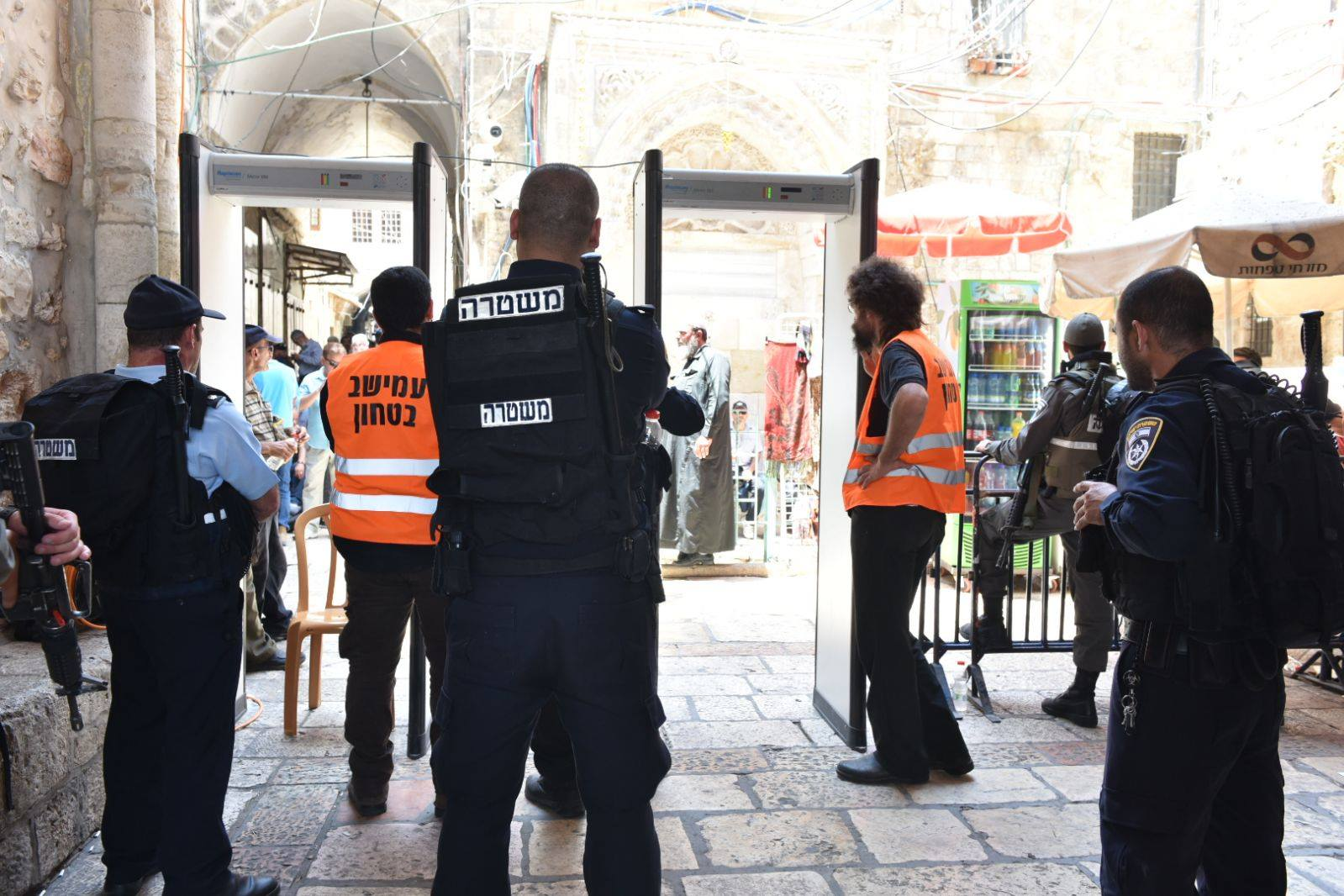
Israeli Police Metal Detectors. Image shared by the official Facebook account of the Israel police.

As reported by Al Jazeera English, the street has been routinely by Israelis since 2003 to exit Al-Aqsa after they enter from Bab al-Maghariba.

During the 2017 Temple Mount crisis, the Israeli Police installed metal detectors on a few of the gates to the al-Aqsa compound, the metal dectors were removed in the same month, following protests. One of the metal detectors was placed on chain street.

In May of 2026, the Israeli government began looking into seizing properties in the street belonging to Arab residents of the city. The move to seize the land was linked to a decision made April 14, 1968 when 116 dunams (116,000 m^{2}) of land were reallocated to the Jewish quarter. According to Israeli Channel 12, this could "lead to the confiscation of roughly 50 buildings" and the "eventual eviction of the Muslim families living there."

==== Attacks and violent incidents ====
- October 1971: A hand grenade was thrown at a group of pedestrians walking down the street toward the Western Wall, injuring 16 people, including three American tourists.
- March 1991: Avraham Rubacha, a 74-year-old Jewish resident of Jerusalem, was stabbed from behind on Chain Gate Street while walking toward the Western Wall.
- November 2021: A Hamas gunman opened fire on passersby, killing an Israeli civilian on his way to the Western Wall and wounding four others before being shot and killed by Border Police officers.
- May 2025: A stabbing attack occurred at the entrance to Chain Gate, in which a Palestinian attacker wounded a Border Police officer before being shot and killed by security forces.

== Gallery ==
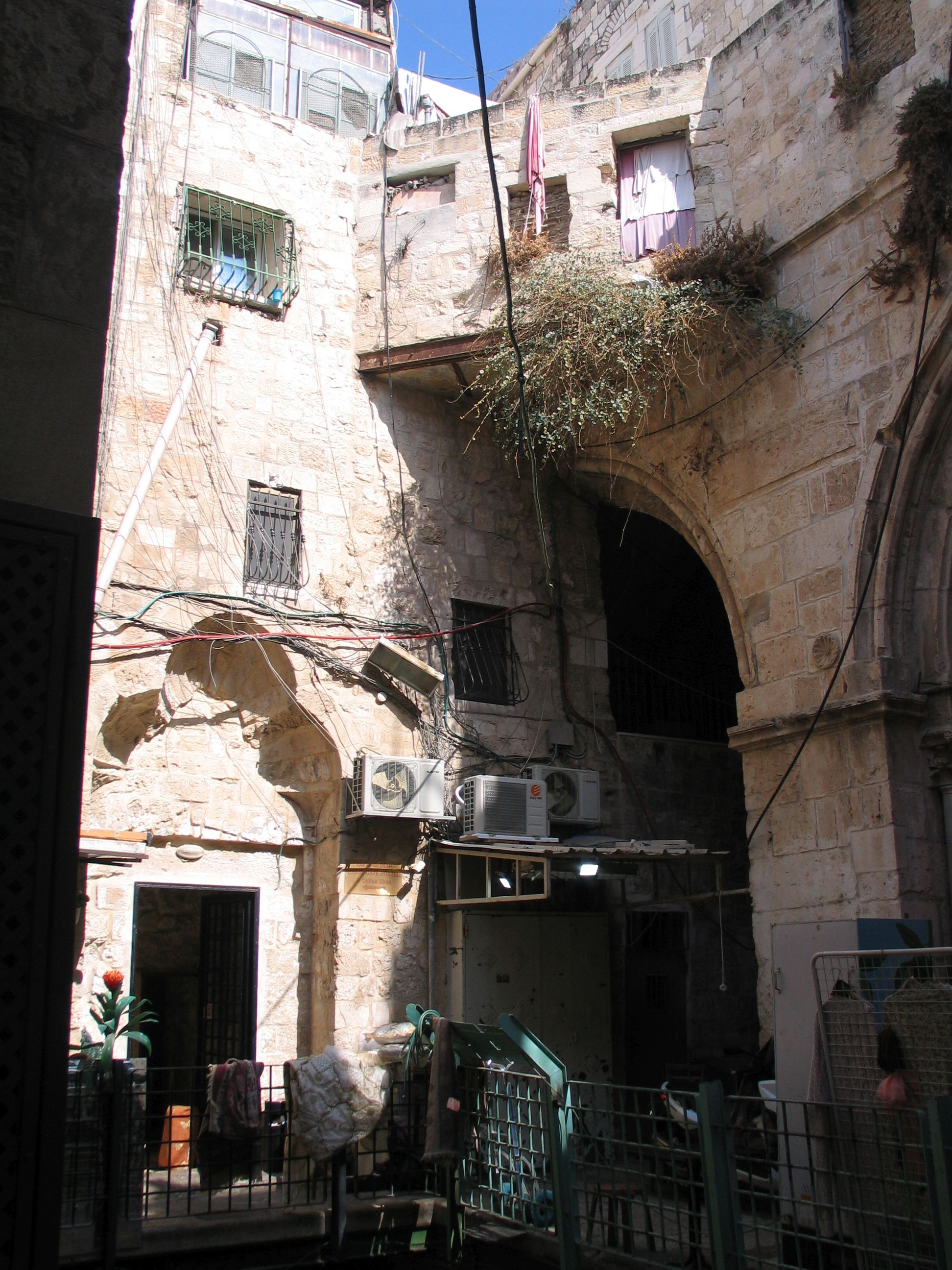
The women's hospice, 2017

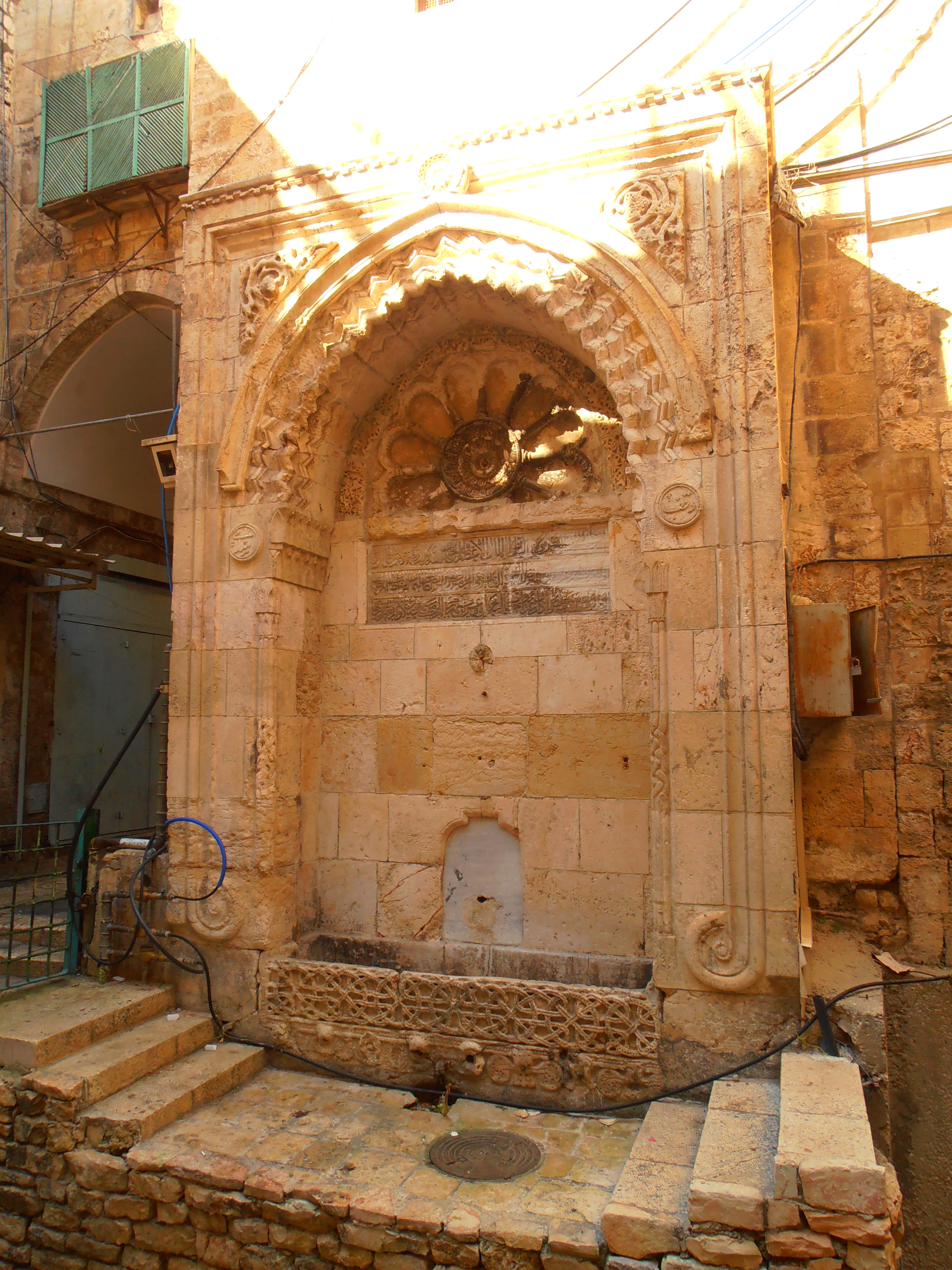
Sabil al-Silsila (the fountain), 2014

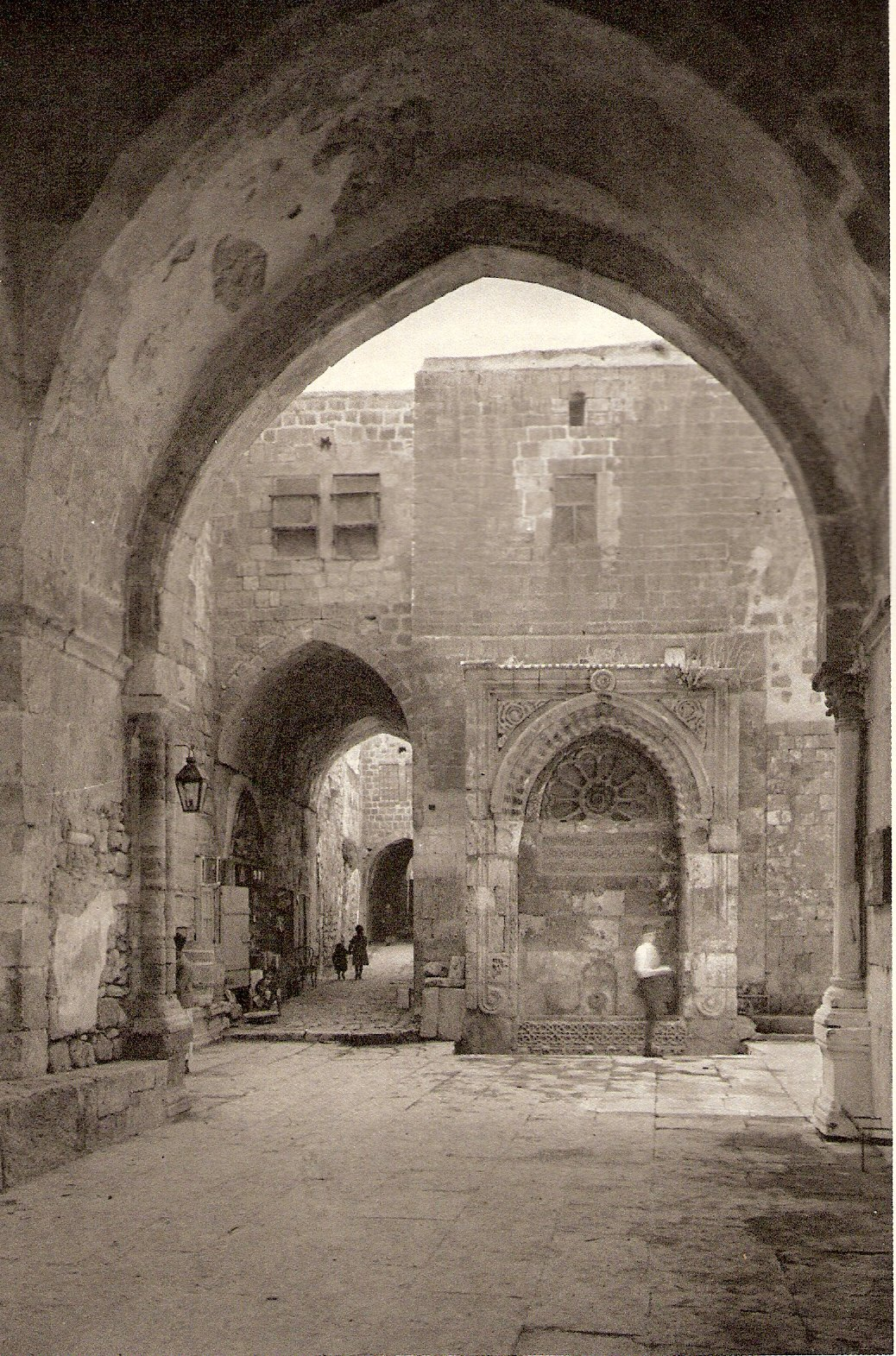
The street and fountain in 1925

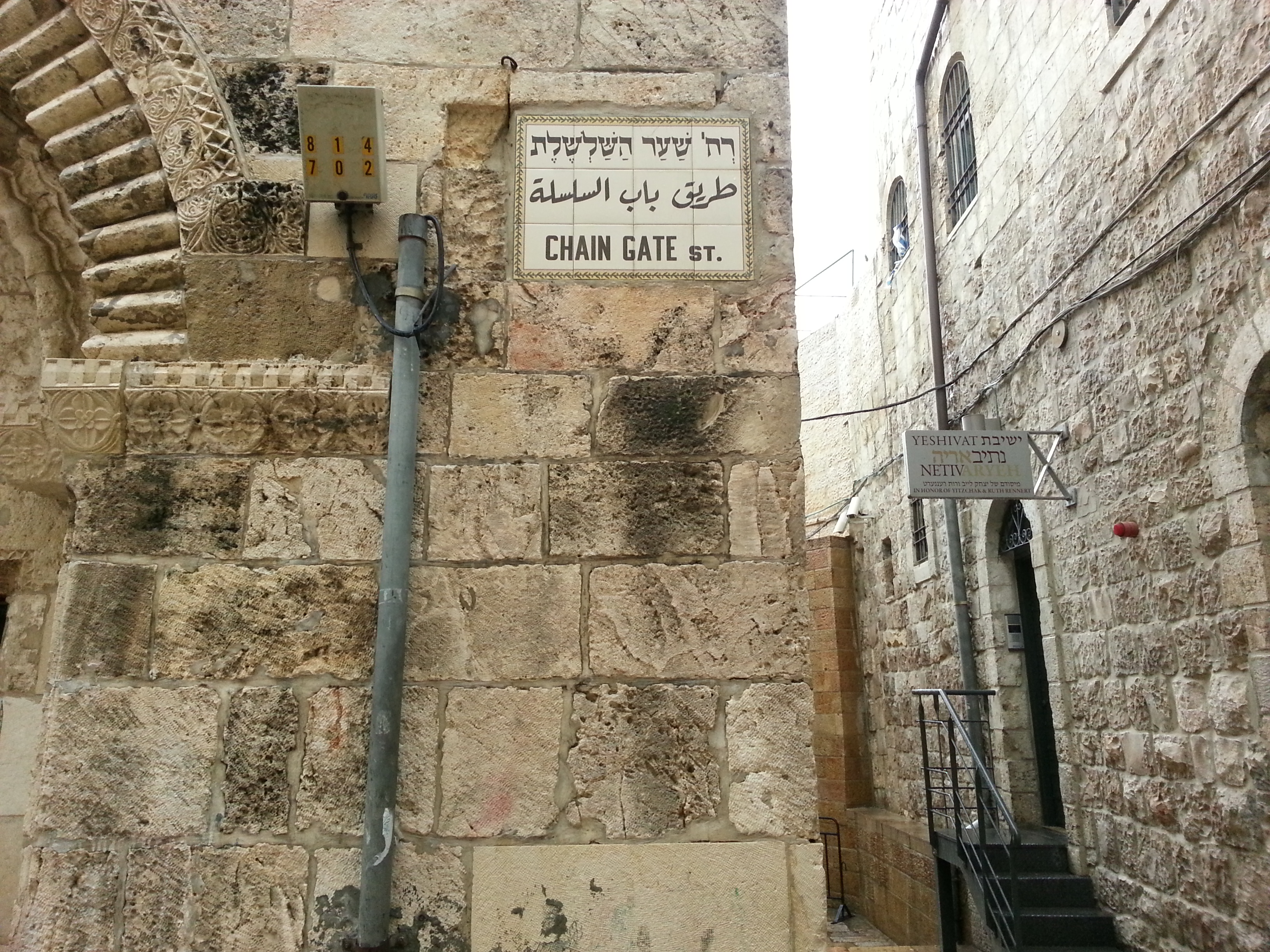
Trilingual road sign on the street

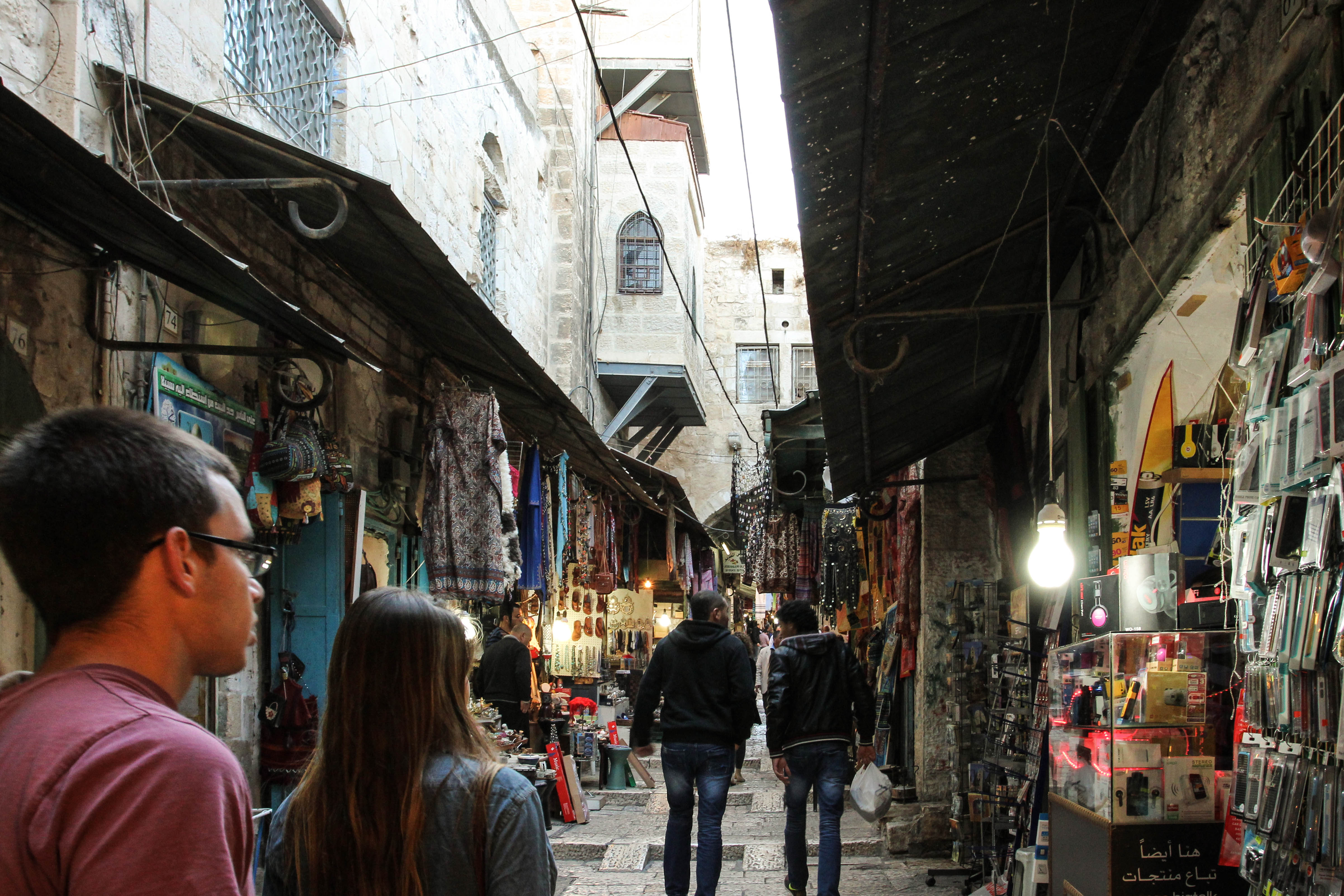
The market in 2013

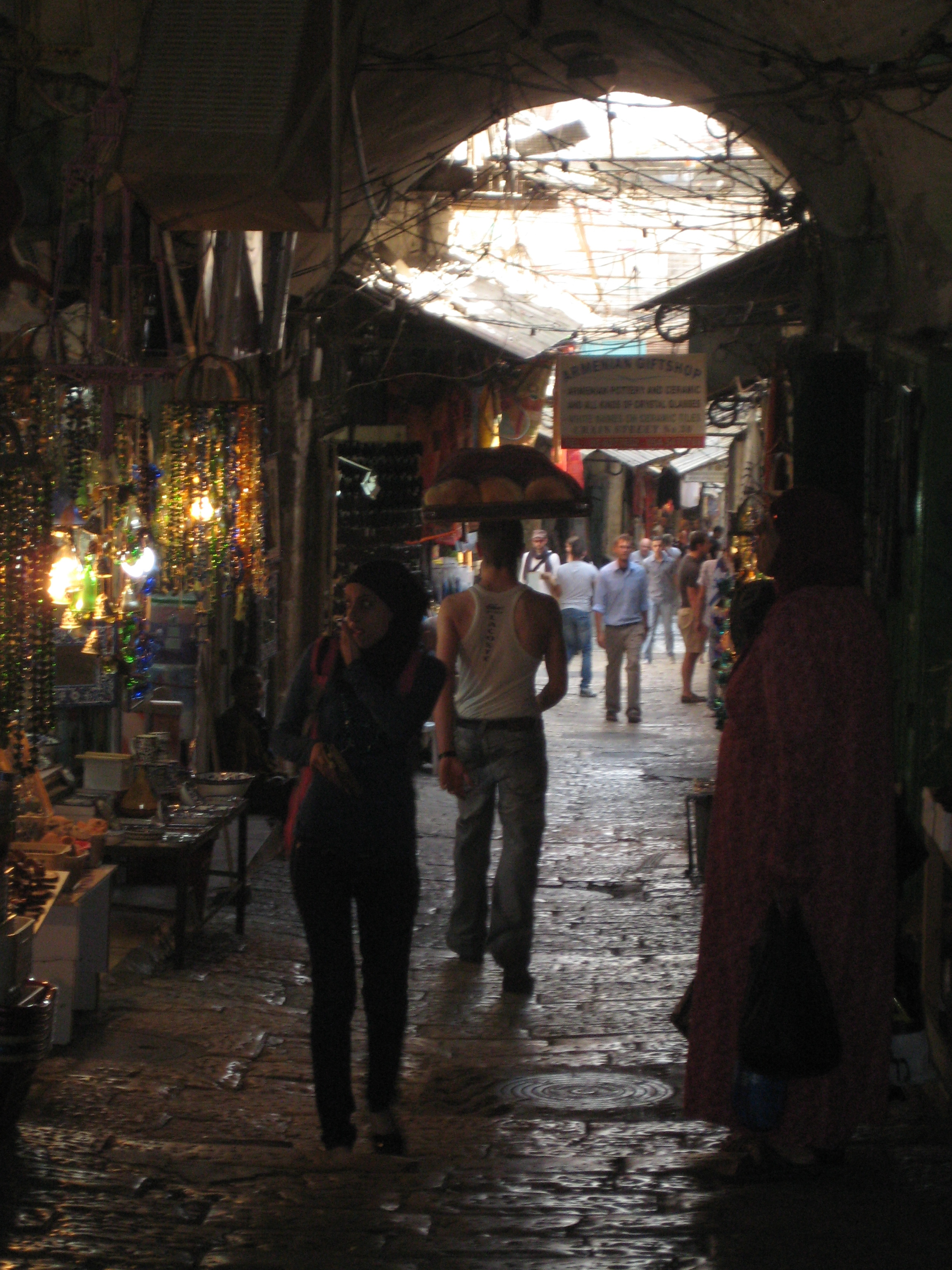
A roofed section of the market appearing dark during daytime.
