= Ohel Yitzchak Synagogue =

Orthodox synagogue in Jerusalem

- Interior of the synagogue

- Location of the synagogue in the Old City of Jerusalem

Religion
- Affiliation: Orthodox Judaism
- Ecclesiastical or organisational status: Yeshiva (1870s–1938); Synagogue (1904–1938); Profane use (1938–2008); Synagogue (since 2008)
- Status: Active

Location
- Location: ha-Gai Street (12 George Washington Street), Muslim Quarter, Old City of Jerusalem
- Coordinates: 31°46′37.95″N 35°14′3.82″E

Architecture
- Type: Synagogue architecture
- Established: 1892 (as a congregation)
- Completed: 1870s (as a yeshiva); 1904 (as a synagogue); 2008 (refurbishments)
- Destroyed: 1938 (since reconstructed)

The Ohel Yitzchak Synagogue, also known as the Shomrei ha-Chomos Synagogue and the Ungarin Shul (Hungarian synagogue), is an Orthodox Jewish congregation and synagogue, located in the Muslim Quarter of the Old City of Jerusalem. It was built as a yeshiva in the 1870s by Kolel Shomrei HaChomos, an organization of Hungarian Jews, but was abandoned after the riots of 1938. Although the building was destroyed after 1948, it was reopened in October 2008 after acquisition by a Religious Zionist group and subsequent refurbishment.

== History ==
=== Establishment ===
In 1862 students of the Chassam Sofer, Rabbi Moses Sofer, arrived in Jerusalem from Hungary and established a community called Shomrei HaChomos, meaning Guardians of the Walls. A property was acquired in 1875 and a yeshiva was built that was situated approximately 100 m (330 ft) from the Chain Gate on al-Wad Street, in today's Muslim Quarter. The courtyard was purchased from the Muslim Khaladi family. The building was financed by Rabbi Yitzchok Ratsdorfer, a diamond merchant who belonged to the Hasidic group Belz, .

In 1892, the community established a neighborhood outside the Old City walls called Batei Ungarin, part of the neighborhood now known as Meah Shearim. In 1904, the yeshiva in the Old City was expanded and a second story was added. While construction was taking place, the Ottoman authorities warned that the extension would not be allowed. They opposed the fact that its roof would end up being taller than the Dome of the Rock. Construction of the roof was completed overnight, ensuring that the building would be finished. Turkish law stated that once a building had been erected, it could no longer be demolished.

The building accommodated the yeshiva on the ground floor called Ohr Meir and its students held study sessions 24 hours a day. The top floor accommodated two prayer rooms, one for the Chasidim, who use Nusach Sefard, and one for the Perushim, who use Nusach Ashkenaz. The building also contained a mikvah.

=== Abandonment ===
Although the riots of 1920 and 1929 disturbed the running of the yeshiva, Jews still frequented the building until Arab violence forced them to vacate the premises during the 1938 riots. Members relocated to Meah Shearim, and the building was rented to Arabs until the 1948 Arab–Israeli War, during which it was destroyed.

Its members relocated their entire organization, Kolel Shomrei HaChomos, to other locations in the city, including Meah Shearim, Givat Shaul, and more recently Ramat Shlomo, where they built new buildings and synagogues called Kiryas Shomrei HaChomos. Kolel Shomrei HaChomos is closely affiliated with the Edah HaChareidis and considered part of it.

=== Rededication ===
In 1967, after the Six-Day War, all that remained intact was the ground floor of the building, which was turned into a Jewish book store.

Years later the Religious Zionist organization Ateret Cohanim encouraged an American charity funded by American Jewish businessman Irving Moskowitz, a regular donor to right-wing groups in East Jerusalem, to buy the building. The organization then gave the Western Wall Heritage Foundation the right to manage the synagogue site and the excavations. In October 2008 the yeshiva was officially reopened as a synagogue.

== Gallery ==
Interior of the synagogue in the 1920s

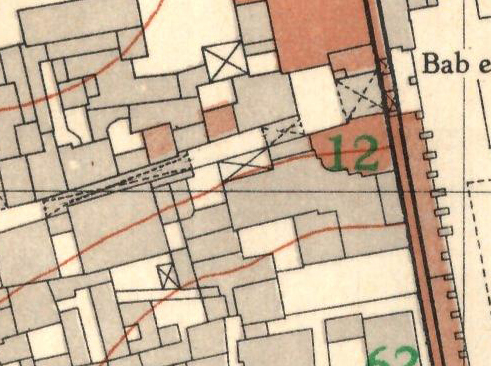
The area of building (not highlighted) in the 1936-47 Survey of Palestine map of the Old City. The Madrasah al-Tankiziya is labelled 12).

The shell of the destroyed yeshiva, undated

== See also ==
- History of the Jews in Israel
- List of synagogues in Israel
- Synagogues of Jerusalem
