= Al-Wad Street =

Street in the old city of Jerusalem

- Hagai
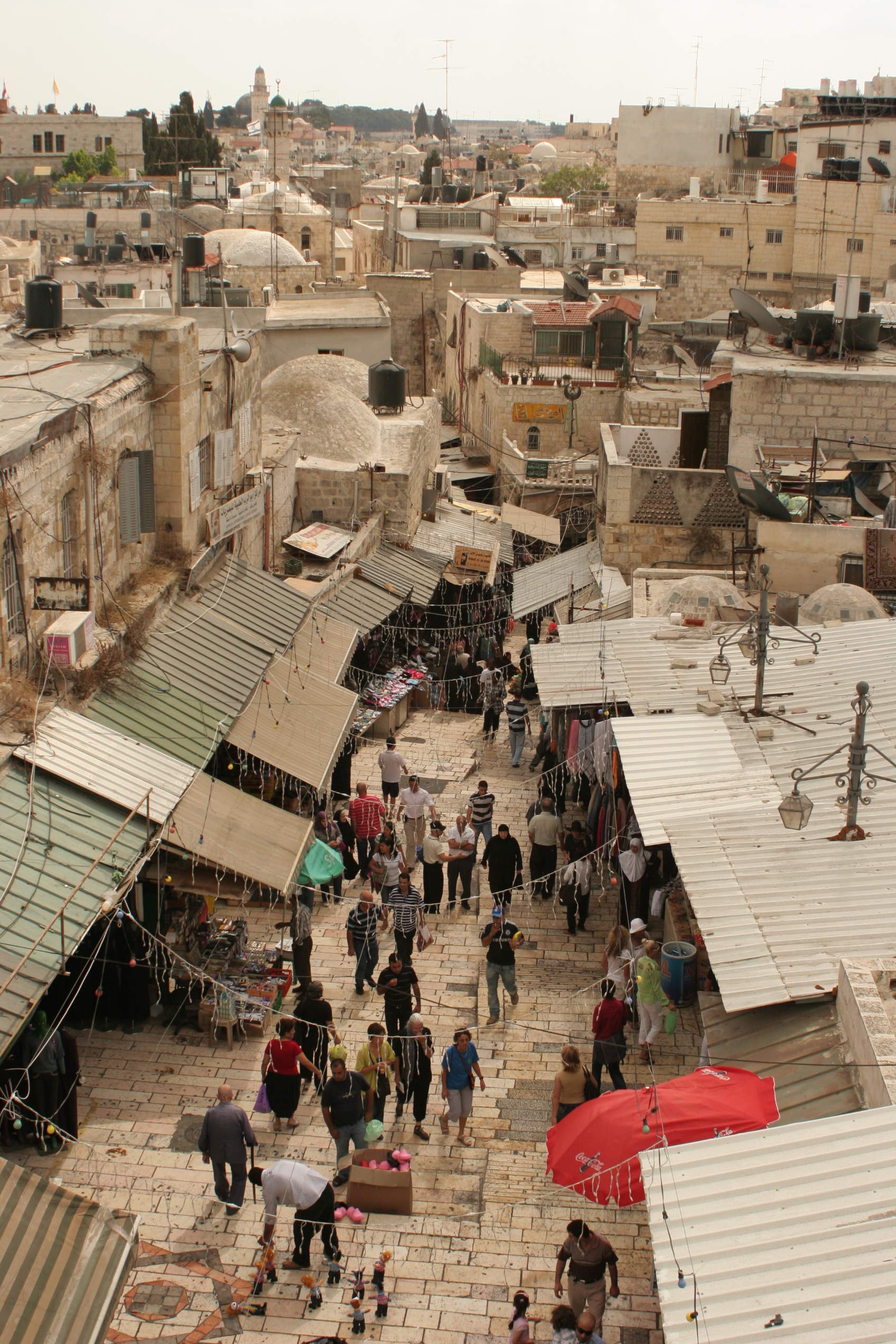
- The start of Al-wad street at Damascus gate, from top
- Interactive map of Al-Wad Street
- Native name: طريق الواد (Arabic)
- Namesake: Tyropoeon Valley
- Quarter: Muslim Quarter
- From: Damascus Gate
- To: Entrance of the Western Wall

Al-Wad Street (Arabic: طريق الواد, or "Hagai street" Hebrew: רחוב הגיא) is a street in the Old City of Jerusalem stretching from Damascus Gate to Chain Gate street. The street dates back to the Roman rule of Jerusalem, and is home to many religious and historic sites. It has been described as a "microcosm of the Israeli-Palestine Conflict". Many religious and historic sites on the street are located in close proximity, often within a few metres of one another, despite their association with different religious and ethnic communities. Israeli settlers and Palestinian Arabs also reside in close proximity along the street.

== Name ==
The street is known as tariq al-wad in Arabic, in Hebrew, it known as "Hagai" street (Hebrew: רחוב הגיא), both names mean "the valley". The name is derived from the Tyropoeon Valley on which the street resides.

== Sites ==
The street intersects with Via Dolorosa for around 200 meters, it is frequented by visitors who observe some Christian holidays. The street runs parallel to the Al-Aqsa complex.

- Sabil al-Wad (or Sabil Tariq al-Wad, Arabic: سبيل طريق الواد) is one of the six wall-mounted public sabils commissioned by Sultan Suleiman the Magnificent in Jerusalem. It is located on the eastern side of the Street, near the southern end of the western entrance to the cotton Merchants' Market. The fountain was constructed in 943 AH (1536/1537 CE) during Suleiman's urban and architectural works in the city. The structure is rectangular in form and is flanked by twisted columns topped with carved capitals.
- Ariel Sharon's house: One of the houses on the street is owned by former Prime Minister of Israel Ariel Sharon, the house is commonly known as "Sharon's House", the house was purchased in 1987, a 3 meter long flag of Israel hangs on the house. Despite the purchase, Sharon has rarely slept in the house.
- Austrian Pilgrim Hospice to the Holy Family: The Austrian hospice, established in 1854, is located at the intersection of al-Wad street and Via Dolorosa.
- Ohel Yitzchak Synagogue

== History ==
=== Roman period ===
Roman vs modern Jerusalem

Basic schematic map of Jerusalem, as rebuilt by Hadrian (a reconstruction known as Aelia Capitolina), showing the two main north-south roads (Cardo Maximus and Cardo Minimus), and the two main east-west roads (Decumanus Maximus and Decumanus Minimus).

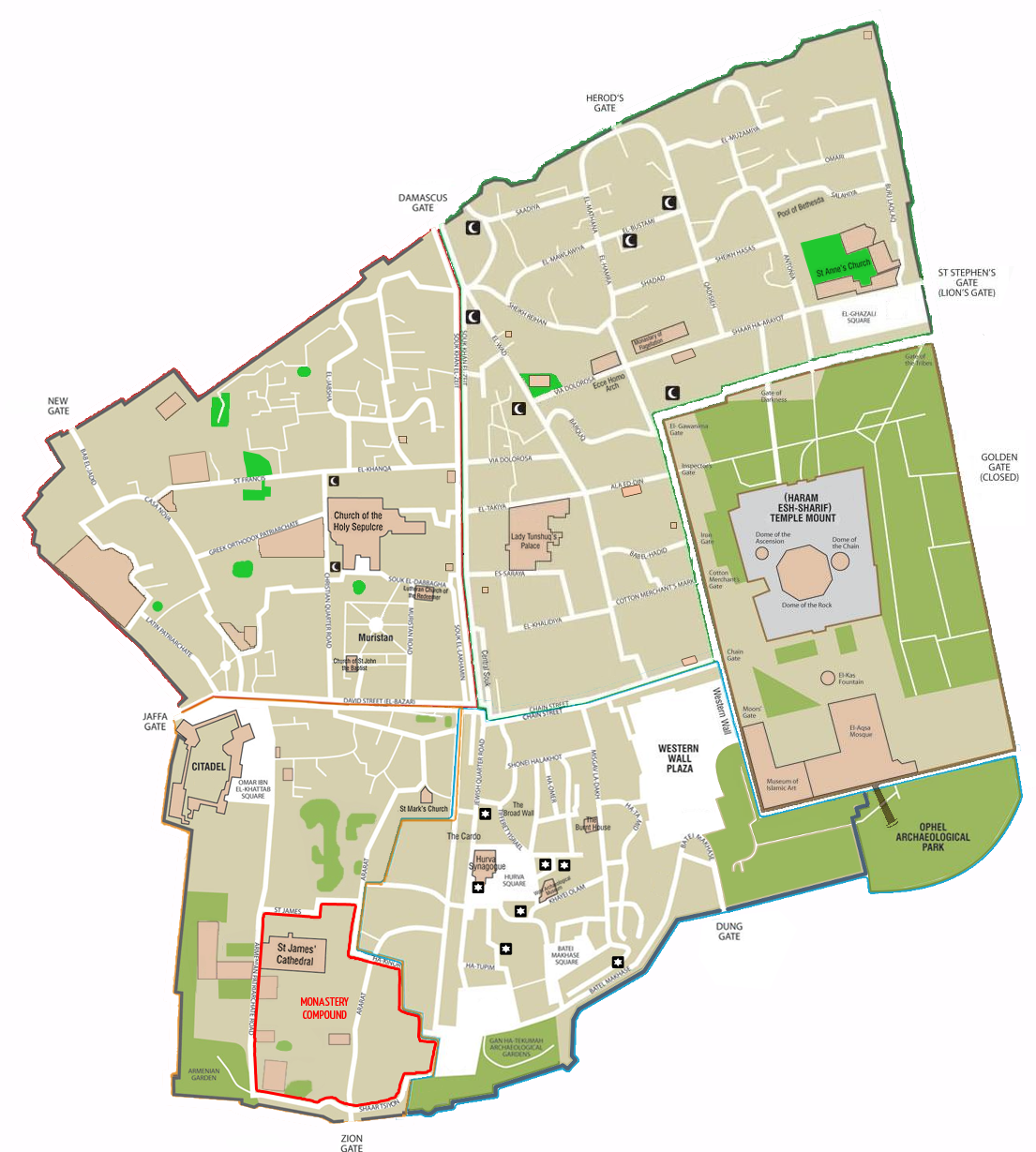
Modern day map of Jerusalem, al-wad street and suq khan ez-zait can be trace on it from north, where they split-off at Damascus gate, to south

During the Roman period, the street ran through Tyropoeon Valley and formed the eastern cardo of Aelia Capitolina; the colony established by Emperor Hadrian in the 2nd century CE. It was one of two cardines, the other being decumanus maximus. The path of the cardo is reflected in the modern-day al-wad street. Archeological remains of the eastern Cardo were found in 20 different locations, it is estimated to be c.800 meters long.

=== Crusader period ===
During the Crusader rule of Jerusalem, the road served as a main street, and a market was established on it, the market extended until around 40 meters before the Al-Aqsa. The Crusader market was mostly in ruins by the 13th or 14the century, during the Mamluk period.

=== Ottoman era ===
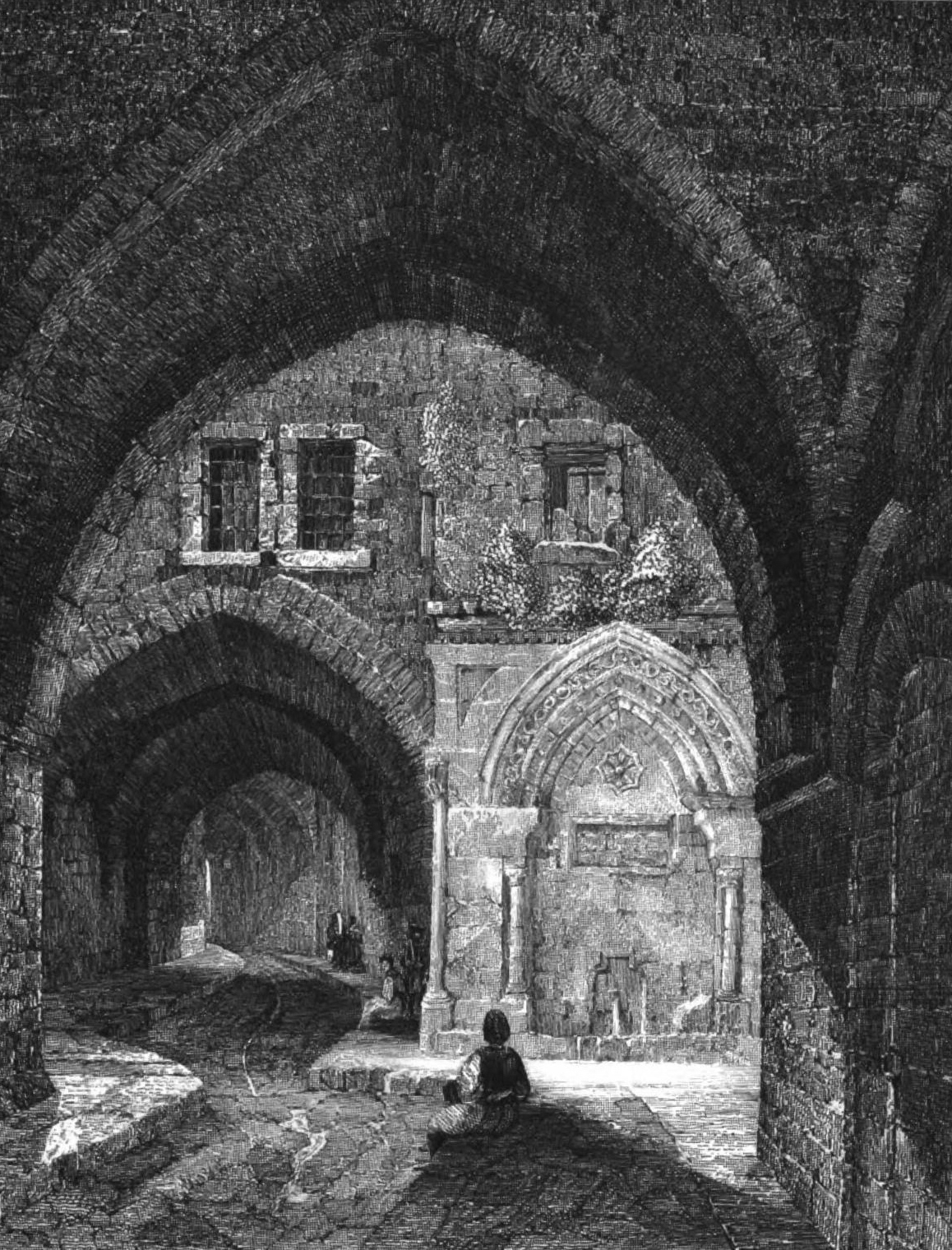
The street as illustrated by Adrien Egron, 1837, the sabil is seen on the right.

The 1905 census by the Ottoman authorities counted 388 Jewish family heads and 383 Muslim family heads living in the al-Wad area, according to historian Vincent Lemire, this reflects a broader pattern of lack of ethnoreligious homogeniety in the quarters of the old city at the time. Lemire also noted that the residents of the al-Wad neighbourhood in combination with Chain Gate street made up 50% of the population despite the 2 streets combined taking up only 1 third of the city's area.

=== Post-1967 ===
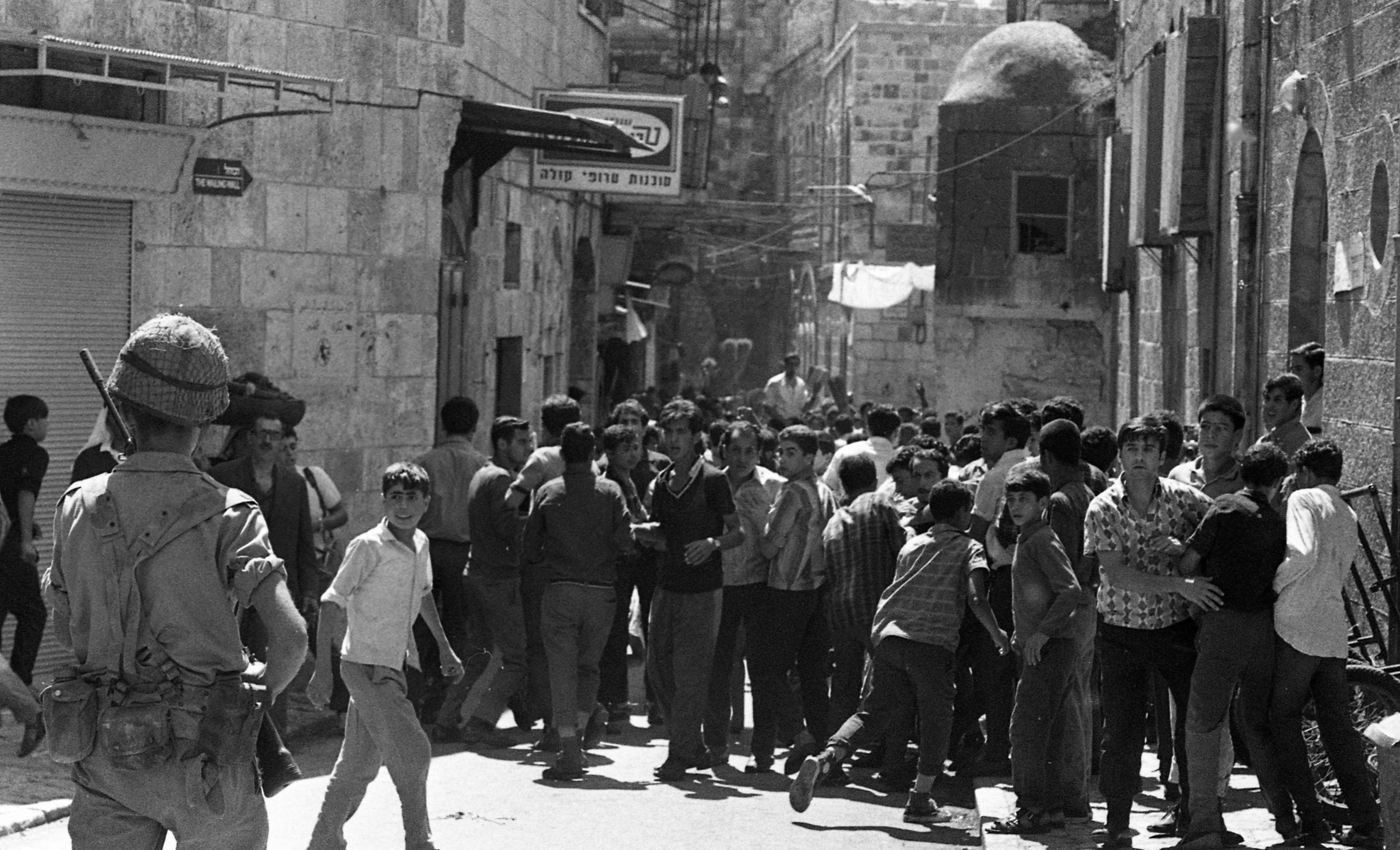
IDF soldiers on the street, south of the Church of Our Lady of Sorrows. From the Dan Hadani collection, Israel Press and Photo Agency, 1969.

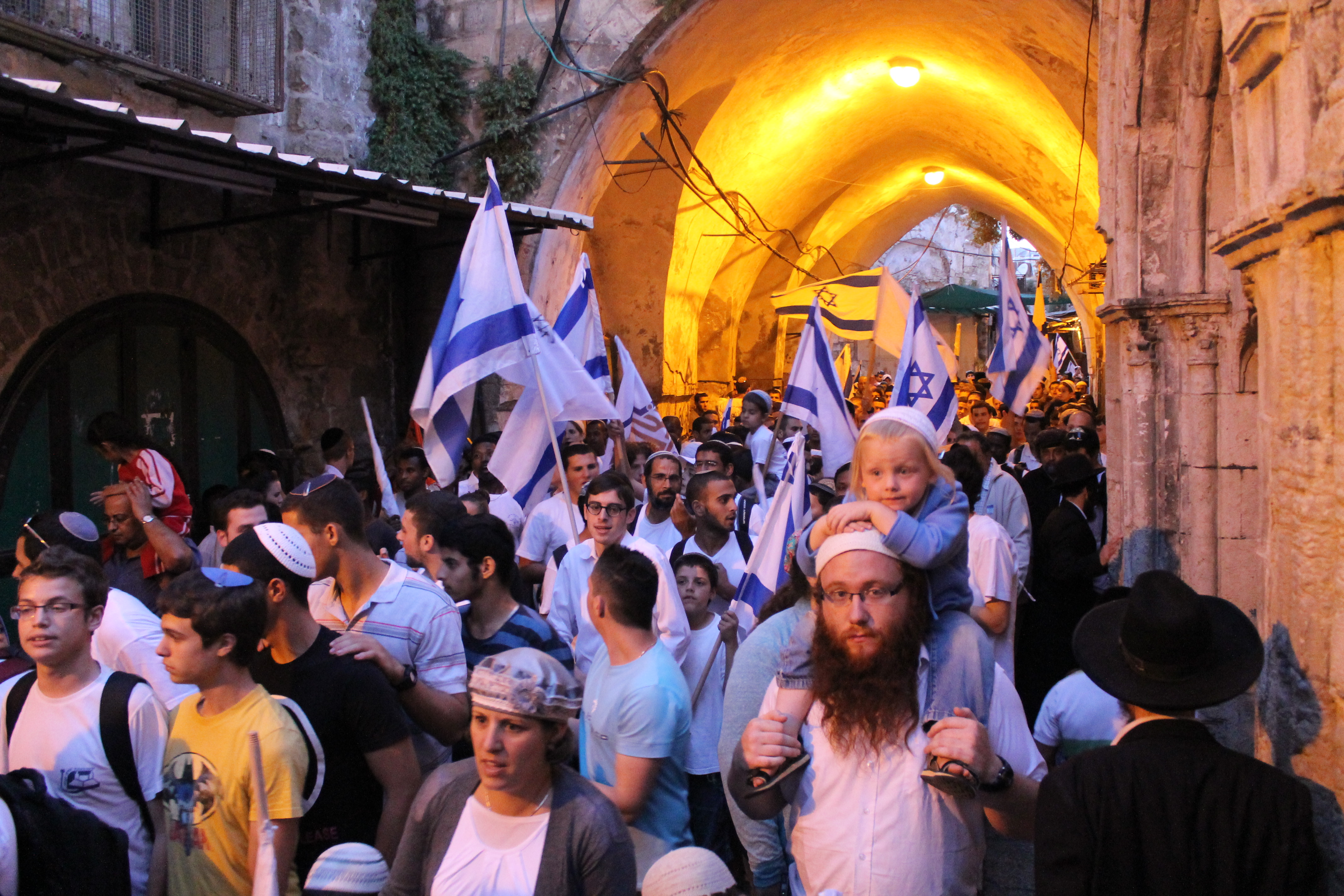
Jerusalem Day march passing through the street, 2012.

After Israel gained control of Jerusalem in 1967, organizations like Ateret Cohanim (formed 1978) began settling into the street, this resulted in Palestinian Arabs and Israeli settlers living in close proximity to one another, sometimes within the same building. In 1978, Ariel Sharon purchased a house on the street, the house was previously owned by Moshe Wittenberg, who purchased it in 1884.

Though not part of the original route, one of the two routes of the Jerusalem Day march was later altered to pass through Al-Wad Street, with marchers entering through Damascus Gate and proceeding toward the Jewish quarter. In 2024, the Israel Police said that it will regulate pedestrian and vehicle traffic during the march, according to Yedioth Ahronoth, their main concern being potential clashes with shop owners on al-Wad street and near Damascus gate. Haaretz reported in 2025 that Muslim shop keepers on the street close their shops during the Jerusalem Day march in fear of property damage.

== Gallery ==
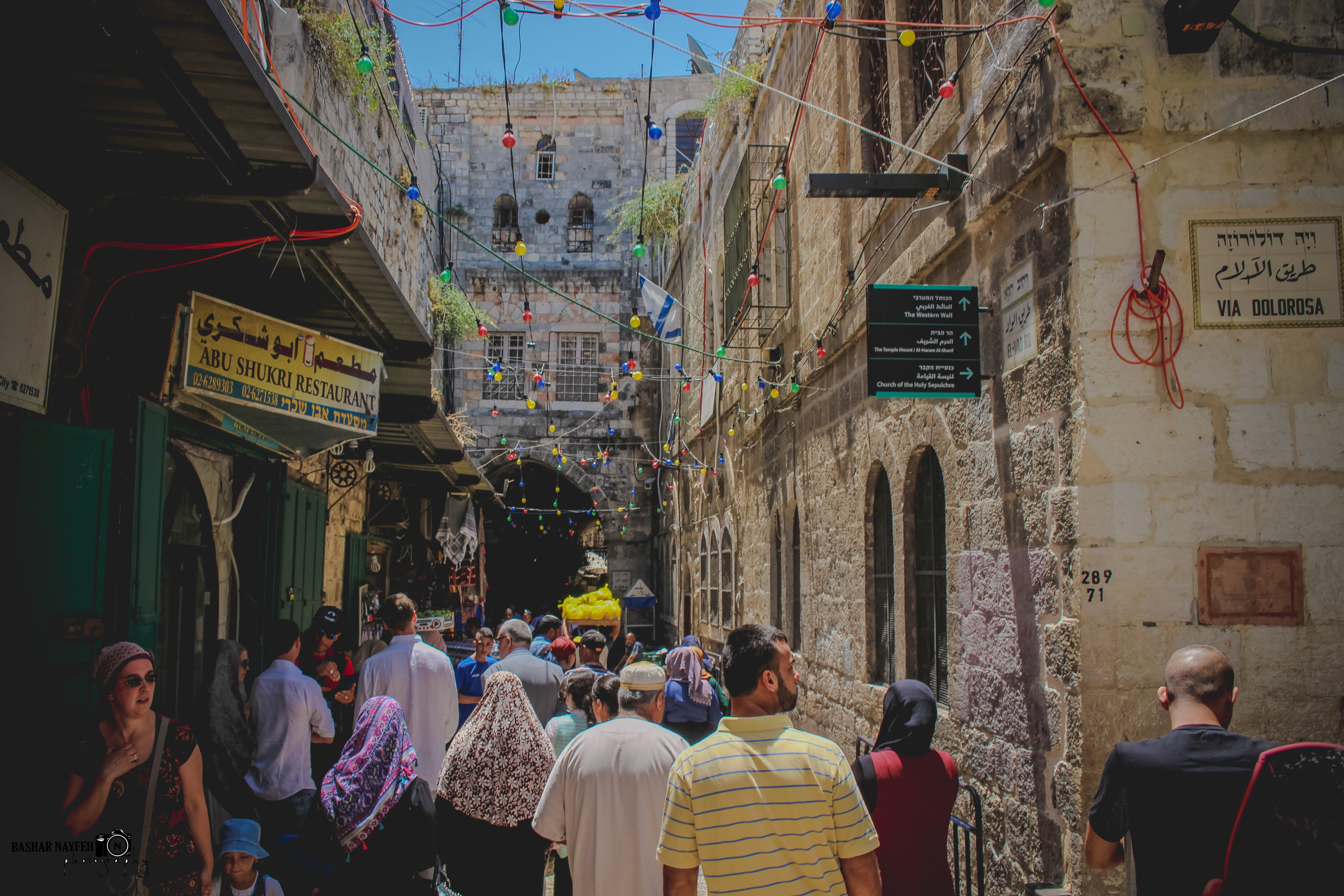
Intersection of al-Wad street and Via Dolorosa

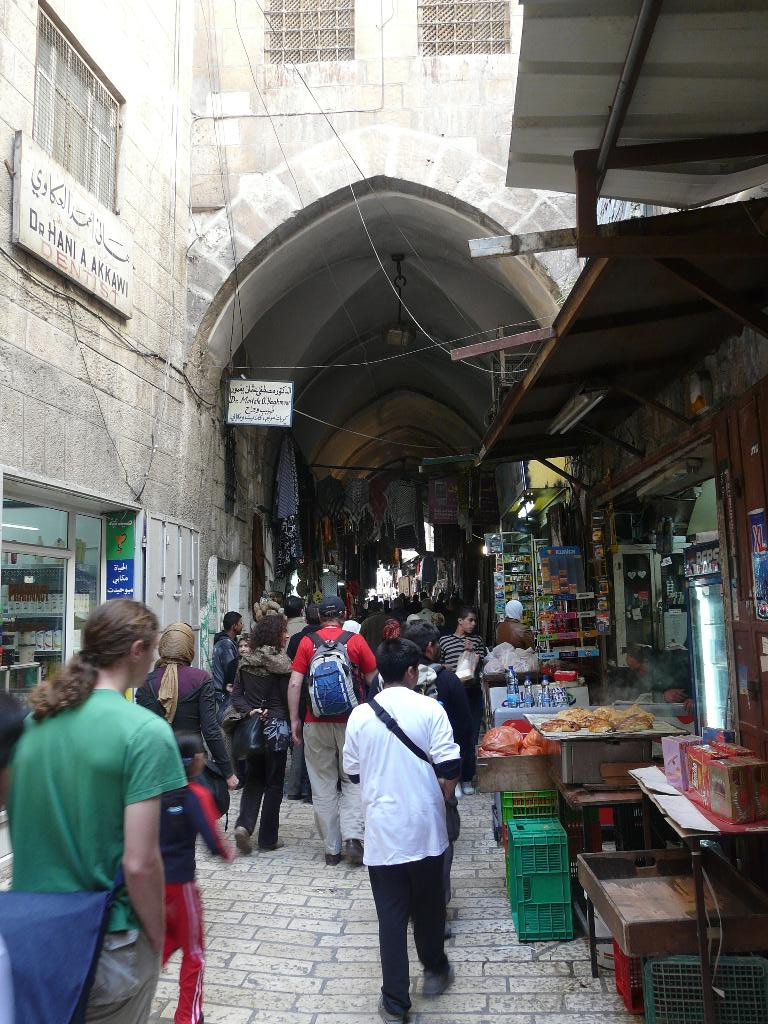
Roofed section of the market, 2009

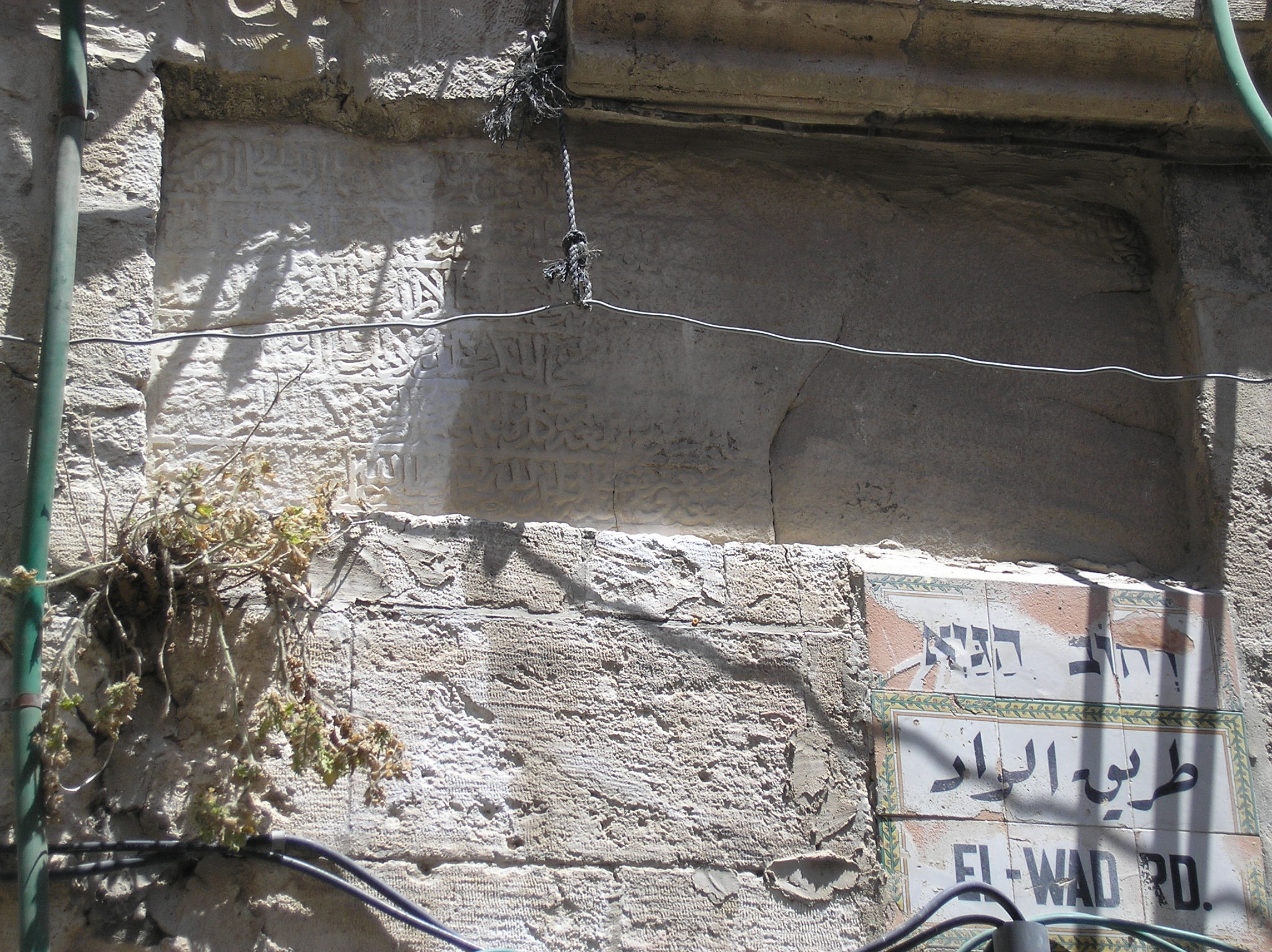
Trilingual street sign naming al-Wad street to the right of a medieval Arabic inscription

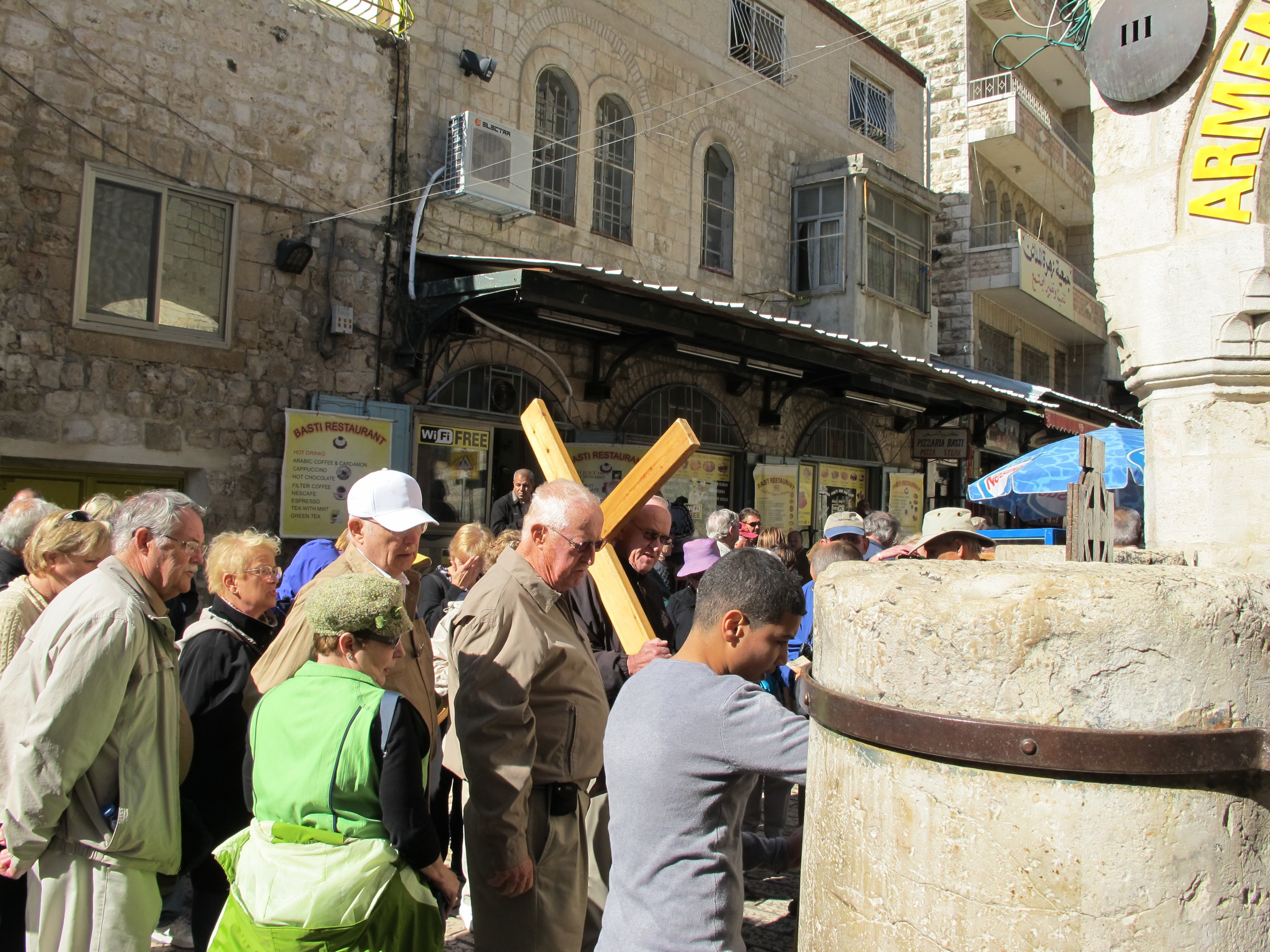
Procession on Via Dolorosa in 2011, at the third station.

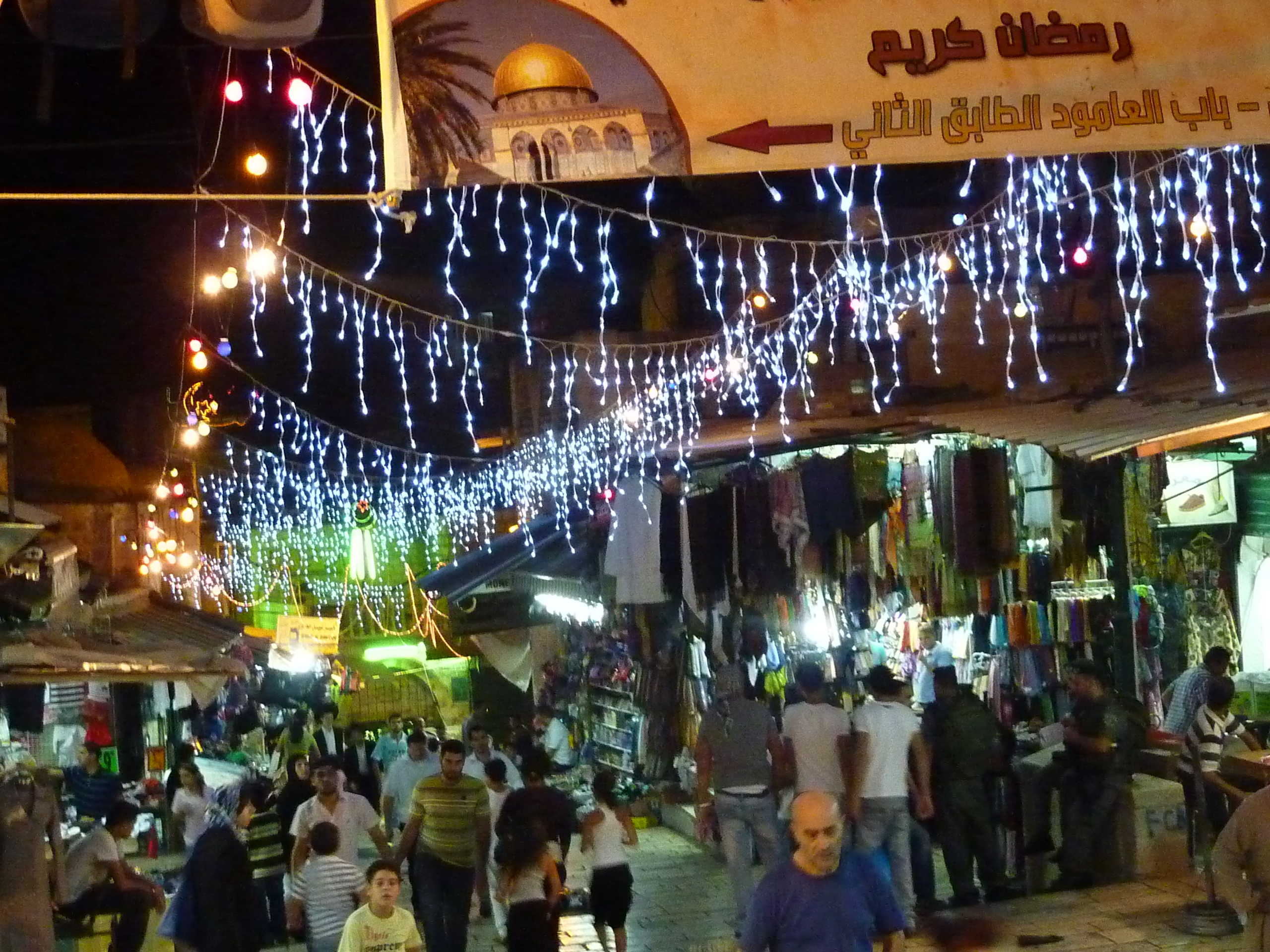
The street on Ramadan of 2010.
