= Chain Gate (Jerusalem) =

Gateway to Al-Aqsa, Jerusalem

Coordinates: 31.77727°N 35.23431°E

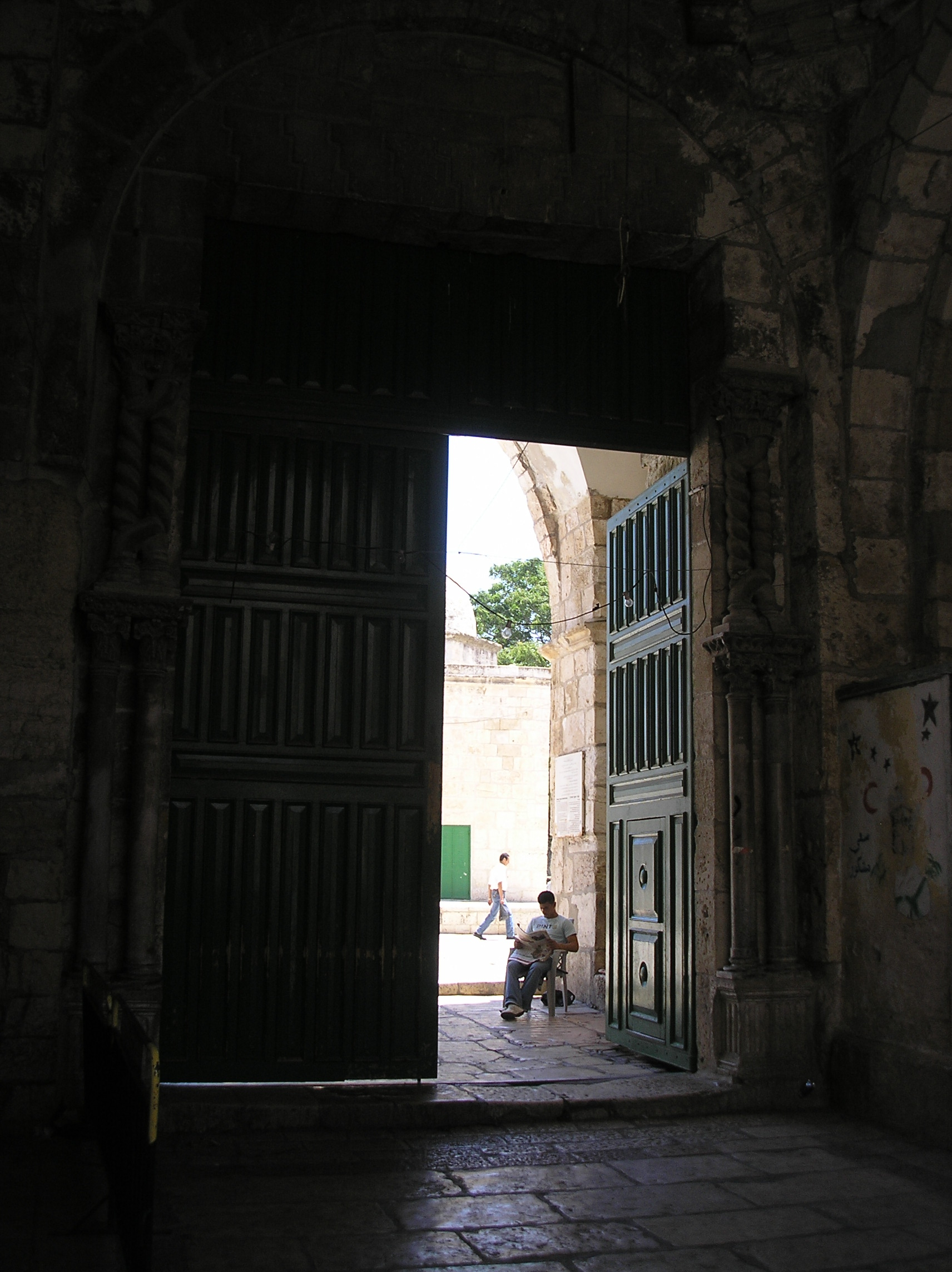
Chain Gate

The Gate of the Chain or Chain Gate (Arabic: باب السلسلة, romanized: Bāb as-Silsila; Hebrew: שער השלשלת, romanized: Sha'ar HaShalshelet) is one half of a double gate, part of the gates to the Al-Aqsa Mosque compound on the Temple Mount in the Old City of Jerusalem. It was known early Islamic period Bāb Daud, which means David's Gate. It was also known as Bāb al-Maḥkama (باب المحكمة), Gate of the Law Court, named after the nearby Maḥkama (Shari'a court) in the Tankiziyya building.

== Description and history ==
Its rectangular doors are 4.5 m high. There is a small opening large enough for one person to pass through when the gate is closed.

Of the double gate, the southern Chain Gate is known today as Bab Al-Silsilah, and its northern twin gate as Bab as-Sakinah (Tranquility Gate). It was considered the most beautiful of the Al-Aqsa mosque gates. The entrance to the Gate of the Sakinah is closed and is not opened except for necessity. It worth to notice that the closure of the northern gate happened a long time ago, with the historian Al-Omari (1345 CE) mentioning this fact. The Gate of the Chain, which is open, is secured by a tall two-wing door, with a small door cut into one wing, large enough for one person to enter when the larger door is closed. According to Nasir-i-Khusraw, in order to reach the gate one had to pass through the market in the eastern section of the city and the gate itself had two openings that led into a large hall. Its construction was renewed in the Ayyubid period, in 1200 CE, during the reign of King Issa.

== Its twin gate ==
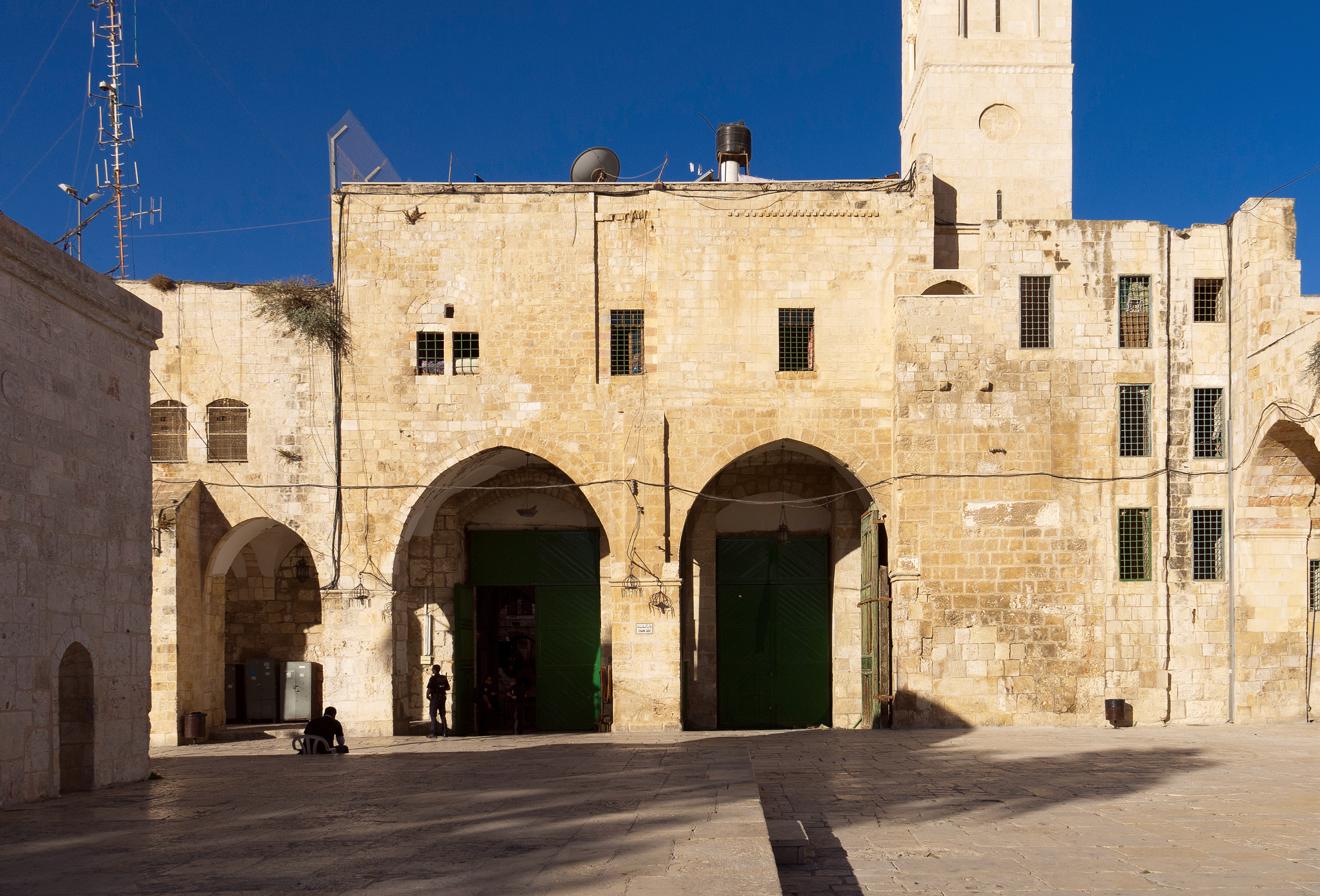
From inside the compound: the Chain Gate (left) and Sakīna Gate (right/north)

Bāb as-Sakīna is the northern half of the double gate that includes the Chain Gate. It is always closed. Its names:

- Bāb as-Sakīna (باب السكينة): the Gate of the Divine Presence, the Gate of God's Presence, or the Gate of Tranquillity. (cf sakīna & سكينة) (Note: The "Gate of the Dwelling" is a rare translation. Sakīna is sometimes translated as "the indwelling (of the divine presence)". cf. a related word with a short i: sakina (سكنة, 'dwelling').)
  - Originally Bāb as-Sakīna was the name of another gate at the Southern Wall, possibly one of the Double Gate.
- Bāb as-Salām (باب السلام): the Gate of Peace.

== Environs ==
The southwestern part of the Muslim Quarter is outside the gate. The neighborhood (Bāb as-Silsila / Bāb al-Silsila) is named after the gate. Chain Gate street leads toward a market (Sūq Bāb as-Silsila) and eventually the gate. Once inside the compound, one can immediately see the Dome of Moses (south) and Fountain of Qasim Pasha (north, also named Sabīl Bāb al-Maḥkama, after the gate). The southwestern colonnade is the closest of the Mawazin.

The Chain Gate Minaret is just north of it. And north of that, one finds the al-Ashrafiyya Madrasa. South of the gate, and part of the compound wall, one sees the at-Tankiziyya Madrasa.

== Archaeology ==
The first bridge built at the site over the Central Valley, to which the so-called Wilson's Arch belongs, dates to c. 20 BCE–20 CE, as confirmed by radiocarbon dating published in 2020, and was probably built by Herod the Great. It is presumed that one of the Second Temple's main gates was located at the site.

The current Street of the Chain leading to the gate is supported by a number of stone arches, now situated underground. In the 1990s, the date of the oldest surviving parts of this viaduct or causeway (sometimes called a "bridge") was still a matter of debate, with a Roman-period date being less well accepted than a later, Byzantine or rather Early Muslim-period one. Archaeological excavations along the western wall of the Al-Aqsa compound have confirmed that the causeway crossed from an elevated position over the main street, which located along and adjacent to the western wall. Its purpose was of offering access to the compound without the need to descend into the valley and climb back up on the Temple Mount. For this reason, some leading archaeologists proposed in the 1990s that the Chain Gate and the bridge were built at the same time, that is: in the early Islamic period.

== Chain Gate after 1967 ==
This Gate is one of the three Gates that open alone for worshipers at the prayers of Isha'a and Fajr since 1967. It is the closest gate leading to the Al-Qibli Musalla hall after the closure of the Maghriba Gate by the Israel. It is also the closest to the Western Wall

== See also ==
- Dome of the Chain, also in the compound
