= Siege of Malatya (1315) =

Egyptian military campaign, 1315

Conquest of Malatya
Date	28 April 1315
Location	Malatya, Turkey
Result	Mamluk victory

Belligerents
Armenian Kingdom of Cilicia	Mamluk Sultanate

Commanders and leaders
Oshin	Tankiz

The conquest of Malatya was led by Tankiz, the viceroy of Syria, under the orders of Sultan al-Nasir Muhammad, resulting in the annexation of Malatya to the Mamluk Sultanate.

== Background ==
In 1315, Sultan al-Nasir Muhammad ibn Qalawun ordered the conquest of the Armenian city of Malatya in central Anatolia because it was supporting the Ilkhanid Mongols.

== Conquest ==
The Egyptian Mamluk forces marched from Cairo and joined up with the forces of Tankiz in the Levant. The fortress of Malatya was conquered and plundered for three days after fighting against Armenian and Mongol forces on 28 April 1315, expanding the scope of the Egyptian Sultanate. Raids were launched on other Armenian fortresses.
