= Muslim Quarter (Jerusalem) =

One of the four traditional quarters of Jerusalem's Old City

Muslim Quarter حارة المسلمين הרובע המוסלמי
- Quarter
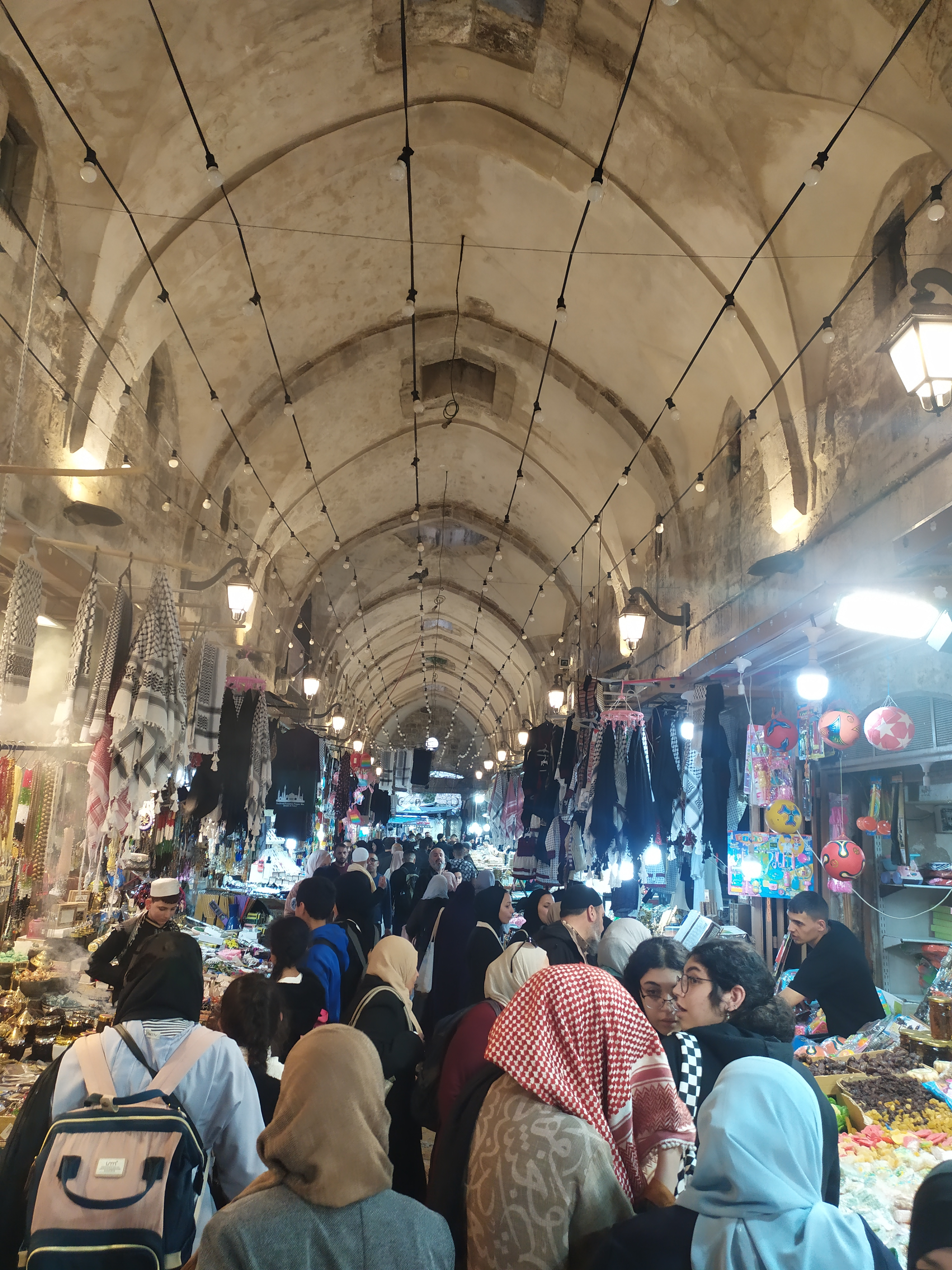
- Cotton Merchants' Market, reconstructed in 1336 by the Mamluk ruler Emir Tankiz, governor of Damascus

- Location within Old City of Jerusalem
- City: Old City of Jerusalem
- Quarter: Muslim Quarter

Area
  - Total: 0.31 km^{2} (0.12 sq mi)

Population
  - Total: 22,000
  - Density: 70,968/km^{2} (183,810/sq mi)
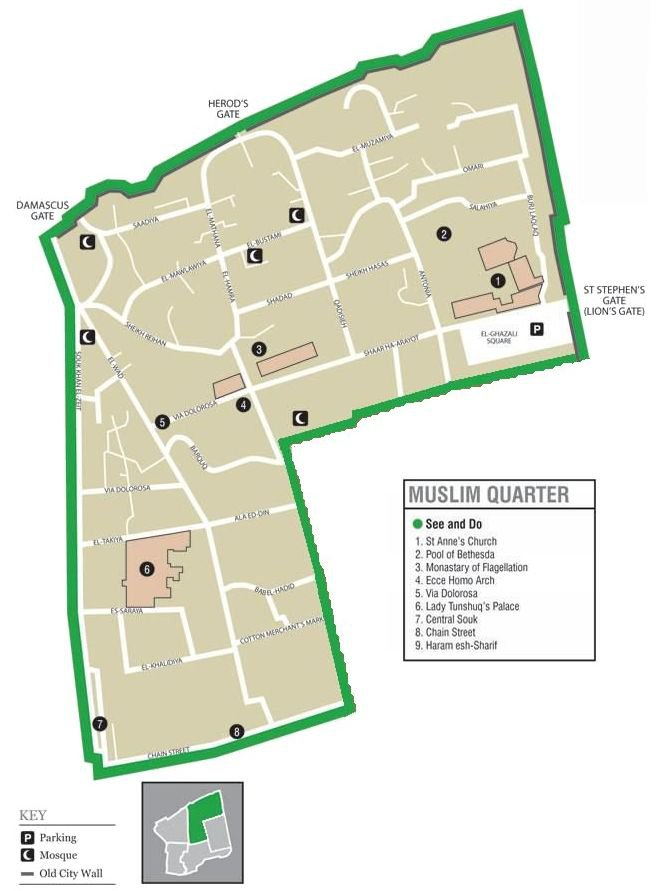

The Muslim Quarter (Arabic: حارة المسلمين, romanized: Ḥāraṫ al-Muslimīn; Hebrew: הרובע המוסלמי, romanized: Ha-Rovah ha-Muslemi) is one of the four sectors of the ancient, walled Old City of Jerusalem. It covers 31 hectares (77 acres) of the northeastern sector of the Old City. The quarter is the largest and most populous of the four quarters and extends from the Lions' Gate in the east, along the northern wall of the Temple Mount in the south, to the Damascus Gate—Western Wall route in the west. The Via Dolorosa starts in this quarter, a path Jesus had to take when he was forced by Roman soldiers. The population of the Muslim Quarter was reported in 2012 as 22,000.

== Boundaries ==
The Muslim Quarter of Jerusalem is bordered by the Christian Quarter to the west, the Jewish Quarter to the south, and the Armenian Quarter to the southwest. The old city walls border the Quarter from the north.

The convention of a "Muslim Quarter", in what was then a Muslim-majority city, may have originated in its current form in the 1841 British Royal Engineers map of Jerusalem, or at least Reverend George Williams' subsequent labelling of it. The city had previously been divided into many more ḥarat (Arabic: حارَة, romanized: ḥārat: "quarters", "neighborhoods", "districts" or "areas", see wikt:حارة). The city had previously been considered in sections relating to a much wider range of medieval groups. From the mid-19th century onwards, with the influx of Jewish immigrants, the areas of the city inhabited by Muslims began to decrease.

The table below shows the evolution of the area today known as the "Muslim Quarter", from 1495 up until the modern system:

	Local divisions				Western divisions	
Date	1495	1500s	1800s	1900	1840s onwards	
Source	Mujir al-Din	Ottoman Census	Traditional system	Ottoman Census	Modern maps	
Quarters	Ghuriyya (Turiyya)		Bab el-Asbat		Muslim Quarter (north)	North-east
Quarters	Bab Hutta	Bab Hutta	Bab Hutta	Bab Hutta	Muslim Quarter (north)	North-east
Quarters	Masharqa				Muslim Quarter (north)	North-east
Quarters	Bani Zayd	Bani Zayd	Sa'diyya	Sa'diyya	Muslim Quarter (north)	North-west
Quarters	Bab el-'Amud	Bab el-'Amud	Bab el-'Amud	Bab el-'Amud	Muslim Quarter (north)	North-west
Quarters	Bani Murra	Bab el-'Amud	Bab el-'Amud	Bab el-'Amud	Muslim Quarter (north)	North-west
Quarters	Marzaban	Bab el-Qattanin	Bab es-Silsila	Wad	Muslim Quarter (south)	South
Quarters	Marzaban	Bab el-Qattanin	Qattanin	Wad	Muslim Quarter (south)	South
Quarters	Marzaban	Aqabet es-Sitta	Wad	Wad	Muslim Quarter (south)	South
Quarters	Marzaban	Aqabet es-Sitta	'Aqabet et-Takiya	Wad	Muslim Quarter (south)	South

== History ==
The Muslim Quarter had a mixed population of Jews, Muslims and Christians until the 1929 Palestine riots.

Some 60 Jewish families now live in the Muslim Quarter. Yeshivat Ateret Yerushalayim is the largest yeshiva.

In 2007, the Israeli government started funding the construction of The Flowers Gate development plan, the first Jewish settlement inside the Muslim Quarter since 1967. It would include 20 apartments and a synagogue.

== Landmarks ==
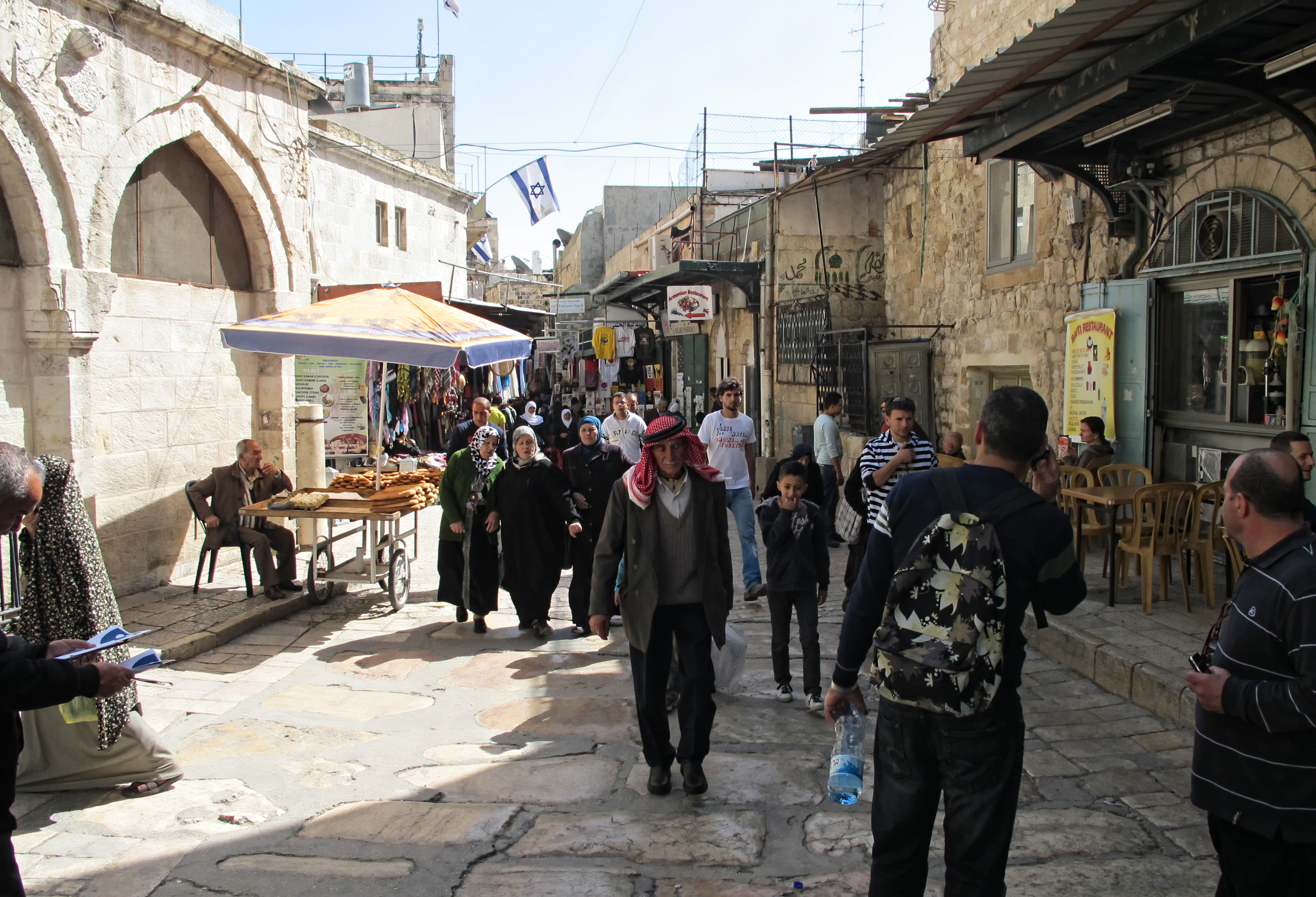
Al-Wad Street in the Muslim Quarter, which forms part of the Via Dolorosa in Jerusalem

Jewish landmarks include the Kotel Katan or Little Western Wall, and the Western Wall Tunnels, which run below the neighborhood along the Western Wall. There are many Roman and Crusader remains in the quarter. The first seven Stations of the Cross on Via Dolorosa (Way of the Cross) are located there.

== See also ==
- Armenian Quarter
- Ateret Cohanim
- Bab Al Huta
- Birket Israel
- Christian Quarter
- Church of the Flagellation
- Galicia Courtyard
- Jerusalem in Islam
- Jewish Quarter
- Ohel Yitzchak Synagogue
- Pool of Bethesda
- Religious significance of the Syrian region
- St Anne's Church
- Via Dolorosa
- Zedekiah's Cave
