= Tankiz =

- Na'ib al-Saltana ("Viceroy") of Syria
- Reign: 1312–1340
- Predecessor: Sayf al-Din Kipchak
- Successor: Yalbugha al-Umari
- Died: May 1340; Alexandria, Egypt
- Burial: Damascus, Syria
- Spouse: Khawand Sutaytah bint Sayf al-Din Kawkabay al-Mansuri
- Issue: Ali; Muhammad; Ahmad; Qutlughmalik
Names
- Sayf ad-Din Tankiz al-Husami an-Nasiri
- Dynasty: Bahri
- Religion: Sunni Islam

Sayf ad-Din Tankiz ibn Abdullah al-Husami an-Nasiri, better known simply as Tankiz (Arabic: تنكز; died May 1340), was the Damascus-based Mamluk na'ib al-saltana (viceroy) of Syria from 1312 to 1340 during the reign of the Bahri Mamluk sultan an-Nasir Muhammad.

== Early life and career ==
According to a Mamluk-era biographer of Tankiz, Khalil ibn Aybak as-Safadi, Tankiz was brought to Cairo as a young child by a man named al-Khwajah Alaa al-Din al-Siwasi. The name tankiz was the Arabic version of the Turkic word teñiz, meaning "sea". Tankiz was raised in Cairo and was later bought by Sultan Husam al-Din al-Lajin in 1296, becoming a mamluk (slave soldier) in his service until January 1299, when Lajin was killed. Following Lajin's death, Tankiz became a bodyguard (khassakiya) of Sultan an-Nasir Muhammad in 1299. In December 1299, Tankiz participated in the Battle of Wadi al-Khazandar between the Mamluks and the Mongol Ilkhanate and the latter's allies. Sometime during an-Nasir Muhammad's second reign (January 1299–March 1309), Tankiz was made an amir ashara (emir of ten mamluks). During these years, Tankiz studied the hadiths of Sahih Bukhari and Sahih Muslim and was tutored by several Mamluk ulama (Muslim scholars).

Because of his initial tenure with Lajin, Tankiz was a relative outsider when he became part of an-Nasir Muhammad's inner circle of mamluks. Nonetheless, Tankiz became one of the sultan's closest friends. In 1309, when an-Nasir Muhammad went into voluntary exile at al-Karak in Transjordan after he was toppled by Baybars al-Jashnakir, Tankiz accompanied him until an-Nasir Muhammad left to take back the sultanate in 1310. According to historian Stephan Conermann, while Tankiz and an-Nasir Muhammad were posted at al-Karak, an-Nasir Muhammad sent Tankiz "on some dangerous missions" to Syria, which he executed successfully. Thus, when an-Nasir Muhammad regained the sultanate later that year, Tankiz was given the rank of amir tabalkhanah (emir of forty mamluks). On an-Nasir Muhammad's instructions, Tankiz was then trained how to govern by Arghun an-Nasiri, the na'ib as-saltana (viceroy) of Egypt.

== Viceroy of Syria ==
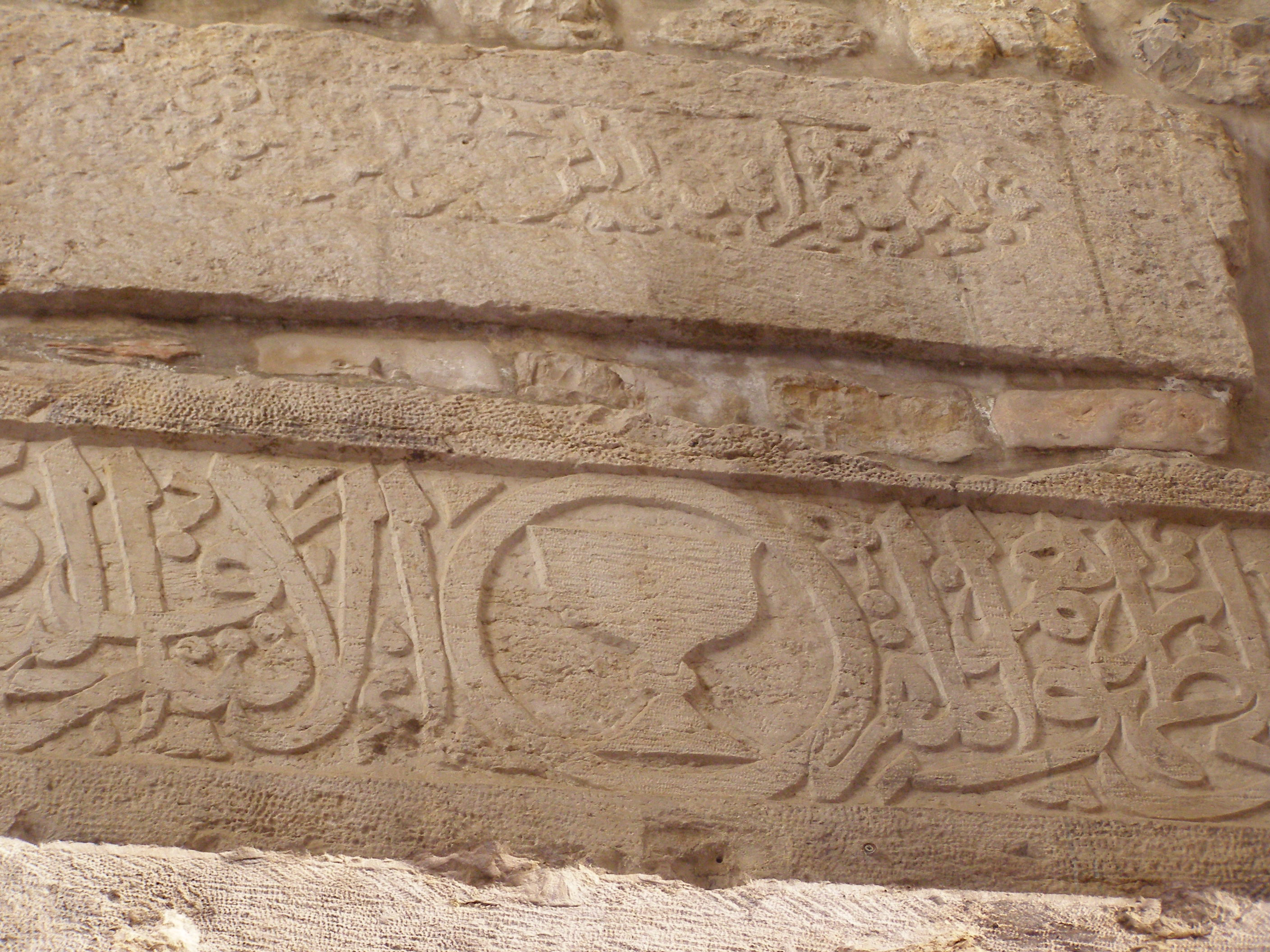
An inscription on Tankiziyya Madrasa in Jerusalem bearing the symbol of Tankiz

Tankiz was appointed viceroy of Syria (na'ib al-saltana al-sham) by an-Nasir Muhammad in August 1312. His quick ascent to this post was a rare occurrence because he did not undergo the stages of promotion that traditionally preceded the appointment. He also held the additional title al-kafil al-mamalik al-shamiyya, which translates as "supreme governor of the noble provinces of Damascus." Tankiz had been very close with the sultan and his appointment was in line with other provincial and sub-provincial appointments of umara (plural form of emir) in an-Nasir Muhammad's inner circle. By 1314 Tankiz had gained unprecedented rule over the Levant. The governors of its sub-provinces (nuwabb), including Homs, Hama, Tripoli, Aleppo and Safad, were officially under his authority, to the extent that any letter the lower-level governors sent to the sultan would have to be inspected first by Tankiz himself; if he disagreed with a letter's content, he would have it returned to its sender.

In 1315, Tankiz was dispatched by an-Nasir Muhammad as the supreme commander of Egyptian and Syrian mamluk regiments in an offensive to capture the Mongol-allied fortress of Malatya in Anatolia. Tankiz led his army dressed in the clothes of a king and "on his horse, all was gold, even his hunting drum," according to Mamluk-era chronicler Ibn Sasra. Tankiz managed to conquer Malatya and successfully embarked on a number of raids against nearby Lesser Armenia, which was also allied with the Mongols.

Tankiz went on the Hajj pilgrimage to Mecca in 1321, after gaining permission from an-Nasir Muhammad. In 1327, Tankiz oversaw the management of awqaf (Islamic endowments) in Damascus. He ordered infrastructural repairs, reduced government workers' salaries and removed superfluous stipends in order that the awqaf conformed with their original purposes. In a major example of his budget cuts, Tankiz had 130 teachers dismissed from the al-Shamiyya al-Juwaniyya Madrasa whose waqf only entitled the institution to 20 teachers. Tankiz compromised with the ulema (Muslim scholars) and agreed that 60 jurists would remain employed by the madrasa (Islamic law college). Tankiz also ordered the eviction of inhabitants living illegally on the grounds of the Umayyad Mosque and ordered them to pay rent for the time that they had lodged there. The payments he exacted from them were used to fund repairs and the redecoration of the mosque. By 1329, the waqf of the Umayyad Mosque had a surplus of 70,000 silver dirhams, which Tankiz ordered to be used for further repairs and marble work. Similar action was undertaken in Hama. From the 1331 onward, Tankiz would take annual trips to meet an-Nasir Muhammad in Egypt (1331–32, 1333, 1334, 1338, 1340). In his 1339 trip, he also visited Upper Egypt.

In 1334 he ordered the Druze ruler of Beirut, Nasir ad-Din al-Husayn, to relocate to the city from the Chouf mountain following a Genoese attack against the city and its Catalan traders. In March 1337, Tankiz had negotiated the release of two emirs of the Cairo Citadel, Tashtamur Akhdar and Qutlubugha al-Fakhri, who had been imprisoned by an-Nasir as a result of an alleged assassination plot. Their imprisonment led to a mass hunger strike by their mamluks and an-Nasir was compelled to have them released to avoid a mutiny. Tashtamur remained in his post while Qutlubugha was transferred to Tankiz's supervision in Syria.

=== Infrastructural works ===
Throughout his rule, Tankiz engaged in several building works, "changing [sic] the face" of Damascus with the new public structures, according to historian Moshe Sharon. Before engaging in architectural work, Tankiz had the city's infrastructure revamped. These projects included the repairing, overhauling and cleaning of the canal systems which supplied water throughout Damascus. The canal system was characterized by two separate underground systems, one of which distributed water from the Barada, Banias and Qanawat rivers, to the city's houses, mosques, schools, hamaams (public bathhouses) and fountains, and another whose purpose was drainage. The work cost 300,000 silver dirhams.

Other projects included various civil planning pursuits that controlled unorganized expansion, particularly in the northern and western parts of the city and the establishment of important streets, bridges and spaces to ease transportation and communication in the district. Although several shops and benches were demolished in the newer outer neighborhoods of the city in order to widen the road networks, the buildings of the old inner city were not affected. These works were spread roughly over a decade.

== Downfall ==
From the 1330s, an-Nasir Muhammad began to assert his authority over many of his most powerful emirs. Following the execution of a leading emir, Baktamur as-Saqi in 1332, Tankiz, wary of sharing Baktamur's fate, paid a visit to an-Nasir Muhammad who subsequently contented himself that Tankiz was fearful of him. According to medieval Mamluk sources, tensions between Tankiz and an-Nasir in the form of relatively minor quarrels and incidents in the late 1330s led to the eventual downfall of Tankiz in 1340. According to Amalia Levanoni, an author specializing in Mamluk affairs, an-Nasir Muhammad bore "a silent grudge" towards Tankiz when the latter refused three of his requests to release mamluk Juban from imprisonment in Shawbak, in Transjordan.

Tensions grew further when in 1339, Tankiz levied a punitive tax on the Christians of Damascus to fund repairs for property damage resulting from a series of arson attacks that the Christians were alleged to have committed. An-Nasir Muhammad had discouraged Tankiz from imposing the tax to avoid deteriorating already sour relations with the Byzantine Empire, but then ordered the tax revenue to be transferred to the treasury in Egypt, a request Tankiz refused.

Simmering conflict between the two reached its apex in 1339 after Tankiz's request to hunt in Qal'at Ja'bar in northern Syria was rejected by an-Nasir Muhammad. The latter feared that Tankiz would use the hunting trip as a cover to seek asylum with Dhu al-Qadir, chief of the Turkmen tribes of northern Syria who recognized the authority of Tankiz, but not of an-Nasir Muhammad. Tankiz retorted that an-Nasir Muhammad had "lost his mind" and listened only to his young entourage. Moreover, he communicated to an-Nasir Muhammad that he "would have advised him to seat one of his sons [on the throne]" and Tankiz "would run the affairs of the state in his name." With Tankiz being in a strong position to launch a decisive revolt in Syria, an-Nasir Muhammad interpreted his words as a threat to usurp the throne. In an-Nasir Muhammad's view, Tankiz had become too independent of his authority.

An-Nasir Muhammad dispatched Emir Bashtak an-Nasiri and 350 of Bashtak's mamluks to Syria to arrest Tankiz in 1340. Following his capture, Tankiz was brought to Cairo and then imprisoned in Alexandria. He was subsequently executed in May. When his assets were confiscated, they consisted of 36,000 dinars, 1,500,000 silver dirhams, clothing worth 640,000 dinars, palaces, khans, baths and markets in Damascus valued at 2,600,000 silver dirhams, and other properties in Homs, Beirut, and smaller towns valued at 900,000 silver dirhams and 4,200 animals. The confiscated wealth of Tankiz was distributed among the senior emirs. In 1343, two years after an-Nasir Muhammad died, Tankiz's body was brought to Damascus where it was buried in the mausoleum he had built during his rule.

== Architectural legacy ==
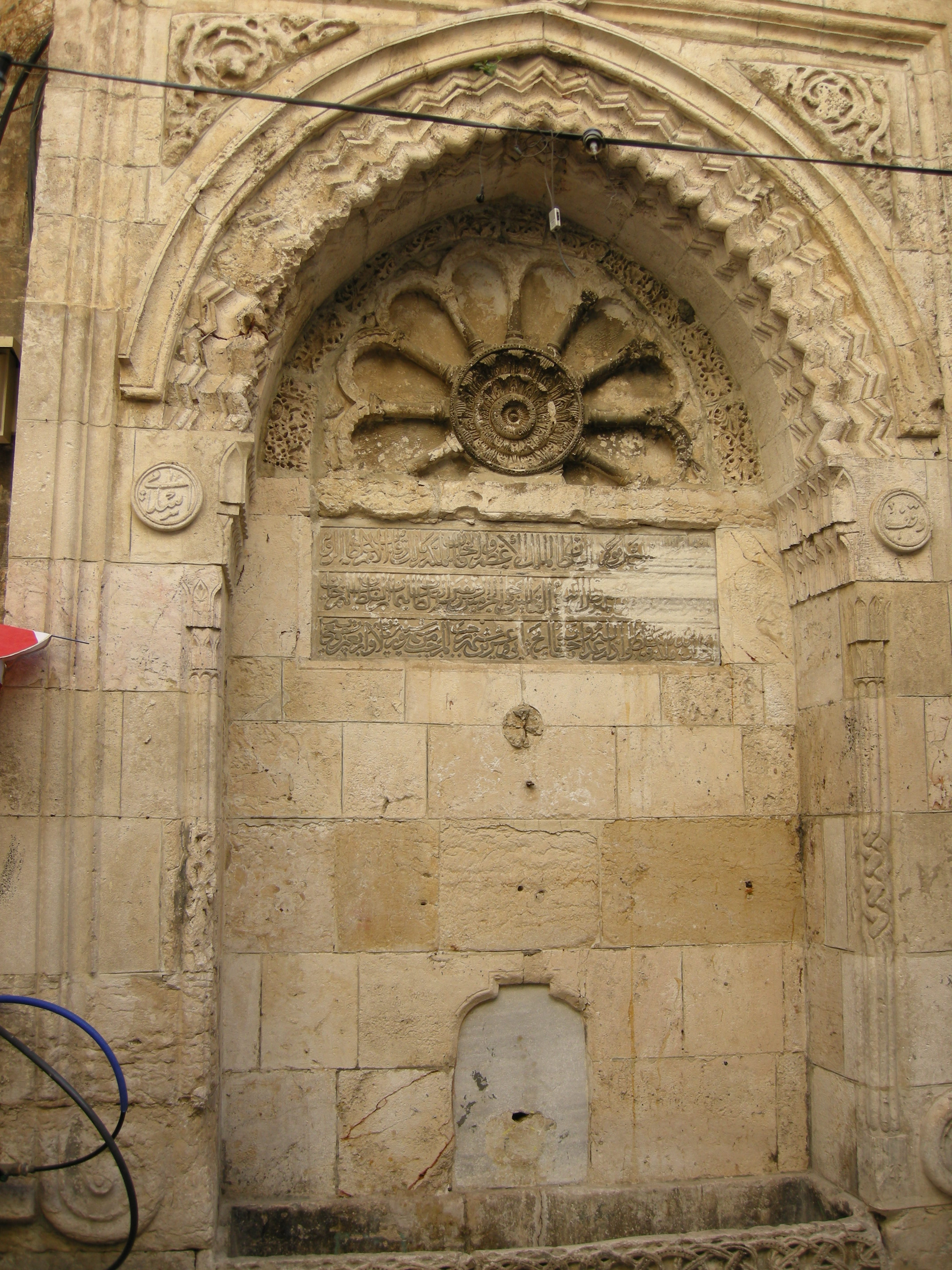
Part of the Tankiziyya Madrasa in Jerusalem

Throughout his rule, Tankiz embarked on several architectural projects. In Damascus alone nearly 40 public institutions, including mosques and schools, were constructed or restored either under the direct orders of Tankiz or by various princes, judges and wealthy merchants.

Between 1318-19 he commissioned a restoration of the Dome of the Rock in Jerusalem. In 1328 he ordered the Umayyad Mosque in Damascus and the al-Aqsa Mosque in Jerusalem to be renovated. The latter project was completed in 1331. A few months after, in 1332, Tankiz had the mihrab of the Ibrahimi Mosque in Hebron restored. Glass mosaics that previously existed in those structures (most dated from the Umayyad period) and had since worn down were given specific attention by Tankiz. Additionally, new mosaic decorations were added to the prayer niches of the mosques. Most surviving examples of glass mosaics from the Mamluk era could be traced back to Tankiz's architectural activities.

In 1328-1330, Tankiz endowed a charitable foundation, madrasa (the Tankiziyya), and women's hospice (the Ribat an-Nisā’) in Jerusalem, near the Chain Gate. In 1336 or 1337, He also gave the endowment that built the Cotton Merchants' Market, and surrounding buildings like Cotton Merchants' Gate, the Khān Tankiz (a khān, or inn), Ḥammam al-ʿAyn and Ḥammam al-Shifa (two hammams, or bathhouses).

In honor of his wife (Khawand Sutayta bint Kawkabay al-Mansuri), Tankiz built a twin-domed mausoleum for her in Damascus called al-Turba al-Kawkabʾiyya, which was completed five months after her death in 1330. As a fulfillment of her will, a mosque and a women's hospice were added alongside her tomb.

== Family ==
Tankiz was married to a Khawand Sutayta bint Sayf al-Din Kawkabay al-Mansuri. She died in Tankiz's Damascus home in mid-1330 and five months later a domed mausoleum was built over her tomb by Tankiz. Khawand Sutayta had also ordered that a mosque and women's hospice be constructed adjacent to her mausoleum. The closeness between Tankiz and an-Nasir Muhammad was highlighted between the intermarriage of their offspring. Tankiz arranged the marriage of his daughter Qutlughmalik to an-Nasir Muhammad. In 1338, Qutlughmalik gave birth to as-Salih Salih, who later became sultan in 1342–1345. Also in 1338, two of Tankiz's sons married two of an-Nasir Muhammad's daughters from another of the latter's wives. Of Tankiz's sons, Ali was granted an emirate in 1331 and Muhammad and Ahmad became emirs, during Tankiz's rule and with an-Nasir Muhammad's blessing. A grandson of Tankiz, Salah al-Din Muhammad ibn Muhmmad, was an amir tabalkhanah and a member of the sultanic khassakiya, and his son Nasir al-Din Muhammad (d. 1399) was also likely an emir.

== Bibliography ==
- Conermann, Stephan (2008). "Tankiz ibn ʿAbd Allāh al-Ḥusāmī al-Nāṣirī (d. 740/1340) as Seen by His Contemporary al-Ṣafadī (d. 764/1363)" (PDF). Mamluk Studies Review. 12 (2). Middle East Documentation Center, University of Chicago: 1–24.
- Flood, F. B. (1997). Necipoğlu, Gülru (ed.). "Umayyad Survivals and Mamluk Revivals: Qalawunid Architecture and the Great Mosque of Damascus" (PDF). Muqarnas. 14. Brill: 57–79. doi:10.2307/1523236. ISBN 9004108726. JSTOR 1523236.
- Jarrar, Sabri (1998). Necipoğlu, Gülru (ed.). "Suq al-Maʿrifa: An Ayyubid Hanbalite Shrine in al-Haram al-Sharif" (PDF). Muqarnas. 15. Brill: 71–100. doi:10.2307/1523278. JSTOR 1523278.
- Kenney, Ellen V. (2009). Power and Patronage in Medieval Syria: The Architecture and Urban Works of Tankiz Al-Nāṣirī. Oxford University Press. ISBN 978-0970819949.
- Lapidus, Ira M. (1984). Muslim Cities in the Later Middle Ages. CUP Archive. ISBN 0521277620.
- Levanoni, Amalia (1995). A Turning Point in Mamluk History: The Third Reign of Al-Nasir Muuammad Ibn Qalawun (1310-1341). BRILL. ISBN 9004101829.
- Little, Donald P. (1976). Essays on Islamic Civilization: Presented to Niyazi Berkes. BRILL Archive. ISBN 9004044647.
- Mazor, Amir (2014). "The "Manṣūrīyah Legacy": The Manṣūrī Amirs, Their Mamluks, and Their Descendants during al-Nāṣir Muḥammad's Third Reign and After". Mamluk Studies Review. 18: 1–56.
- Sharon, Moshe (2009). Corpus Inscriptionum Arabicarum Palaestinae, Volume Four: -G-. Brill. ISBN 9789047424161.
- Steenbergen, Jo Van (2001). "The Amir Qawsun: Statesman or Courtier? (720-741 AH/1320-1341 AD)". In Vermeulen, Urbain; Steenbergen, Jo Van (eds.). Egypt and Syria in the Fatimid, Ayyubid, and Mamluk Eras III. Peeters Publishers. ISBN 9789042909700.
- William, Harris (2012). Lebanon: A History, 600-2011. Oxford University Press. ISBN 978-0195181111.
- Williams, Caroline (1994). "The Mosque of Sitt Hadaq". In Necipoğlu, Gülru (ed.). Muqarnas: An Annual on Islamic Art and Architecture, Volume 11. BRILL. ISBN 9004100709.
