= Tankiziyya =

Islamic school in Al-Aqsa, Jerusalem

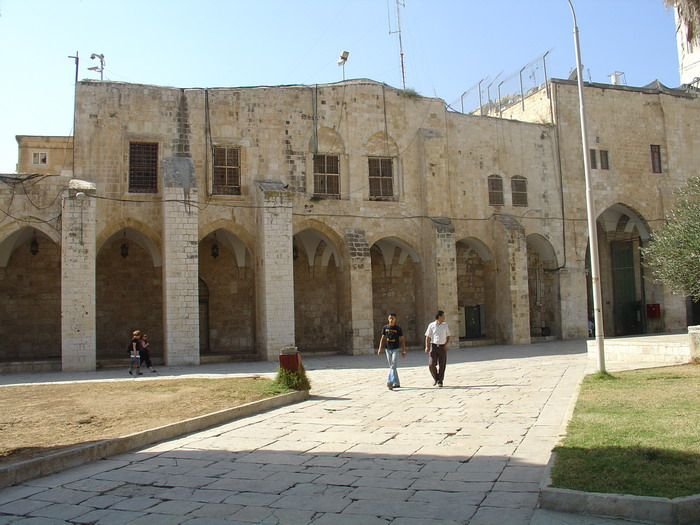
The school, as seen from inside the al-Aqsa Compound

The at-Tankiziyya (Arabic: التنكزية, romanized: al-Tankiziyya, lit. 'the place of Tankiz') (Note: The name al-Tankiziyya is also transliterated at-Tankiziyya, because the article al- assimilates to at- before t, a sun letter.) is a historic building in Jerusalem that included a madrasa. (Note: المدرسة التنكزية, Madrasa at-Tankiziyya.) It is part of the west wall of the al-Aqsa Compound. It is also known as the Maḥkama building.

== History ==
=== Mamluk period ===
The building was created in 1328–1330, funded through a waqf (charitable endowment) by Tankiz, a Baḥrite Mamlūk viceroy and emir. And the name Tankiziyya commemorates him (Tankiz with the nisba suffix). The endowment also included revenues from several urban businesses and Palestinian villages, such as Ayn Qinya.

The Tankiziyya served three main purposes: a madrasa, a school for the muḥaddithūn (experts in hadith), and a home for a community of Sufis. There were a set of rules regulating when and where each of the three separate groups would meet for daily recitations of the Qur'an and prayers for Tankiz, his descendants and the ruling sultan. The building also included a library, a khanqah and a school for orphans.

=== Late Ottoman & Mandate periods ===
It became the Mahkamah (Mahkameh, Mehkemeh; المحكمة, al-Maḥkama / Maḥkame, 'law court'), because it housed a sharia court (al-maḥkama al-sharʿiyya) from the 19th century to the early years of the British Mandate (in the early 20th century). It later housed the president of the Supreme Muslim Council.

=== Israeli period ===
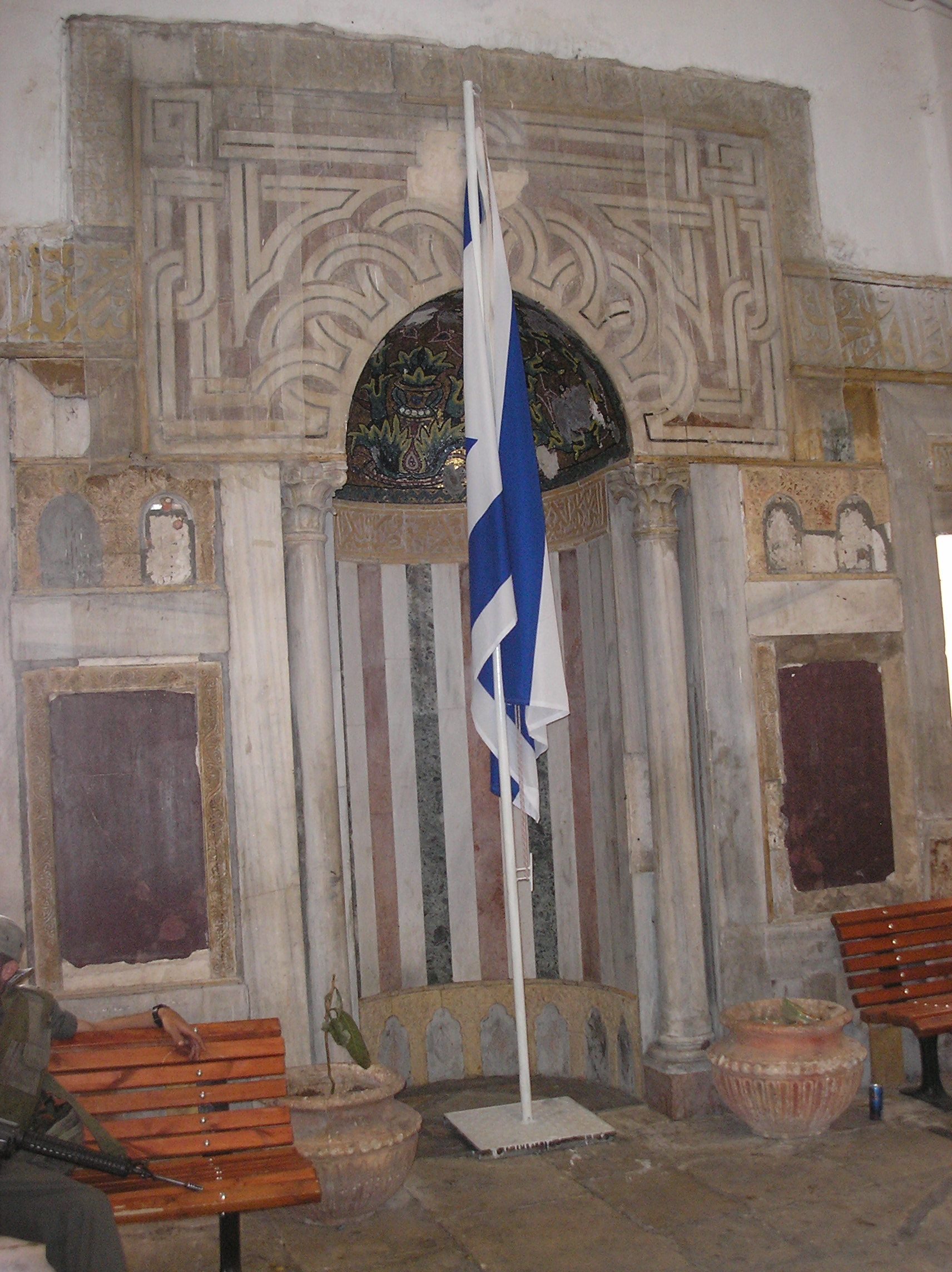
The former mihrab of the madrasa, with Umayyad-style mosaics from the Mamluk-era

It has been taken over by the Israel Border Police as a police station. Inside, the Israelis have created a Jewish prayer room, which is "sometimes called the 'synagogue inside the Haram'", according to an International Crisis Group report. Structural alterations have been made, as there have been an increasing number of people and prayers there.

== Architecture ==
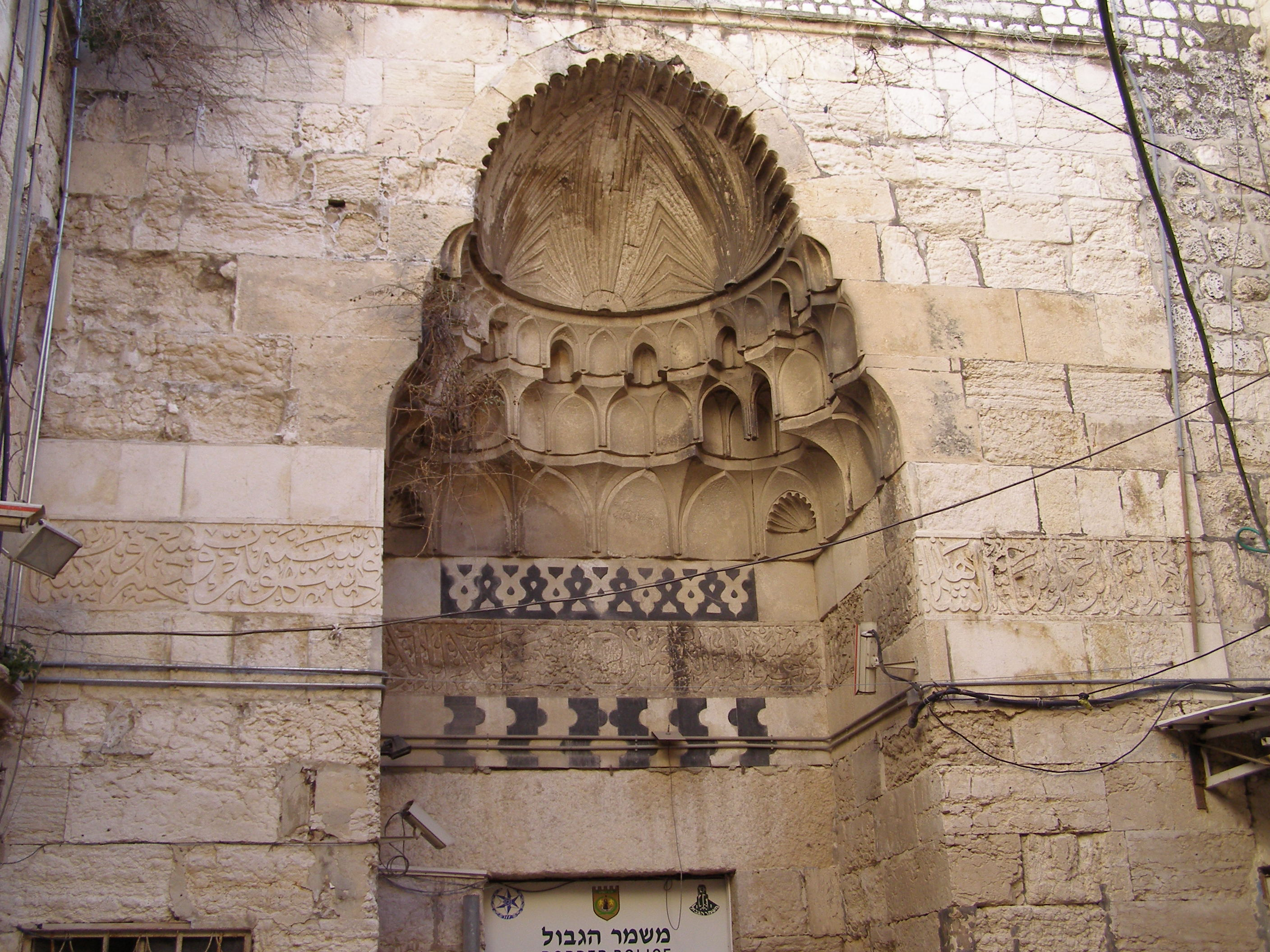
Its elaborate portal

It is the best example of a cruciform madrasa in Jerusalem; its four halls unite in a central area where a marble fountain stands. The entirety of the building "exudes harmony", notes historian Max van Berchem.

Its entrance is set inside a tall portal, considered "one of the finest niche-headed doorways in Jerusalem". Its elements are a combination of geometric precision and free-hand irregularity. The top of the recess is a niche-like semi-dome covered with radiating flutes that merge into chevrons. The flute carving "is so delicate as to necessitate very fine joints between the voussoirs, and these have been most carefully set out". The lower part of the semi-dome has three courses (rows) of muqarnas; the lowest course features two shell ornaments "to give interest to the re-entering angles".

Above the lintel is an inscription between two bands of black-and-white ablaq. The inscription includes Tankiz's mamluk emblem (a cup), his name and the year 729 AH (overlapping partly with 1328 and 1329 CE).

The architectural concept of the "hanging madrasa" – having part or all of the interior be built atop a portico or a series of arches – was first applied for this madrasa.

== Environs ==
Its eastern façade is inside the western esplanade of the al-Aqsa Compound, where it overlooks the Dome of Moses.

Its northeast corner is next to the Chain Gate. Its entrance faces north, where there is a small plaza with a sebil called the Chain Gate Sebil.

The plaza north of the Tankiziyya also includes the Turba as-Saʿdiyya (a tomb) and the Ribāṭ an-Nisā’ (a woman's hospice, or ribāṭ). The ribat, which was founded by Tankiz in the same year, can also considered to be part of the Tankiziyya complex, even though it is separate from the madrasa building.

West of the Tankiziyya's north entrance are four small shops that belonged to the Tankiziyya. They were among the businesses that generated revenues to support the Tankiziyya.

Cotton Merchants' Market and Khān Tankiz on the next street to the north were founded by Tankiz c. 1336.

== Bibliography ==
- Berchem, van, M. (1922). MIFAO 43 Matériaux pour un Corpus Inscriptionum Arabicarum Part 2 Syrie du Sud T.1 Jérusalem "Ville" (in French and Arabic). Cairo: Impr. de l'Institut français d'archéologie orientale. (pp. 252−261)
- Burgoyne, Michael Hamilton (1987). Mamluk Jerusalem. British School of Archaeology in Jerusalem by the World of Islam Festival Trust. ISBN 090503533X. (pp. 223−239)
- Hawari, M.; Yusuf Natsheh; Nazmi Al-Ju'beh (2013). Pilgrimage, Sciences and Sufism: Islamic Art in the West Bank and Gaza. Museum With No Frontiers, MWNF. ISBN 978-3902782113. (pp. 123–125)
- Harvey, William (1912). "Jerusalem drawings". Architectural Review. 22: 201–206.
- Hütteroth, W.-D.; Abdulfattah, K. (1977). Historical Geography of Palestine, Transjordan and Southern Syria in the Late 16th Century. Erlanger Geographische Arbeiten, Sonderband 5. Erlangen, Germany: Vorstand der Fränkischen Geographischen Gesellschaft. ISBN 3-920405-41-2.
- Mayer, L.A. (1933). Saracenic Heraldry: A Survey. Oxford: Oxford University Press. (Mayer, 1933, pp. 218−223)
- Moudjir ed-dyn (1876). Sauvaire (ed.). Histoire de Jérusalem et d'Hébron depuis Abraham jusqu'à la fin du XVe siècle de J.-C. : fragments de la Chronique de Moudjir-ed-dyn. (Moudjir ed-dyn, 1876, p. 142)

=== External links ===
- Al-Tankiziyya, archnet
