= Tyropoeon Valley =

Valley in Jerusalem

Coordinates: 31°46′37.01″N 35°14′3.26″E

1862 map of Jerusalem showing the Valley of Tyropoeon

Tyropoeon Valley (Greek: φάραγξ τῶν τυροποιῶν pharanx tōn tyropoiōn i.e., "Valley of the Cheesemakers" or "Cheesemongers") is the name given by the first-century Jewish-Roman historian Josephus (Wars 5.140) to the valley or rugged ravine, which in his times separated Jerusalem's Temple Mount (Mount Moriah) from the Western Hill or Mount Zion, and emptied into the valley of Hinnom. In modern scholarly terms it is also known as the central valley/Central Valley of Jerusalem.

== Names, etymology ==
In the ancient Copper Scroll this valley is called in Hebrew the Outer Valley (3Q15 col.8, line 4).

The name used by Josephus, των τυροποιων (tōn tyropoiōn), possibly arose as an ancient mistranslation from Hebrew to the Greek of Josephus's book; Semitic languages use the same root for outer and congeal.

== Description, history ==
The Tyropoeon, filled over the centuries with a vast accumulation of debris, and almost a plain, was spanned by bridges, the most noted of which was Zion Bridge, which was probably the ordinary means of communication between the royal palace on Zion and the temple.

The Western Wall of the Temple Mount rose up from the bottom of this valley to the height of 84 feet, where it was on a level with the area, and above this, and as a continuance of it, the wall of Solomon's cloister rose to the height of about 50 feet, "so that this section of the wall would originally present to view a stupendous mass of masonry scarcely to be surpassed by any mural masonry in the world."

== See also ==
- Geography of Israel
