= Dome of Yusuf =

Islamic building in Al-Aqsa, Jerusalem

Coordinates: 31°46′38.60″N 35°14′07.17″E

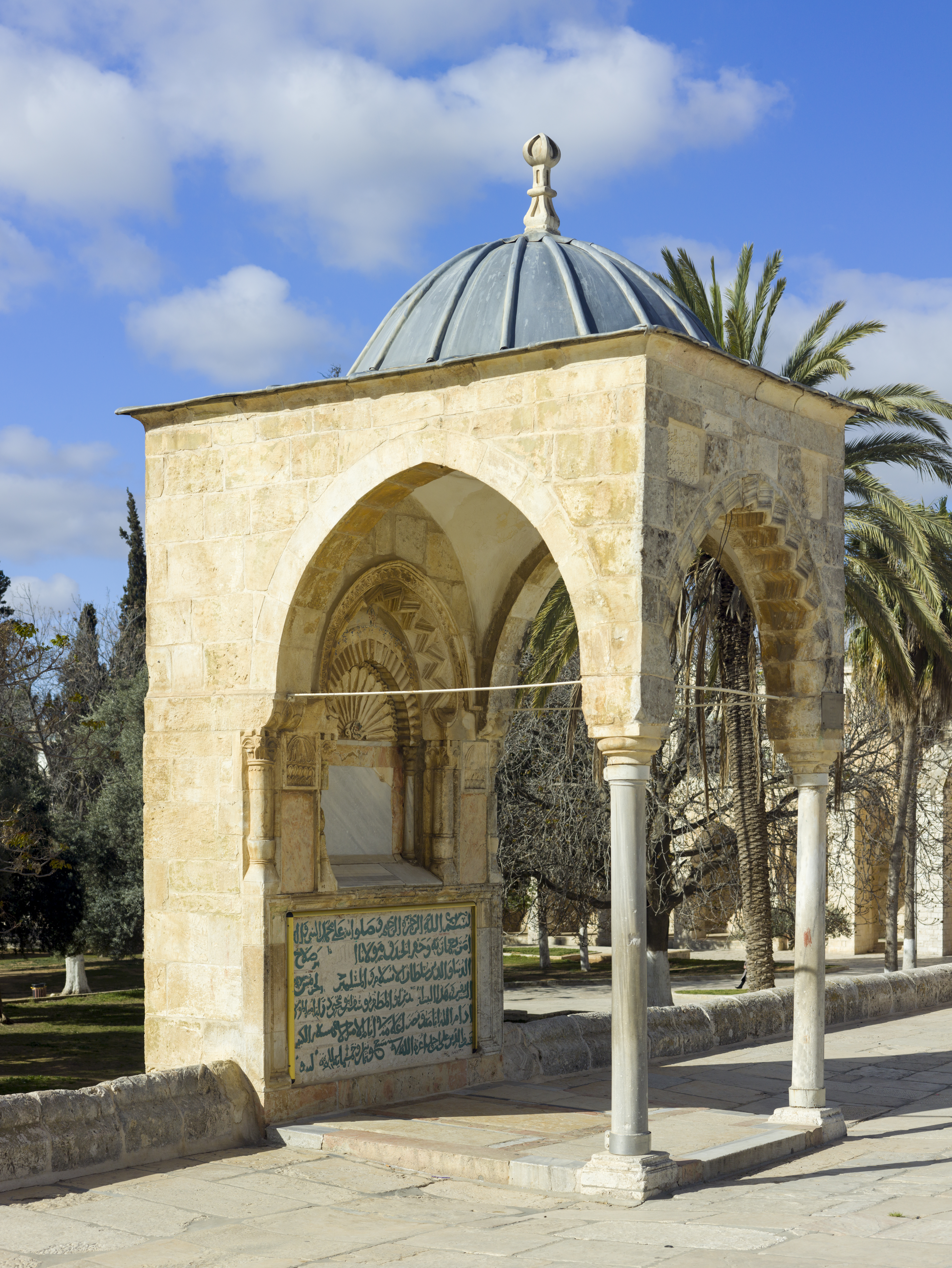
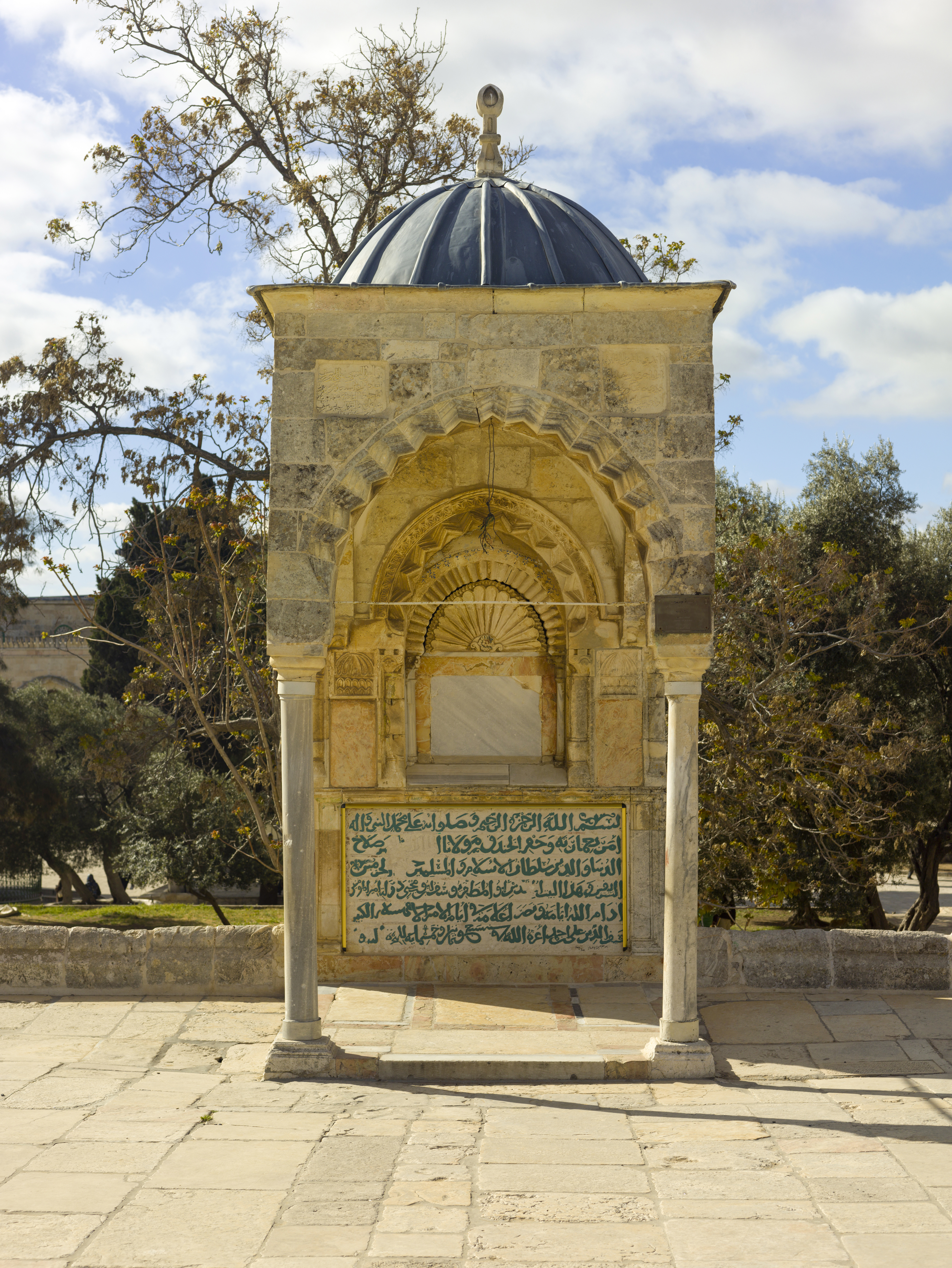
The Dome of Yusuf – honoring Saladin, a 12th-century sultan – is on the Temple Mount in the Old City of Jerusalem.

The Dome of Yusuf (Arabic: قبة يوسف Qubbat Yūsuf) is a free-standing domed structure on the Temple Mount, located south of the Dome of the Rock.

It was built by Saladin (born Yusuf) in the 12th century, and has been renovated several times. It bears inscriptions from the 12th and 17th centuries: one dated 1191 in Saladin's name, and two mentioning Yusuf Agha, possibly a governor of Jerusalem or a eunuch in the Ottoman imperial palace.

== Description ==
A rectangular semi-enclosed structure resembling an aedicule, the Dome of Yusuf sits upon a solid stone wall and is supported by three pointed open arches. On the northern face of the southern wall, there are stone carvings and a marble-faced blind niche. The exterior of the dome is covered in lead sheeting, and the interior is decorated with a ribbed pattern.

The structure has three inscriptions:

- The prominent inscription on the lower panel, a green naskh Arabic text, is from 1191 (during the Ayyubid dynasty). It calls Saladin by his kunya Abū’l-Muẓaffar ("father of the Triumphant") and his personal name Yūsuf. (Note: Saladin's name ʾAbū al-Muẓaffar Yūsuf ibn Ayyūb (أبو المظفر يوسف بن أيوب) is in the fourth line, starting in the middle.) It also mentions an emir, al-Asfahasalar Sayf ad-Din Ali bin Ahmad (al-Asfahsalar Ali bin Ahmad al-Hikkari), for having supervised the construction of a defensive trench.
- Two small, unpainted inscriptions are on the façade's spandrels (above the arch). They are in two different languages, together forming a bilingual epigraphic text. Both panels end with "1092" in Eastern Arabic numerals (١٠٩٢), which is the Hijri year that overlaps partly with 1682 CE.
  - The right one is in Ottoman Turkish, stating that Superintendent Ali Agha built this. (Note: The right (west) inscription: "The superintendent Ali Agha has built this – that the reward should all fall on Yusuf Agha. On seeing it, the Oracle Hatif pronounced its date: Muharram of the year 1092 (AH)."; Inscribed Ottoman Turkish text: یابدی ناظر علی اغا بونی اوله اجرى يوسف اغايه تمام دیدی حاتف كورنجه تأريخن اولدی بيك طقسان ایکی ده اتمام محرم سنة ١٠٩٢: Transliteration: Yapdı Nazır Ali Ağa bunu / Ol ecri Yusuf Ağayı tamam / Dedi Hatif Kurnaci tarihin / Oldu bin doksanikide tamam / Muharrem sene 1092.)
  - The left is in Arabic, with mostly the same information. It indicates that Ali did it on behalf of Yusuf Agha. Both panels clarify that the reward for this effort should go to Yusuf. (Note: The left (east) inscription: "This [dome] has been built out of piety on behalf of Yusuf, / the agha of the Abode of Supreme Felicity [Istanbul], through his perfect piety. / We are presented with it in the phrasing (chronogram) regarding its construction. / Ali has built it [the dome], but the reward for it returns to Yusuf. / Muharram of the year 1092 (AH)."; Inscribed Arabic text: بناه على التقوى على ليوسف اغا دار اوج السعد من بره وفي لنا جاء في التأريخ عند بنائه بناه على والثواب ليوسف محرم سنة ١٠٩٢)

The white central panel inside the niche is blank.

== Environs ==
It is one of several structures jutting out of the southern end of the raised platform (terrace) of the Dome of the Rock. The Dome of Yusuf is between the Summer Pulpit (Minbar of Burhān ad-Dīn) and the an-Naḥawiyya Dome (Grammarians' Dome). To their east, one sees the main southern colonnade (mawāzīn).

The less-ornamental Dome of Yusuf Agha is a separate building, located in a plaza in the south of the compound.

== See also ==
- High medieval domes
