= Islamic Museum, Jerusalem =

Museum in Al-Aqsa, Jerusalem

Islamic Museum
- متحف الآثار الإسلامية
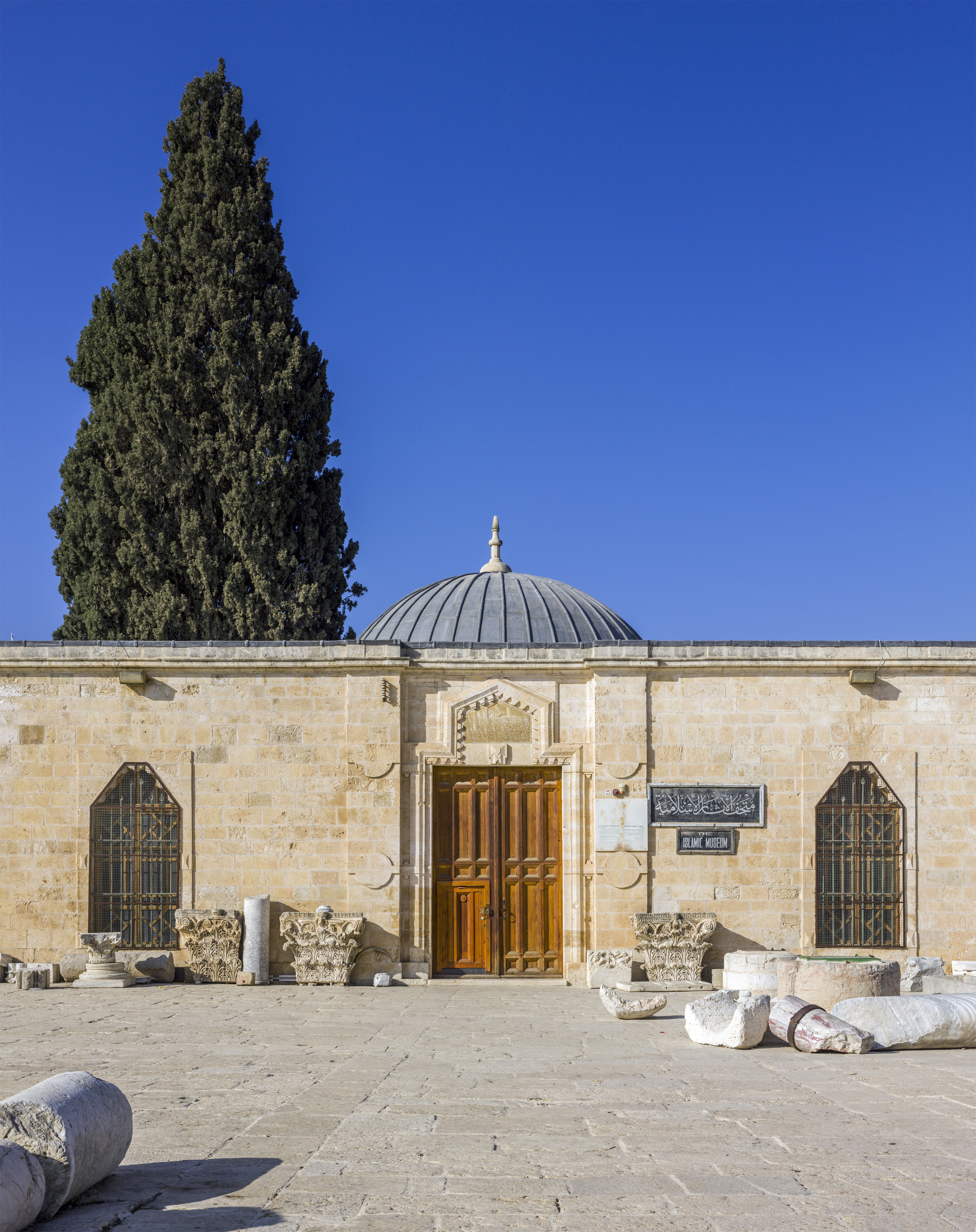
- Established: 1923
- Location: Al-Aqsa, Jerusalem
- Coordinates: 31°46′33.87″N 35°14′05.32″E
- Type: museum

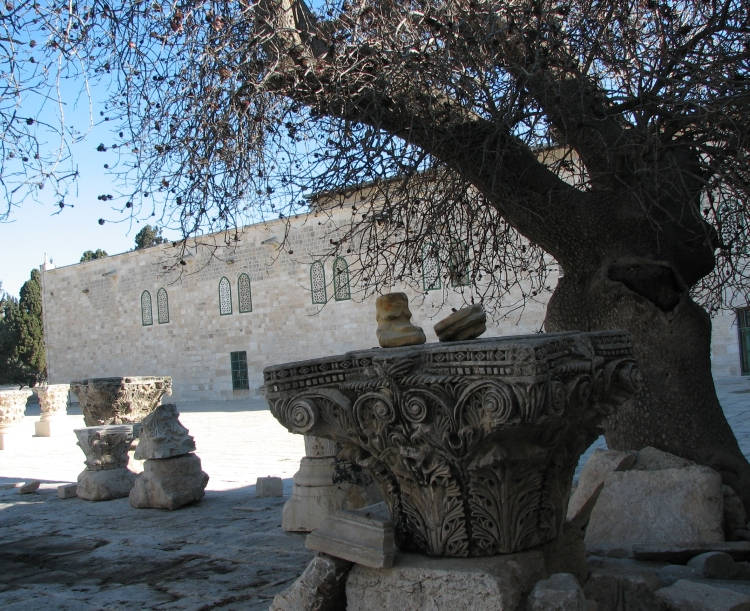
The museum courtyard, with capitals. Al-Aqsa Mosque is in the back.

The Islamic Museum (Arabic: متحف الآثار الإسلامية, romanized: Matḥaf al-Āthār al-Islāmīyah; Hebrew: מוזיאון האסלאם) is a museum at Al Aqsa in the Old City section of Jerusalem. On display are exhibits from ten periods of Islamic history encompassing several Muslim regions. The museum is west of al-Aqsa Mosque, across a courtyard.

== History ==
The building was originally constructed by the Knights Templar, who used it as an annex to their headquarters established at the former Al-Aqsa Mosque. Following the Muslim reconquest of Jerusalem, the mosque was restored in 1194 CE.

The annex building served an assembly hall for the Fakhr al-Din Mohammad School (al-Fakhriya), a madrasa built by al-Mansur Qalawun in 1282 CE, during the Mamluk era. Most of the other buildings of the al-Fakhriya madrasa complex – considered part of the al-Aqsa Mosque – were demolished by the Israeli Army in 1969.

The building also housed the Mosque of the Maghrebis (Jāmiʿ al-Maghāribah, جامع المغاربة), also known as the "Mosque of the Malikis", as most Maghrebi scholars follow the Maliki school of jurisprudence. The Maghrebi mosque bordered the now-vanished Maghrebi Quarter, a neighborhood that was completely razed by the Israelis in 1967.

The museum was established by the Supreme Muslim Council in 1923. Shadia Yousef Touqan was the head planner of the site. By 1927, the Mosque of the Maghrebis was converted into the Islamic Museum.

Khader Salameh was a notable head curator of the museum.

== Exhibits ==
The Islamic Museum displays large copper soup kettles used in the Haseki Sultan Imaret, a soup kitchen, built through a donation by Hürrem Sultan, the wife of Suleiman the Magnificent, dating back to the 16th century, as well as stained glass windows, wooden panels, ceramic tiles and iron doors from the reign of Suleiman the Magnificent. Also on display are a cannon used to announce the breaking of Ramadan, a large collection of weapons, a large wax tree trunk, the charred remains of the Minbar of Saladin (built by Nur ad-Din Zangi in the 1170s and destroyed in an arson attack in 1969), and the blood-stained clothing of 17 Palestinians killed in the rioting on the Temple Mount in 1990.

=== Qur'an manuscripts ===
The museum has 600 copies of the Qur'an donated to the al-Aqsa Mosque during the Umayyad, Abbasid, Fatimid, Ayyubid, Mamluk, Ottoman eras by caliphs, sultans, emirs, ulama and private individuals. Each differ in size, calligraphy and ornamentation. One is a hand-written Qur'an whose transcription is attributed to the great-great-grandson of Muhammad. Another is written in Kufic script, dating back to the 8th-9th century. A 30-part Moroccan rabʿah (multi-volume manuscript) was bequeathed in 1344 by Sultan Abu al-Hasan al-Marini of Morocco; it is the only manuscript remaining from three collections that the sultan dispatched to the mosques of the three holy cities in Islam — Mecca, Medina and Jerusalem. In addition, there is a very large Qur'an, measuring 100 by 90 centimetres (3.3 ft × 3.0 ft), dating back to the 14th century.

== Environs ==
It is in the same southwestern corner of the compound as the al-Fakhariyya Minaret. To the north of the museum, there is Moors' Gate (Maghrebi Gate / Morocco Gate). The southern part of the museum is right next to the al-Aqsa Library.

The small courtyard east of the museum has the Dome of Yusuf Agha and many column capitals. Farther east, on the other side of the courtyard, is al-Aqsa Mosque's western side.

== See also ==
- Museum of Islamic Art, Cairo (Egypt)
