= Dome of Yusuf Agha =

Islamic building in al-Aqsa, Jerusalem

Coordinates: 31°46′34.644″N 35°14′6.324″E

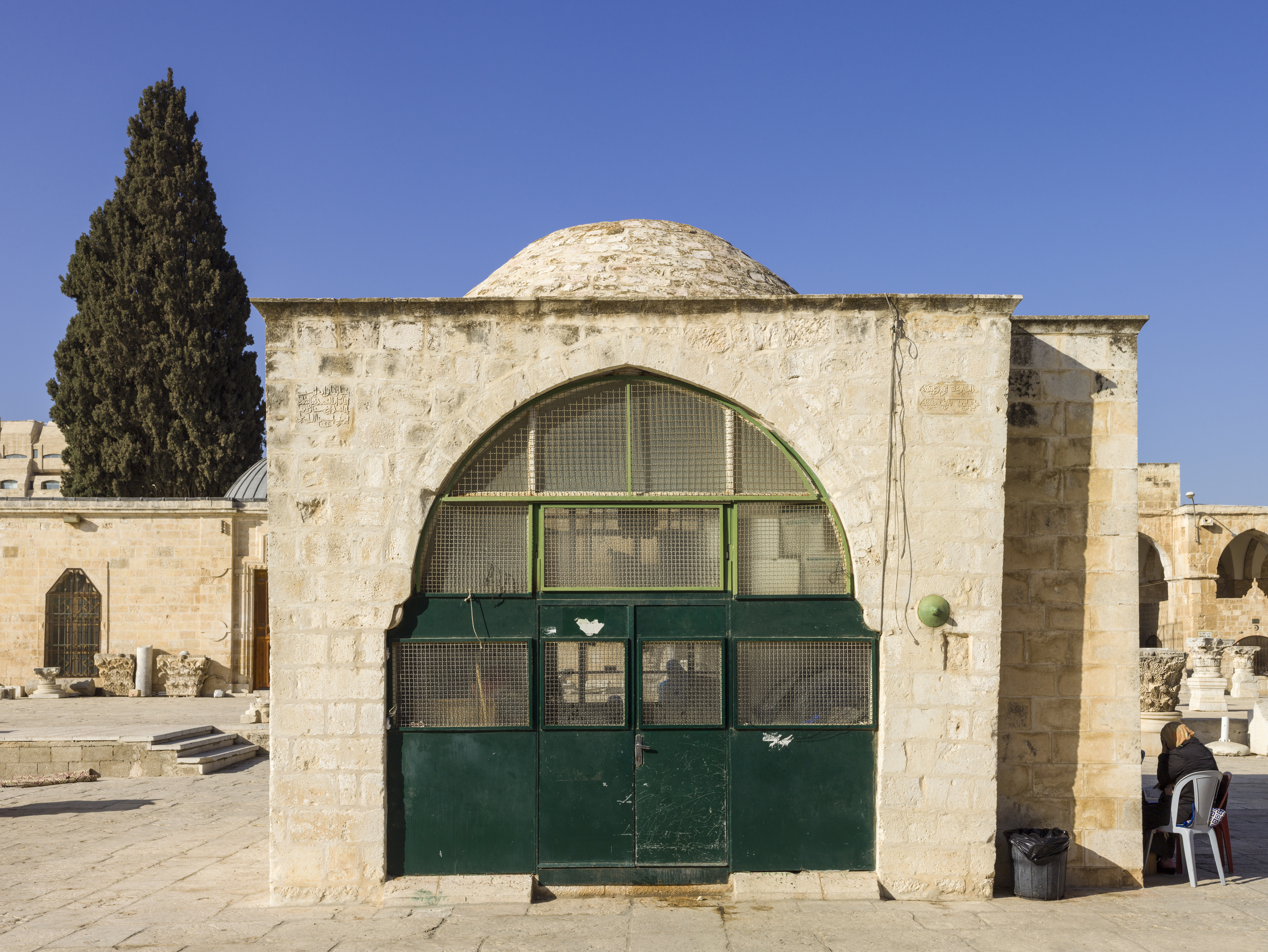
The Dome of Yusuf Agha in a plaza in the al-Aqsa Compound

The Dome of Yusuf Agha (Arabic: قبة يوسف أغا Qubbat Yūsuf Agha) is a small square building with a dome in the al-Aqsa Compound (al-Ḥaram ash-Sharīf), in the courtyard between the Islamic Museum and al-Aqsa Mosque (al-Qibli).

== History ==
It was built in 1681 and commemorates Yusuf Agha. He also endowed the Dome of Yusuf, a smaller and more intricate-looking structure about 120 metres (390 ft) to the north.

It was converted in the 1970s into a ticket office and an information kiosk for visitors.

== Environs ==
It is in the middle of an open-air courtyard that stores detached column capitals. To its south is the al-Aqsa Library.

To its west are the Islamic Museum and the Moors' Gate (Morocco Gate). There's another domed building to its northwest: the Sabīl Bāb al-Maghāriba (the sebil of the Moors' Gate).

To its southwest is the al-Fakhariyya Minaret. To its north is a mihrab with a small window in it, the mihrab of the Pine Platform (مصطبة الصنوبر) (Maṣṭabat aṣ-Ṣanawbar).
