= Al-Khatuniyya Madrasa =

Al-Khatuniyya Madrasa can refer to:

- Al-Khatuniyya Madrasa (Jerusalem)
- Al-Khatuniyya Madrasa (Damascus)
- Al-Khatuniyya Madrasa (Tripoli, Lebanon)
- Hatuniye Madrasa, Karaman
