= Uthmaniyya Madrasa =

The Uthmaniyya Madrasa (al-Madrasa l-ʿUṯmāniyya) may refer to:

- Al-Uthmaniyya Madrasa (Jerusalem)
- Uthmaniyya Madrasa (Aleppo)
