= Cotton Merchants' Gate =

Gateway to Al-Aqsa, Jerusalem

Coordinates: 31.77798°N 35.23420°E

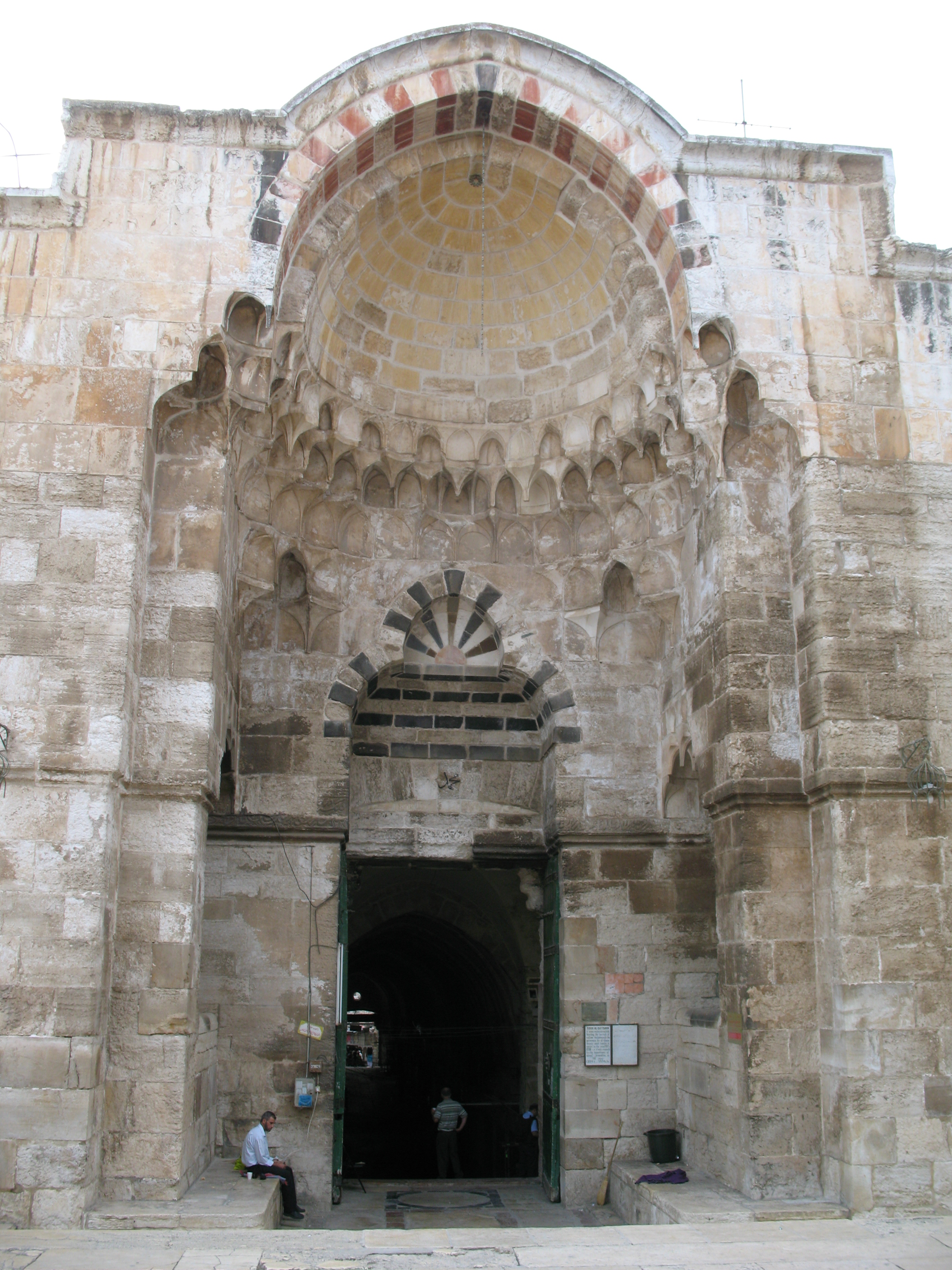
The gate from the east (inside the enclosure)

The Cotton Merchants' Gate (Arabic: باب القطانين Bāb al-Qaṭṭānīn) is one of the gates of the al-Aqsa Compound (al-Ḥaram ash-Sharīf). It is by the western esplanade of the compound and leads to the Cotton Merchants' Market, a sūq. It is also called the Gate of the Cotton Merchants' Market (وباب سوق القطانين Bāb Sūq al-Qaṭṭānīn). Its intricate eastern façade makes it one of the most recognizable and "grandest of the Haram gates".

== History ==
It was built under the supervision of Tankiz in 1336, during the time of Sultan an-Nasir Muhammad of the Mamluk Sultanate. The 14th-century historian al-ʿUmarī explained that the gate was constructed to link the compound with the sūq's market street, which was also built by Tankiz around that time: in 1336-37.

== Description ==
There are ten descending steps to reach the gate.

Its eastern façade faces the inside of the compound and features a recess with a semi-dome. The semi-dome has a gently pointed arch, and its voussoir has ablaq (alternating) masonry of red and beige bricks. It also contains five rows of muqarnas.

Between the semi-dome and the door is a trefoil-shaped arch, with ablaq patterns in black and beige bricks. Above the door is a straight stone lintel composed of three external pieces. There used to be a small window in the trefoil arch's tympanum, but the window was blocked in 1927.

== Environs ==
The Ablution Gate is nearby and to the south. These are the closest gates to the Dome of the Rock, with the Fountain of Qaytbay near the gates.

Immediately north of the gate is the Khātūniyya Madrasa, and even farther north is the Arghūniyya Madrasa. North of the madrasas is the Iron Gate.

== See also ==
- Gates of the Temple Mount or of the Haram
