= Fountain of Qasim Pasha =

Islamic structure in Al-Aqsa, Jerusalem

Coordinates: 31°46′38.39″N 35°14′04.99″E

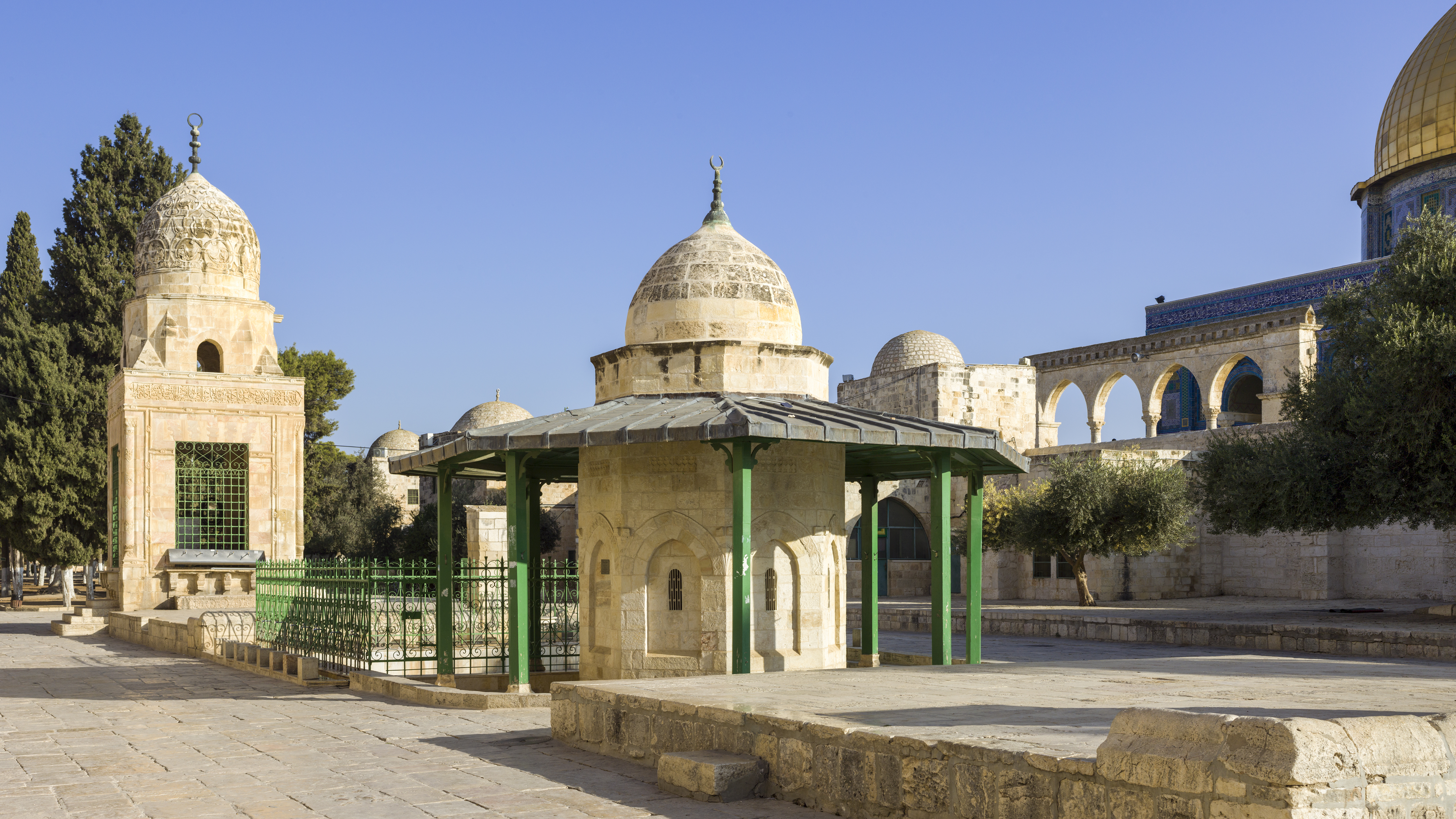
Fountain of Qasim Pasha (background: the Fountain of Qaitbay)

The Fountain of Qasim Pasha (Arabic: سبيل قاسم باشا, romanized: Sabīl Qāsim Bāšā) is an ablution and drinking fountain (sebil or sabil) in the western esplanade of the al-Aqsa Compound in the Old City of Jerusalem. It is in front of the Chain Gate.

It was also known as the Sabil an-Nāranj ("Sebil of the Bitter Orange") and Sabīl Bāb al-Maḥkama ("Sebil of the Court House Gate", from another name of the Chain Gate, referring to a former court in the Tankiziyya).

== History ==
The construction of the fountain was started in 1526 and completed within a year by Qasim Pasha (Güzelce Kasım Paşa), the Ottoman governor of the Eyalet of Egypt (wali of Egypt) during the reign of Suleiman the Magnificent. It was the first public Ottoman building on the Haram al-Sharif (al-Aqsa Compound). In addition, it is believed that the fact that the first monument built was an ablution house may be related to the fact that the Ottoman state, mostly Hanafis, perform wudu in running water rather than still water. Earlier Ottoman works on the site were not the construction of newer buildings, but the restoration of Walls of Jerusalem. Suleiman's projects elsewhere in Jerusalem include the Masjid an-Nabi Dawud and Qanat as-Sabil.

A wooden colonnade was added to protect the benches and steps from rain and the summer sun in the 1920s restoration by the Supreme Muslim Council. Its dome was rebuilt during the restoration, and covered with lead panels that gave it a pointed and shallower profile. In 1998, the lead sheeting was replaced by a finely crafted stone.

Like other sabils, it was to supply fresh water to the public for drinking and ablution. There are accounts that the sabil was in use until the late 1940s. It originally got its water supply from a water channel, but today it is supplied with water from al-Aqsa's water system.

== Architecture ==
It is an octagonal building consisting of 1.43-metre-long sides, topped by a dome. The structure has marble paving and a modern fountain in its centre. Around the sabil, there is a wooden canopy covered with lead which protects worshipers from the sun and rain. It is mounted by green pillars and descending into it by four steps to perform ablution and drinking. It has 16 faucets and several stone benches. The dome of the structure is built atop an octagonal drum.

It is unique in its design and differs from other Jerusalem and al-Aqsa Mosque sabils.

== Environs ==
The fountain is located in the southwest of the Al-Aqsa Compound, near Bab al-Silsila and opposite the Al-Ashrafiyya Madrasa.

To its north is Sabil Qaitbay, another fountain. In between the two fountains, there is a fenced-off shallow square pool called the an-Nāranj Pool.

To its south is the Dome of Moses. In between them, there is a maṣṭaba (platform), called Maṣṭabat at-Tīn ('of the Fig') (مصطبة التين) or Maṣṭabat aṭ-Ṭīn ('of Mud') (مصطبة الطين). The mastaba has a mihrab.

== Inscription ==
There is an Arabic inscription on the monument dedicated to Suleiman the Magnificent:

"This blessed sabil has been constructed for the benefit and countenance of extolled Allah, in the days of our master, the greatest sultan, the second Solomon, the ruler of the World, son of Sultan Selim Khan, sultan of Arab and Persian (non-Arab) lands; by our master, Kasım Pasha, may Allah facilitate what he has intended; by the hands of the slave who is in need of Allah, Abdarrabbihi Mustafa, in the year of 933 at the end of the month of Shaʿban."

The inscription is dated Shaʿban 933 AH (1527 CE). In it, Suleiman is given the honorific "the second Solomon" (سليمان الثانى Sulaymān al-thānī), as they were deemed comparable in achievements related to Jerusalem. A later inscription (1531) on the Citadel's entrance gate also refers to him as "the second Solomon".
