= Al-Uthmaniyya Madrasa (Jerusalem) =

Islamic school in Al-Aqsa, Jerusalem

Al-ʿUthmaniyya
- العثمانية
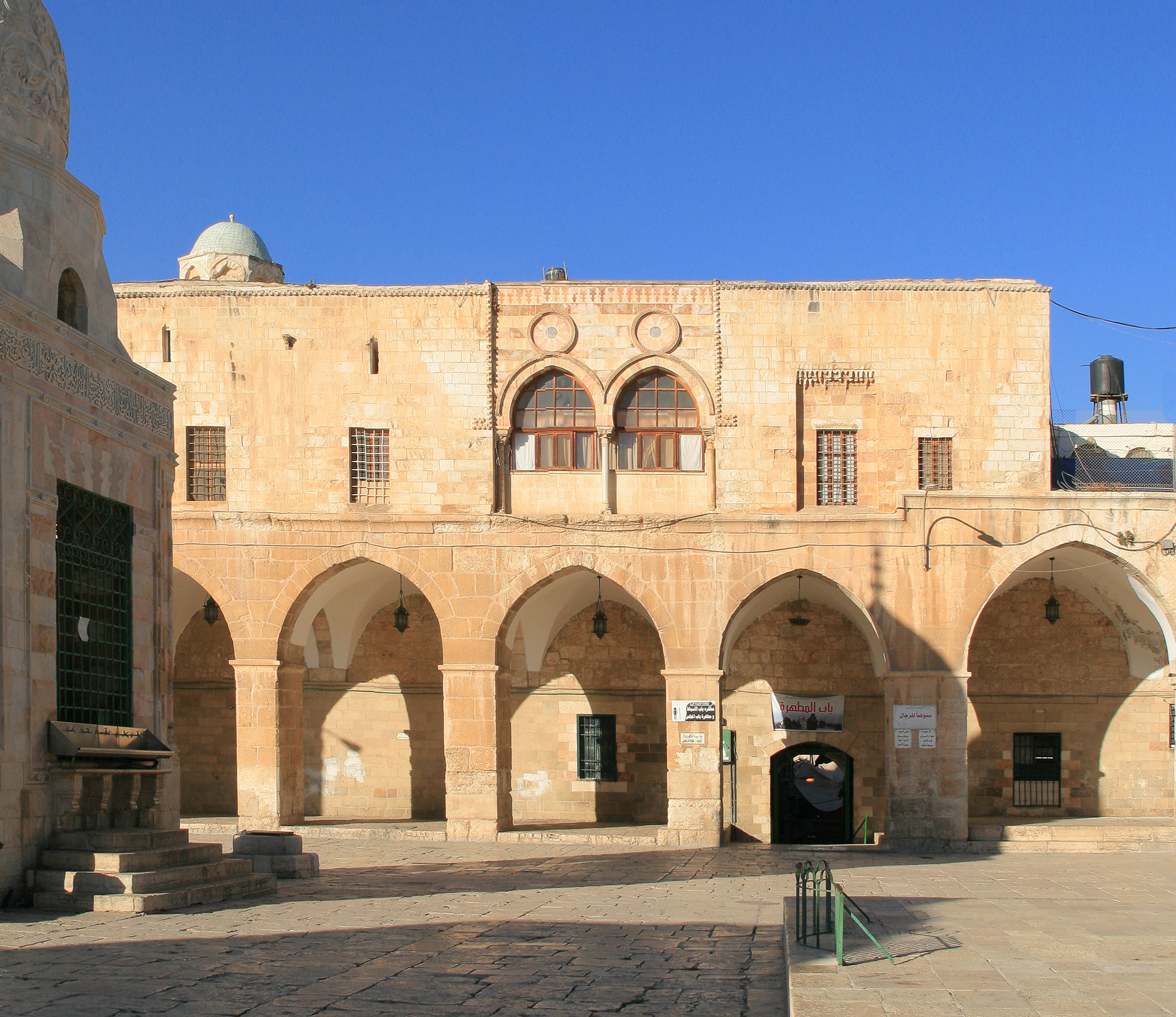
- ʿUthmaniyya, seen from the Haram esh-Sharif, with the double-arched loggia on the top floor

Religion
- Affiliation: Islam

Location
- Location: Haram esh-Sharif, Jerusalem
- Interactive map of Al-ʿUthmaniyya
- Palestine grid: 172/131
- Coordinates: 31°46′39″N 35°14′04″E

Architecture
- Type: Madrasa
- Style: Mamluk architecture
- Completed: 1437
- Materials: stone

The ʿUthmāniyya Madrasa (Arabic: المدرسة العثمانية al-Madrasa al-ʿUthmāniyya) is a historic school in Jerusalem. It is by the western esplanade of the al-Aqsa Compound. It was established in 1436, then became an Ottoman imperial provincial madrasa.

It is among the few Jerusalem madrasas with a woman endower; the others were the Khātūniyya Madrasa and the little-known Barudiyya.

== History ==
The school was founded in the Mamluk era, before the Ottomans began ruling Jerusalem. Its endower was a woman from the Ottoman lands, Iṣfahān Shāh Khātūn. She was a wife of Çandarlı Ibrahim Pasha the Elder, of the Çandarlı family. She came from a distinguished family, being a direct descendant of Sheikh Edebali. She stipulated that the income from 10 villages in Anatolia should go to the endowment for the madrasa. She died in 1436 or 1437, and was buried in her madrasa.

=== Ottoman era ===
A defter written soon after 1540, in the early Ottoman era, noted that Kafr Qara was the only Palestinian endowment for the school. The whole of the revenue of Kafr Qara, a total of 3,400 aspers annually, belonged to this endowment.

By the late 1500s, it became an imperial provincial madrasa, i.e., the imperial Ottoman court appointed its Hanafi muftis. This was probably due to the Çandarlı family's close relationship with the Ottoman Empire. Hence, the Banu Abi al-Lutf family, which dominated the Jerusalem mufti position, also came to dominate the leadership of this madrasa.

In 1656, the mudarris Ali Effendi al-Lutfi requested permission to make necessary repairs. A reference early in the century is to it having 9 students (talaba).

The school operated for at least four centuries. In the 18th century, the building became a private residence.

== Name ==
Although the name literally means "the Ottoman School", it might not have been its original meaning. During the era when the school's name was recorded, it was extremely rare for Ottoman subjects who were not actual members of the House of Osman to be called ʿUthmānī. (They were instead called Rūmi.)

Some Arabic sources believe that the name ʿUthmāniyya comes from the full name of the endower, which they reconstruct as Iṣfahān Shāh Khātūn bint Maḥmūd al-ʿUthmānī (أصفهان شاه خاتون بنت محمود العثمانية). Other researchers note that al-ʿUthmānī might be her nisba name, and that it is possible that she was descended from or related to someone named ʿUthmān.

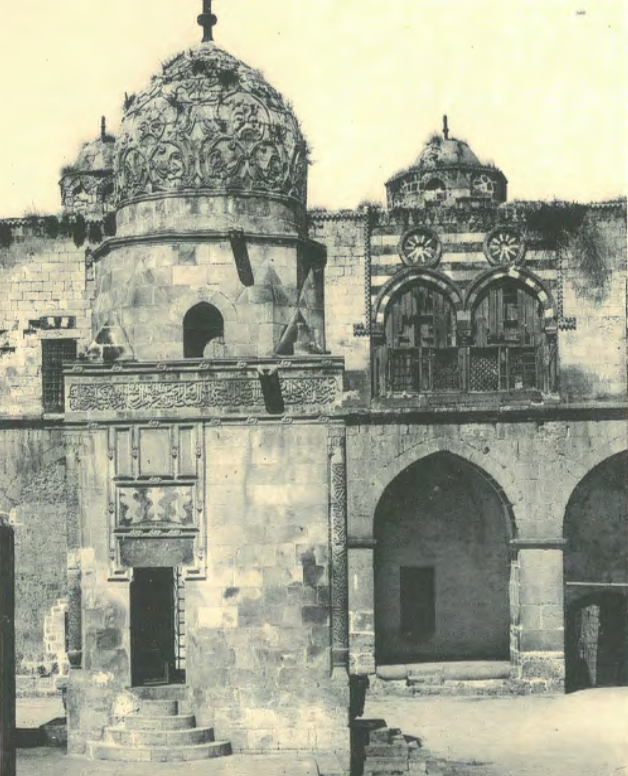
1893: with the Qaytbay Fountain in the front, to the left

== Description ==
It consists of two storeys. On the ground floor, there is from north to south along the Haram side: first a tomb chamber, then a courtyard, then the "lower mosque". The tomb chamber has an entrance from the north side, that is from the Zuqāq Bāb al-Maṭhara, a no-exit alley.

On the upper floor, above the portico there is a distinctive double-arched loggia room, with a room to the north which used to be domed. On the eastern façade, the loggia's arches are topped by rosettes. To the south of the loggia room is an assembly hall. All of the rooms on the upper floor were originally to be reached only through the assembly hall.

Its roof has a small pale-turquoise dome.

=== Epigraphy ===
An inscription on the madrasa reads:

In the name of God, the Merciful, the Compassionate. The construction of this blessed madrasa was ordered by the noble and honorable Lady Isfahan Shah Khatun, the daughter of the late Amir Mahmud, al-ʿUthmaniyya, known as khanum (may God show her His benevolence). She passed away in the year 840 [1436–37 CE]. Its construction was completed at the close of the aforementioned year through the efforts of Khawaja Jamiʿ, son of Sati, from Asia Minor [al-Rūmī].

== Environs ==
Its first storey is west of the compound's west wall's riwāq (arcade), which includes the Ablution Gate (and the Cotton Merchants' Gate farther north). Beyond the riwaq, to its east, is the Fountain of Qayt Bay.

To its north is Zuqāq Bāb al-Maṭhara (a short alley), leading to the Ablution Gate in the east. Across the alley is Ribāṭ az-Zamanī, a ribat. And farther north, across the Cotton Merchants' Market, is Khātūniyya Madrasa.

To its south is al-Baladiyya Madrasa, and to its southwest al-Ashrafiyya Madrasa.

== Bibliography ==
- Burak, Guy (2013). "Dynasty, Law, and the Imperial provincial Madrasa: the case of Al-Madrasa Al-ʿUthmaniyya in Ottoman Jerusalem". Int. J. Middle East Stud. 45: 111–125. doi:10.1017/S0020743812001286.
- Berchem, van, M. (1922). MIFAO 43 Matériaux pour un Corpus Inscriptionum Arabicarum Part 2 Syrie du Sud T.1 Jérusalem "Ville" (in French and Arabic). Cairo: Impr. de l'Institut français d'archéologie orientale.
- Berchem, van, M. (1920). MIFAO 45.2 Matériaux pour un Corpus Inscriptionum Arabicarum Part 2 Syrie du Sud T.3 Fasc. 2 Jérusalem Index général. Cairo: Impr. de l'Institut français d'archéologie orientale.
- Burgoyne, Michael Hamilton (1987). Mamluk Jerusalem. ISBN 090503533X.
- ed-dyn, Moudjir (1876). Sauvaire (ed.). Histoire de Jérusalem et d'Hébron depuis Abraham jusqu'à la fin du XVe siècle de J.-C. : fragments de la Chronique de Moudjir-ed-dyn.
- Warren, C. (1870). "Bab el-Mathara". Quarterly Statement - Palestine Exploration Fund. 2: 107.
