= An-Nāranj Pool =

Feature in Al-Aqsa, Jerusalem

Coordinates: 31°46′38.72″N 35°14′04.90″E

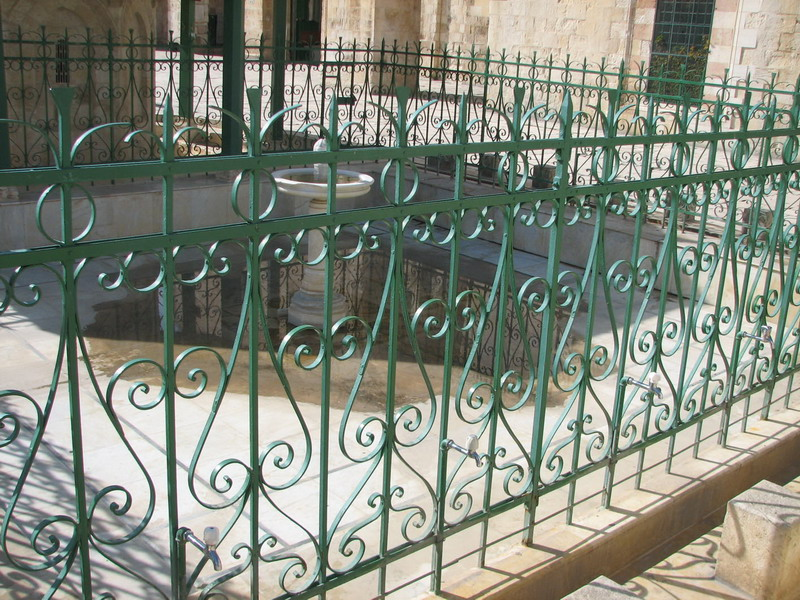
The pool inside railings

The an-Nāranj Pool (Arabic: بركة النارنج Birkat an-Nāranj, lit. 'pond of the bitter orange') is a small pool in the al-Aqsa Mosque Compound. It is at the compound's western esplanade, between the Fountain of Qasim Pasha (Sabil an-Nāranj) and the Fountain of Qayt Bay (to its south).

It was also known as al-Rāranj (الرارنج) and al-Ghāghanj (الغاغنج); both are phonetic variations of an-Nāranj.

It was built in the Ottoman period. It was restored during the reign of Sultan Qaitbay and again in 1527 by Qasim Pasha, a governor of Jerusalem. In 1922, the Supreme Muslim Council reconstructed the pool, paved it with marble and encircled it with banisters. The pool is seven metres wide.

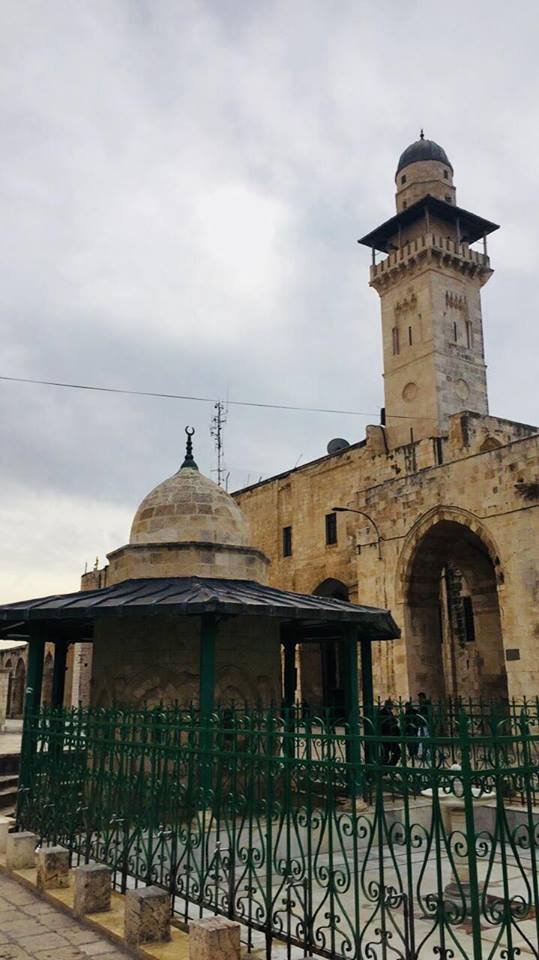
The Fountain of Qasim Pasha and the pool; the Chain Gate Minaret behind
