= Fountain of Qayt Bay =

Islamic structure in Al-Aqsa, Jerusalem

Coordinates: 31°46′39″N 35°14′04″E

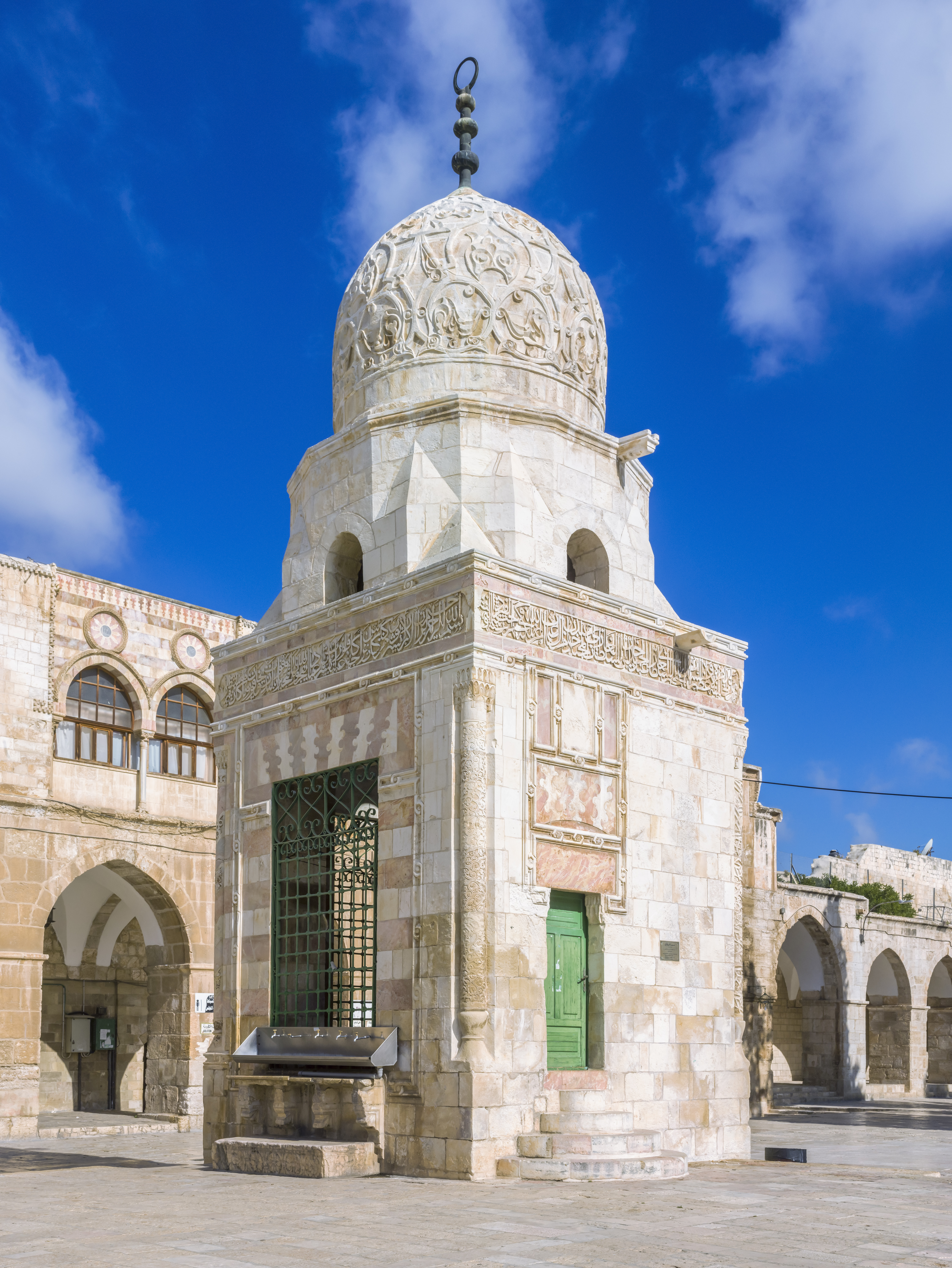
The fountain, with the Uthmaniyya Madrasa behind

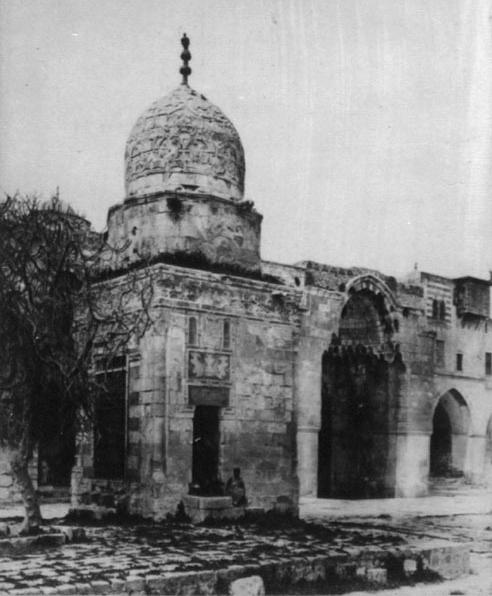
View from the southwest, 1919

Fountain of Qayt Bay or Sabil Qaitbay (Arabic: سبيل قايتباي) is a domed public fountain (sabil) on the western esplanade of the al-Aqsa Mosque in Jerusalem, near the Madrasa al-Ashrafiyya. Built in the 15th century by the Mamluks of Egypt, it was completed in the reign of Sultan Qaytbay, after whom it is named. It is also colloquially known as the Fountain of Hamidiye due to Sultan Abdul Hamid II’s restoration. It has been considered, "after the Dome of the Rock, the most beautiful edifice in the al-Aqsa Mosque".

== History ==
The fountain/sabil was originally built in 1455 on the orders of the Mamluk sultan Sayf ad-Din Inal. The fountain where the Fountain of Qayt Bay is located today; nothing remains of this original Fountain of Sayf ad-Din Inal. In 1482 (AH 887), then Sultan al-Ashraf Qaytbay (r. AH 872–901 / AD 1468–96) completely renovated the structure and made it an extension to his neighbouring Madrasa al-Ashrafiyya, which Qaytbay had ordered built to replace another earlier Mamluk building (in this case, a madrasa built by Sultan Khusqadam in 1465). It is probable that the same team of engineers, architects and builders constructed both the Madrasa al-Ashrafiyya and the Fountain of Qayt Bay, and that they were sent by Sultan Qaytbay from Egypt to Quds to execute the work. The fountain was constructed in a style mostly seen in Egypt, characteristic of the late Burji Mamluk architecture of Qaytbay's period. In 1882–83, the Ottoman sultan Abdul Hamid II restored the fountain and made some additions to it. The fountain which is still used continues to provide visitors to the al-Haram al-Sharif with fresh water.

== Architecture ==
The Islamic heritage of Jerusalem was maintained by the successor to the Prophet, caliphs, begin with, such as Umar and Abd al-Malik, but also by sultans the likes of Salah al-Din, al-Malik al-Nasir Muhammad, and Qayt Bay, and viceroys such as al-Amir al-Nashashibi. Evidence of these rulers' veneration for Quds is found not only in their exploits as recorded by Mujir al-Din but also in the institutions they founded and patronized, the monuments that survive. The one of that is the Fountain of Qayt Bay.

Placed on a raised prayer platform, together with a freestanding mihrab, the Fountain of Qayt Bay is a three-tiered structure over 13 metres high, consisting of a base, a transition zone and its dome. The tallest part of the fountain is the base, which is a simple square room built in an ablaq construction method of blending red and cream stones, with wide grilled windows and a small entrance. The windows are located on three sides of the building, and there are four steps leading up to the windows on the northern and the western sides, as well as a large stone bench beneath the southern window. On the eastern wall of the fountain, four semi-circular steps lead up to the entrance door. The complex zone of transition steps in several stages from the square base to the round and high drum that merges into the dome itself. At its peak, the building is crowned by a pointed dome decorated with low-relief arabesque stone carvings. The dome is crowned by a bronze crescent, which, unlike other crescents in the sanctuary, faces east and west. It is the only significant dome of its kind that exists outside Cairo and also one of the finest examples of the Mamluks’ use of highly ornate stone-engraved calligraphy. On all four sides of the fountain are ornate inscriptions containing Qur'anic verses, details of the original Mamluk building and the 1883 renovation of the structure. Mamluk-era star-pattern strap work details the building interior, but the external lintels are from the Ottoman era of rule in Palestine. The 1883 renovation largely kept Qaitbay's structure mostly intact.

The fountain is dated by an inscription band which goes around the top of the all four sides of the facade. The date is further verified by the writing of the historian, Mujir al-Din al-Hanbali (d. 928 / 1521) who describes the works of Sultan Qaytbay in Quds.

== Environs ==
It sits on a maṣṭaba (elevated platform) called Maṣṭabat Sabīl Qāītbay.

It is north of the an-Nāranj Pool and Fountain of Qasim Pasha.

It is between the Ablution Gate (to its west) and western colonnade (east)

The Ashrafiyya and Uthmaniyya Madrasas are also to its west.
