= Al-Mawazin =

Decorative archways in Al-Aqsa, Jerusalem

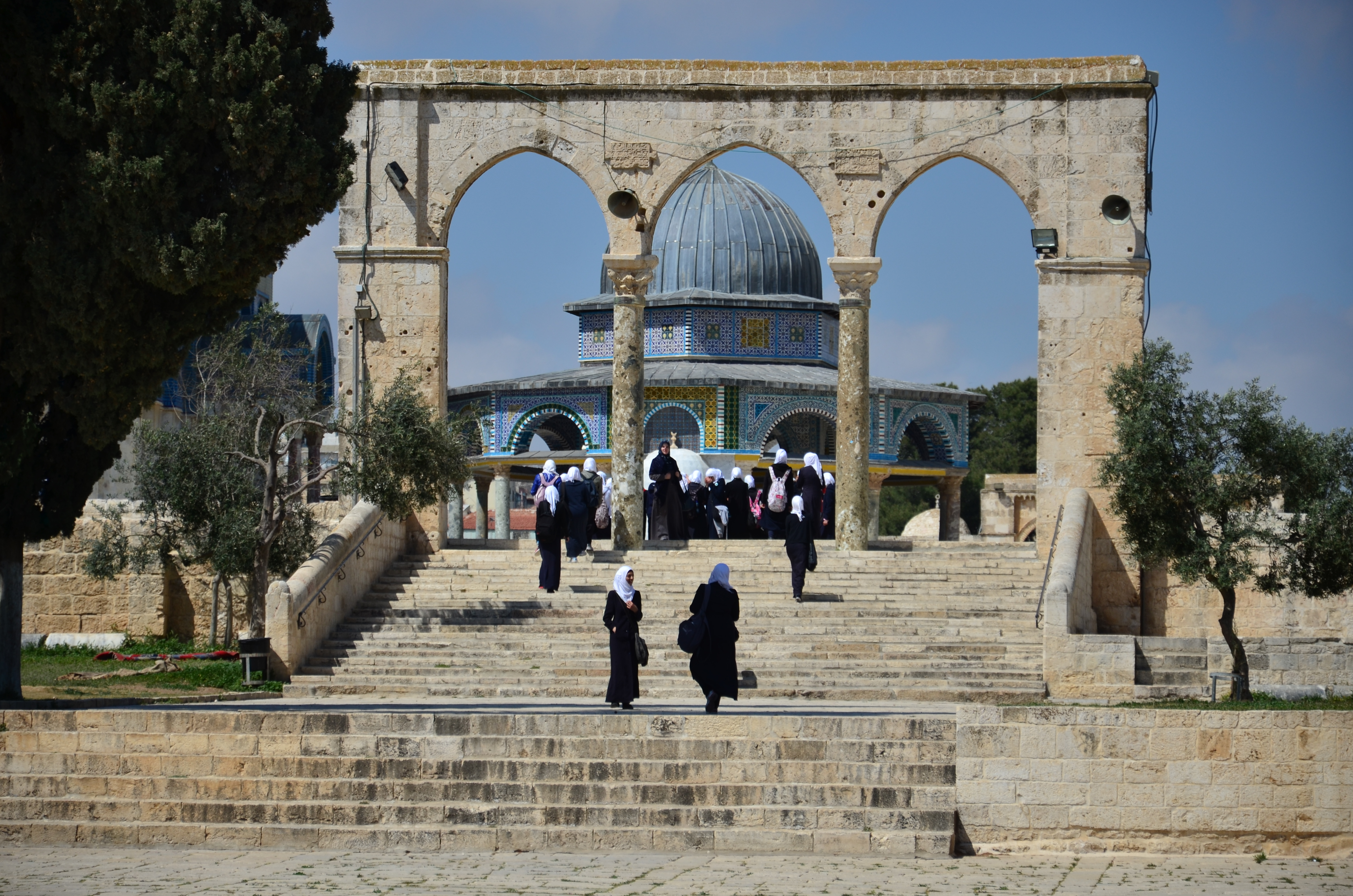
A view of the southeastern looking inwards towards the Dome of the Rock

Eight freestanding archways called al-Mawazin or more commonly al-Bawā’ik (البوائك, plural of بائكة) – also meaning "arcade". (see names below) are located at the top of the staircases leading to the platform (maṣṭaba) of the Dome of the Rock from the surrounding courtyard (ṣaḥn) below. Each archway consists of open arches supported by 2 to 4 columns, set between two pilasters.

One of the reasons mentioned for these doors is that the beauty of the Dome of the Rock should not appear right away, marking a separation between the city and the sacred place.

== Names ==
They are called mawāzīn (موازين lit. 'weighing scales', plural of mīzān, ميزان) because of a belief that scales will hang from these arches to weigh souls on Judgment Day.

They are also simply called qanaṭir (قناطر, lit. 'arches', plural of قنطرة), i.e., arcades or arched colonnades.

== Dates of construction ==
With the exception of the arcades bearing inscriptions which attest that they date back to the Mamluk period, the others probably predate the Crusades, but their dating is difficult. However, it is very likely that some Mawāzīn date back to the period of the construction of the Dome of the Rock and that they were an integral part of its initial construction plan. In particular, it is thought that the four arcades facing the four entrances were built at the same time as the dome.

== Gallery ==
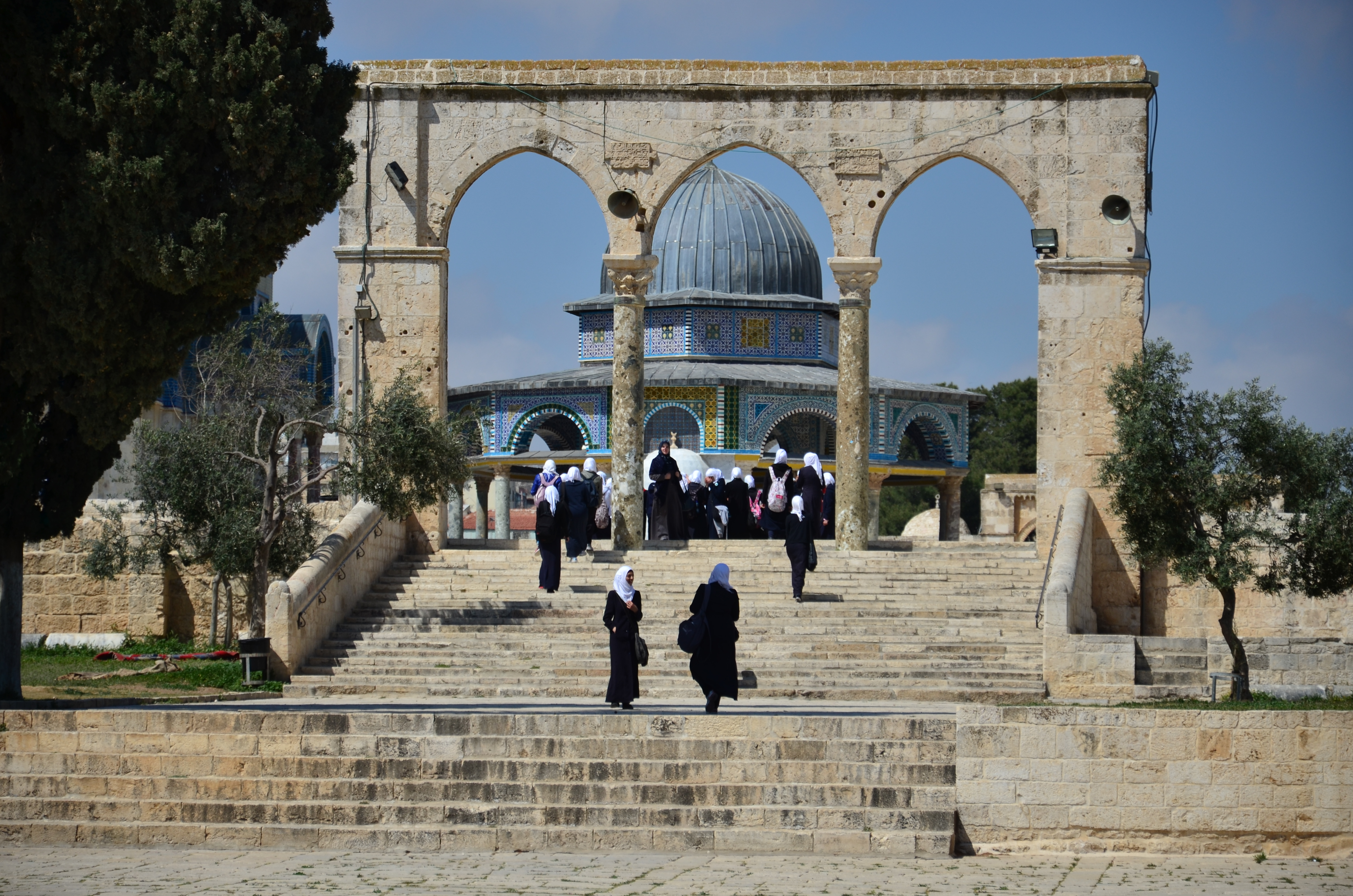
The southeastern colonnade (background: Dome of the Rock)

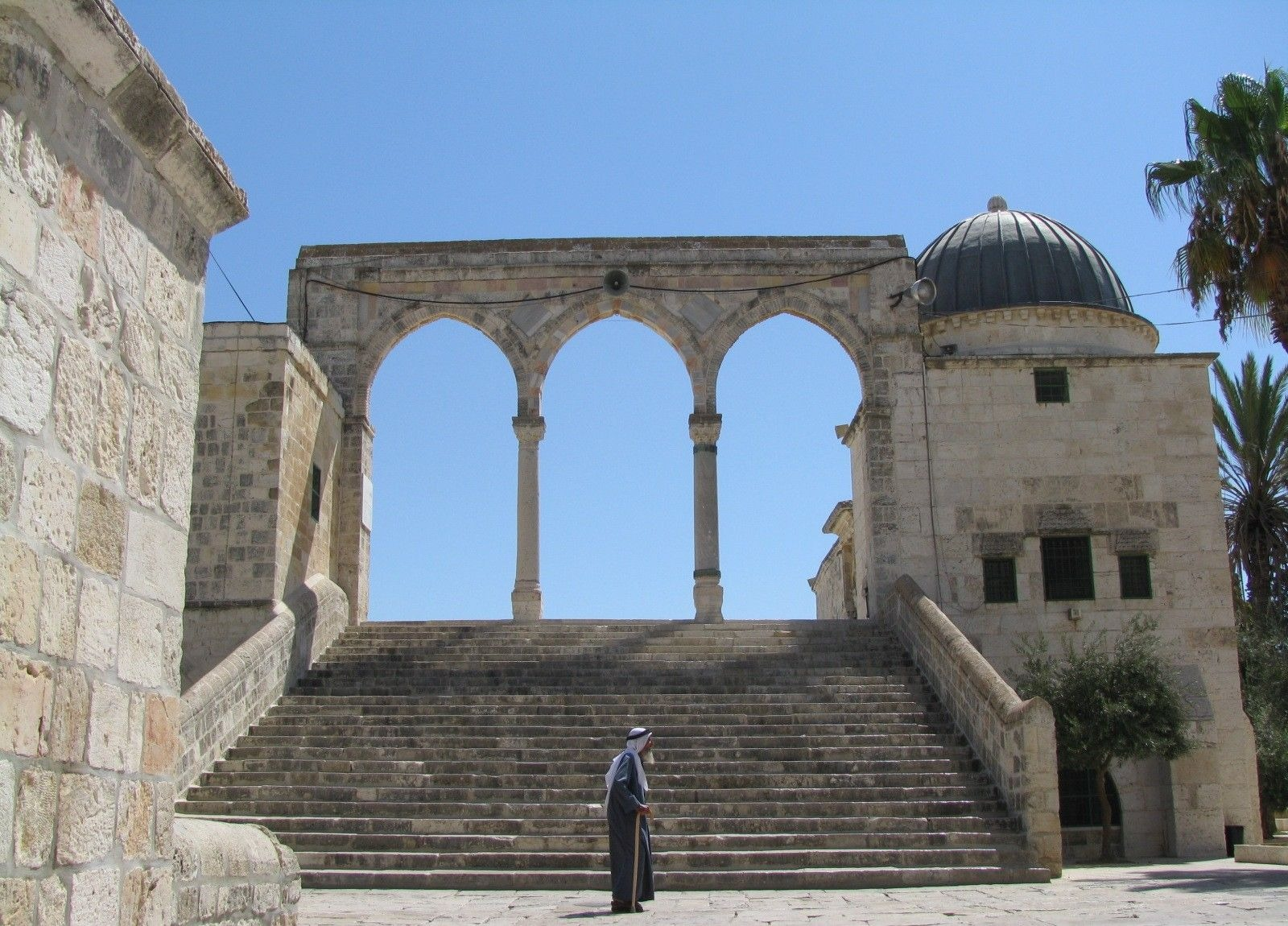
The southwestern colonnade (foreground: Dome of the Spirits)

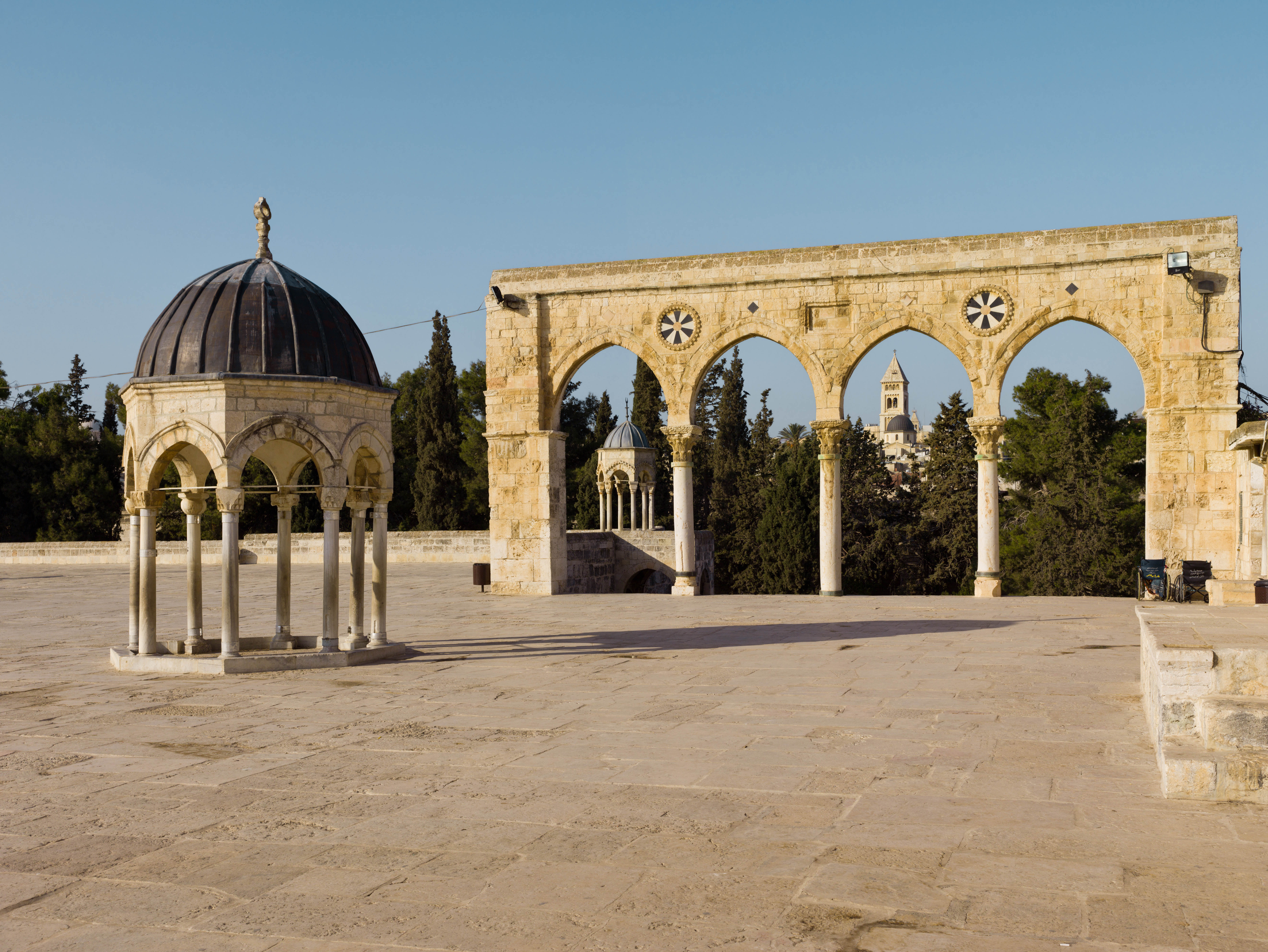
The northwestern colonnade

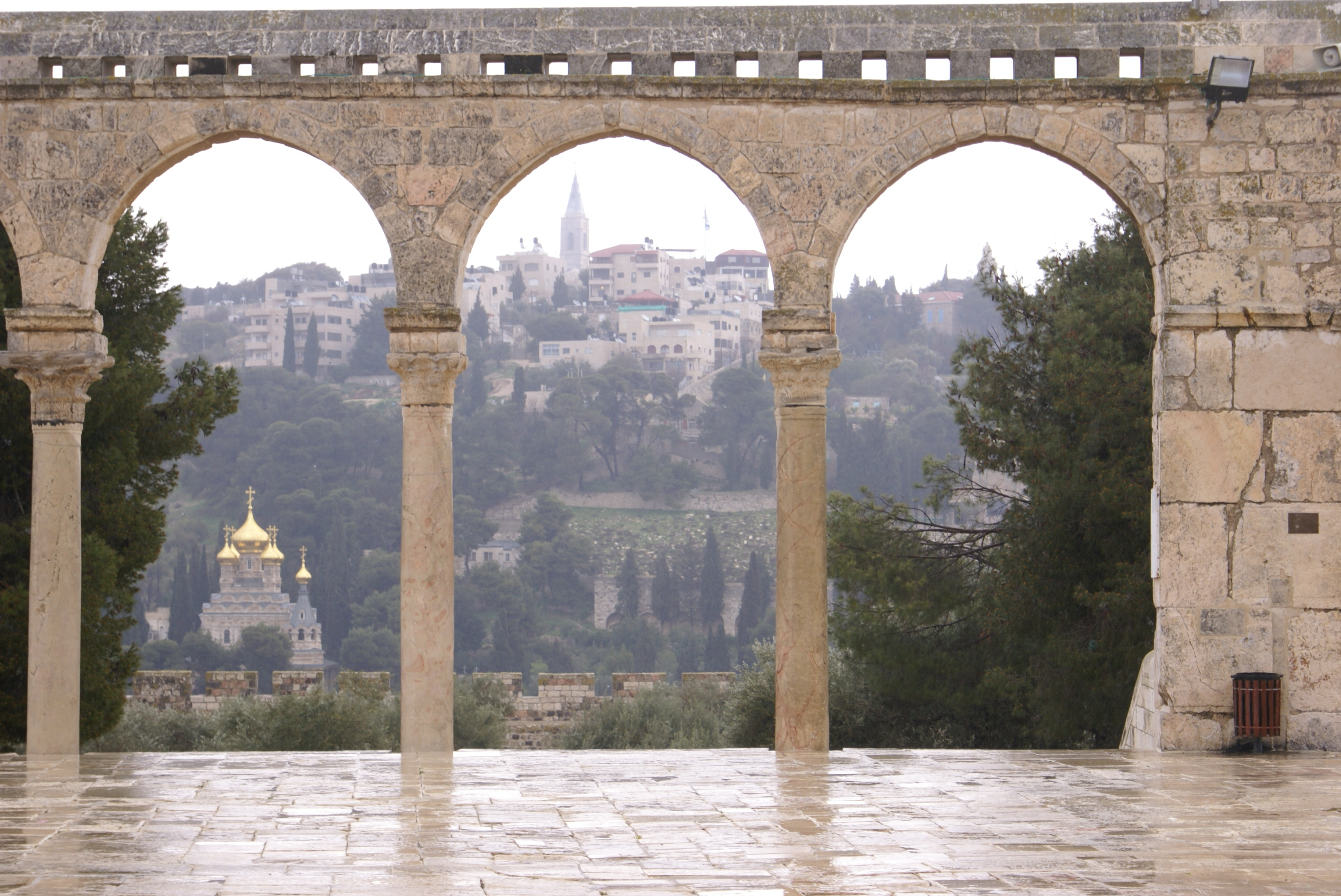
The eastern colonnade (background: Church of Mary Magdalene)
