= Al-Khatuniyya Madrasa (Jerusalem) =

Islamic school in Al-Aqsa, Jerusalem

Al-Khatuniyya
- المدرسة الخاتونية
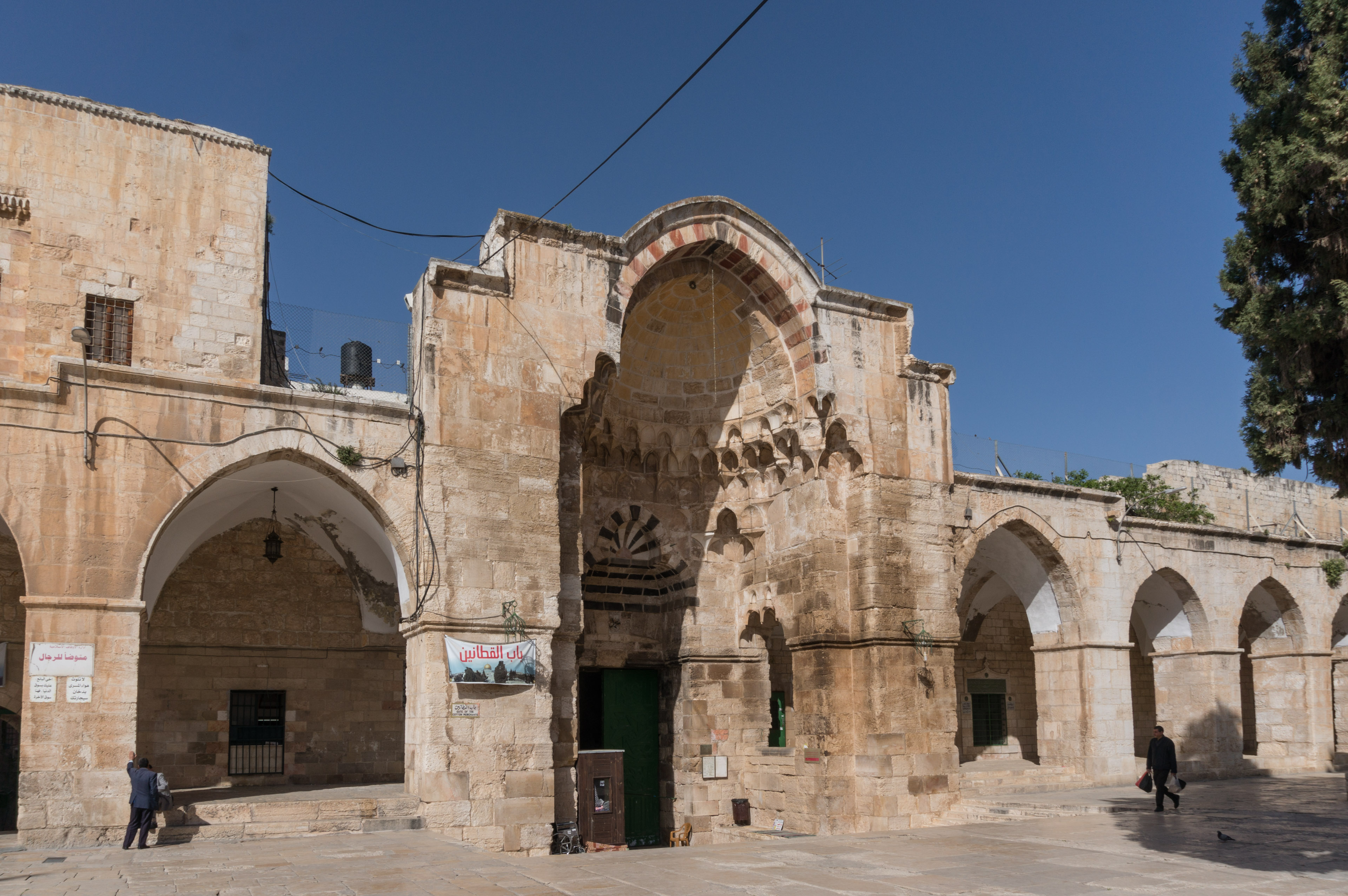
- Al-Khatuniyya, to the north (right) of the Cotton Merchants' Gate. Seen from inside the Ḥaram, looking west.

Religion
- Affiliation: Islam

Location
- Location: Haram esh-Sharif, Jerusalem
- Interactive map of Al-Khatuniyya
- Palestine grid: 172/131
- Coordinates: 31°46′41.09″N 35°14′03.05″E

Architecture
- Type: Madrasa
- Style: Mamluk architecture Islamic
- Completed: 1354–1380
- Materials: stone

The Khātūniyya Madrasa (Arabic: المدرسة الخاتونيـة al-Madrasa al-Khātūniyya) is a mausoleum in Jerusalem and was a school. It is by the western esplanade of the al-Aqsa Compound (the Ḥaram esh-Sharīf). It was built between 1354 and 1380.

It is one of the three Jerusalem madrasas endowed by a woman, the others being the ʿUthmāniyya Madrasa and the obscure Barudiyya.

== History ==
It was first endowed in 1349 by Oghul Khatun (أغل خاتون ʾUghul Khātūn), a woman from Baghdad and a daughter of Shams al-Din Muhammad bin Sayf al-Din. She was called al-Qazaniyya, possibly meaning she was married to Qazan Shah, an emir. The lady Iṣfahān Shāh, a daughter of Qazan Shah, completed the construction by giving another endowment to the project in 1380.

Part of the endowment consisted of agricultural land known as "the Camel’s Back", also known as "the Camel’s Belly". In a court record in 1491-92, the waqf of Oghul Khatun is mentioned, and it is noted that the Camel’s Belly is near Deir Jarir, and that its yearly revenue was 3,800 aspers.

In the late Mamluk era, it served as the retirement residence of several former emirs who had been dismissed and sent into exile to Jerusalem.

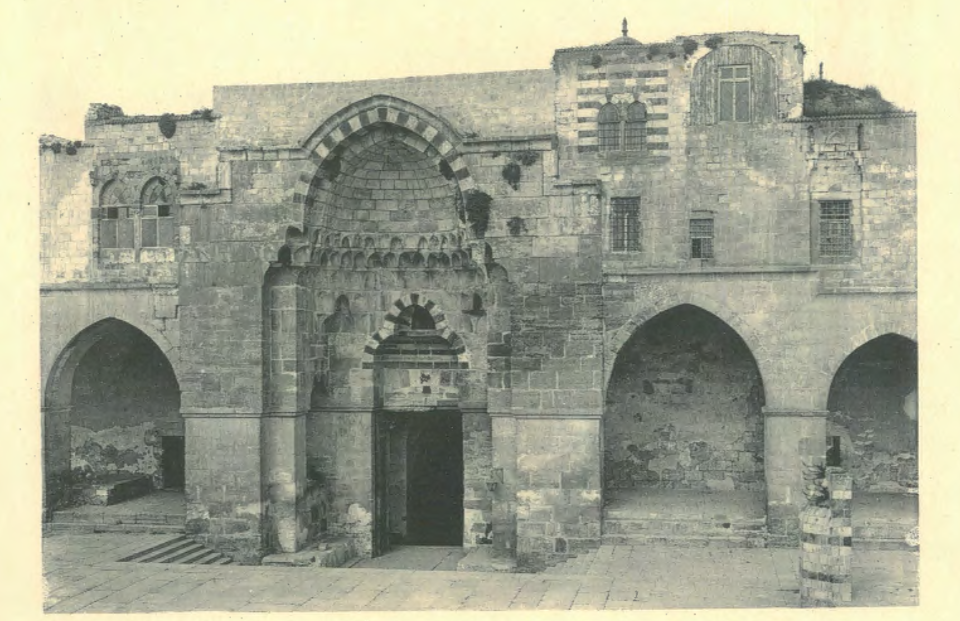
1914: the structure above the portal to the right, belonging to al-Khatuniyya, have since been removed.

In the early Ottoman era, the building's administration was in the Ibn Jama‘a family.

It is now in disrepair and intensive restorations would be needed.

== Description ==
It consists of two levels. The higher level is beside the Ḥaram compound and includes two iwans, a tomb chamber, and an assembly hall. The lower level is below the level of the Ḥaram and includes habitation cells around a courtyard. The courtyard has a wellhead, giving access to a cistern below.

In addition to the tomb of Oghul Khatun, it includes the tombs of several prominent people:

- Mohammad Ali Jauhar (Muhammad Ali al-Hindi), a founder of the All-India Muslim League.
- some members of the Husayni (Husseini) family:
  - Musa al-Husayni, a leader in the Palestine Arab Congress.
  - Abd al-Qader al-Husseini, an uprising commander.
  - Faisal Husseini, a statesman.
  - Ahmed Hilmi Pasha, soldier, economist, and politician
- Abdul Hameed Shoman, the founder of the Arab Bank.

== Environs ==
To its east, it joins the Ḥaram compound's west wall's riwāq (arcade), which includes the Cotton Merchants' Gate to the south.

It is immediately north of the Cotton Merchants' Market. Farther south is ʿUthmāniyya Madrasa.

To its north are the Muzhiriyya & Arghūniyya Madrasas. Its current entrance is a small passageway between those two madrasas, leading north to Iron Gate Road.

== Bibliography ==
- Berchem, van, M. (1920). MIFAO 45.2 Matériaux pour un Corpus Inscriptionum Arabicarum Part 2 Syrie du Sud T.3 Fasc. 2 Jérusalem Index général. Cairo: Impr. de l'Institut français d'archéologie orientale.
- Burgoyne, Michael Hamilton (1987). Mamluk Jerusalem. British School of Archaeology in Jerusalem by the World of Islam Festival Trust. ISBN 090503533X.
- D’Amato, Cladio; Attilio Petruccioli; Giulia Annalinda Neglia; Giuseppe Rociola; Claudio Rubini; Domenico Catania (2009). The Typologic Analysis of Mamluk Public Building in Al-Quds/Jerusalem: The Ribat and the Madrasa A Work in Progress. Istanbul. ISBN 978-92-9063-190-3. (pp. 129−140)
- Hütteroth, W.-D.; Abdulfattah, K. (1977). Historical Geography of Palestine, Transjordan and Southern Syria in the Late 16th Century. Erlanger Geographische Arbeiten, Sonderband 5. Erlangen, Germany: Vorstand der Fränkischen Geographischen Gesellschaft. ISBN 3-920405-41-2.
- Moudjir ed-dyn (1876). Sauvaire (ed.). Histoire de Jérusalem et d'Hébron depuis Abraham jusqu'à la fin du XVe siècle de J.-C. : fragments de la Chronique de Moudjir-ed-dyn.
