= Minarets of Al-Aqsa =

Minarets on the Temple Mount at Jerusalem

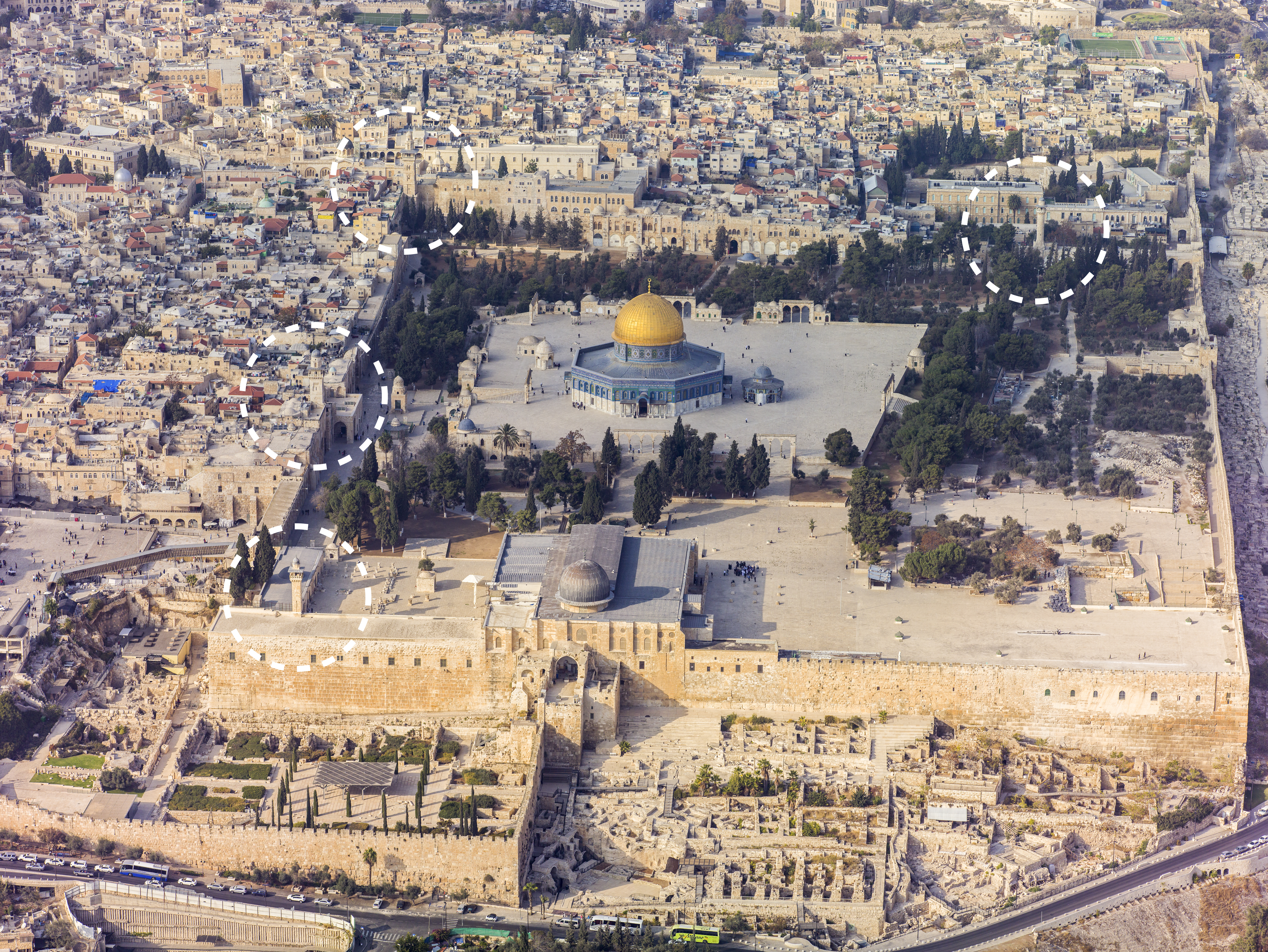
The minarets are situated around the edges of the compound. In this picture, three minarets can be seen on the left and one at the top right.

The Al-Aqsa mosque compound in the Old City of Jerusalem has four minarets in total: three on the western flank and one on the northern flank.

== Background ==
Early Muslim writer Shihab Al-Din Ahmad Ibn Muhammad Ibn 'Abd Rabbihi (d. 940 AD), in his Kitab Al-Iqd Al-Farid, describe the pre-Crusader Al-Aqsa enclave as having four minarets.

After they conquered Jerusalem, defeating the Crusaders, the Mamluks built or renovated eight major minarets in the Holy City. Dating of the minarets in Jerusalem has been done according to the style and shape. Mamluk minarets generally have a square shape and are built at various locations along the perimeter of the Haram al-Sharif.

== The four minarets ==
=== Ghawanima Minaret ===
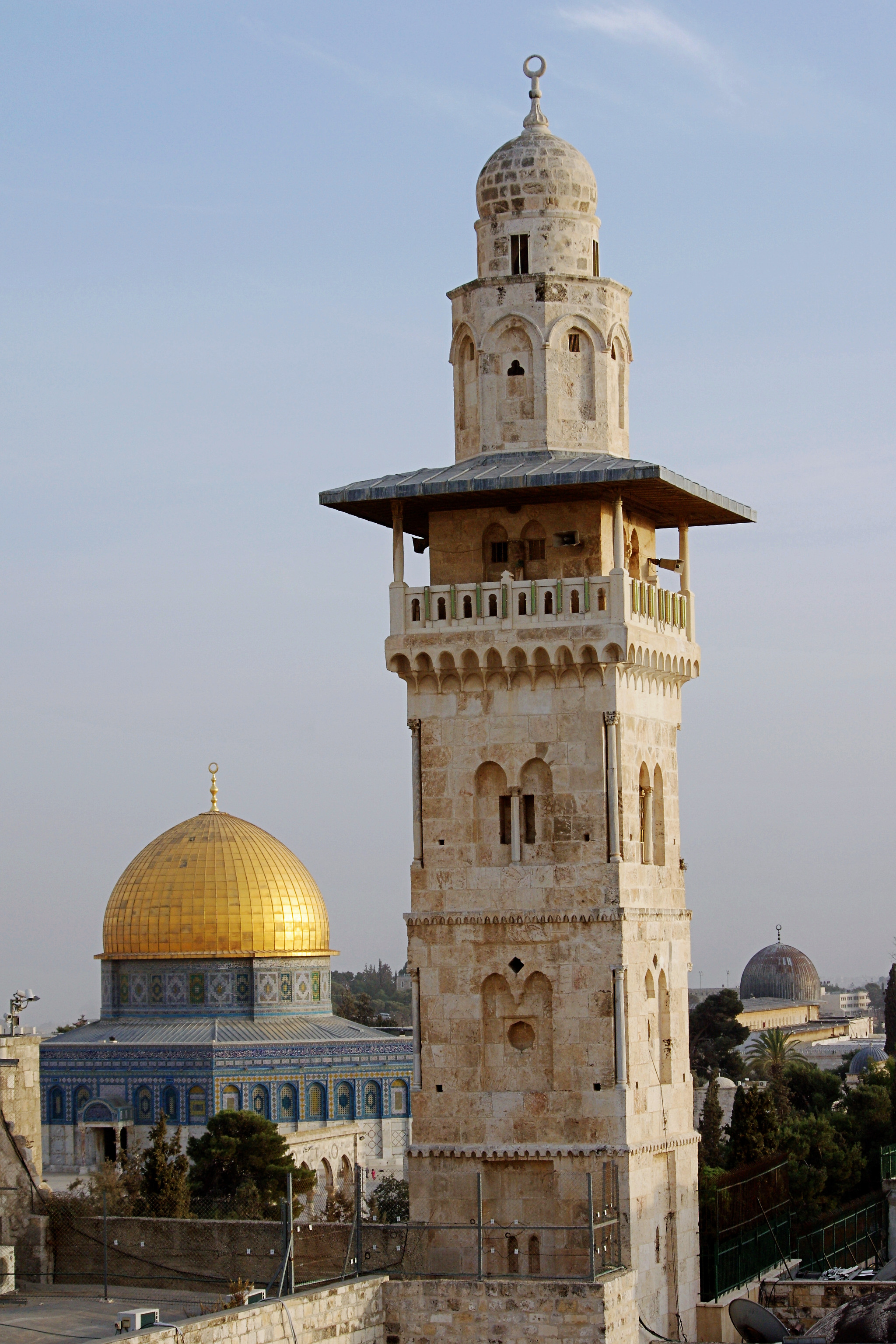
Ghawanima Minaret

The Ghawanima Minaret or Al-Ghawanima Minaret was built at the northwestern corner of the Noble Sanctuary during the reign of Sultan Lajin circa 1298, or between 1297 and 1299, or circa circa 1298. It is named after Shaykh Ghanim ibn Ali ibn Husayn, who was appointed the Shaykh of the Salahiyyah Madrasah by Saladin.

The minaret is located near the Ghawanima Gate and is the most decorated minaret of the compound. It is 38.5 meters tall, with six stories and an internal staircase of 120 steps, making it the highest minaret inside the Al-Aqsa compound. Its design may have been influenced by the Romanesque style of older Crusader buildings in the city.

The tower's main shaft is cuboid, with a square base, while its upper part, above the balcony, is octagonal. It is almost entirely made of stone, apart from a timber canopy over the muezzin's balcony. Marble columns are employed in its decoration. The minaret is excavated into the naturally occurring layer of bedrock in the northwest corner of the Haram. The main part of the tower has a cuboid shape with a square base. It is partitioned into several 'stories', visually divided on the outside by stone moldings and muqarnas (stalactite) cornices. The first two stories are wider and form the base of the tower, followed by an additional four stories, including the muezzin's gallery or balcony. Above the level of the balcony is a smaller octagonal turret surmounted by a bulbous dome with a circular drum. The stairway is external on the first two floors but becomes an internal spiral structure until it reaches the muezzin's gallery, from which the call for prayer was performed.

The western tunnel, which was dug by the Israeli state, has weakened the minaret's foundations, resulting in calls for its renovation in 2001. Also, the Islamic Waqf Directorate has renovated this gate after an Israeli extremist burnt it in 1998.

=== Bab al-Silsila Minaret (Minaret of the Chain Gate) ===
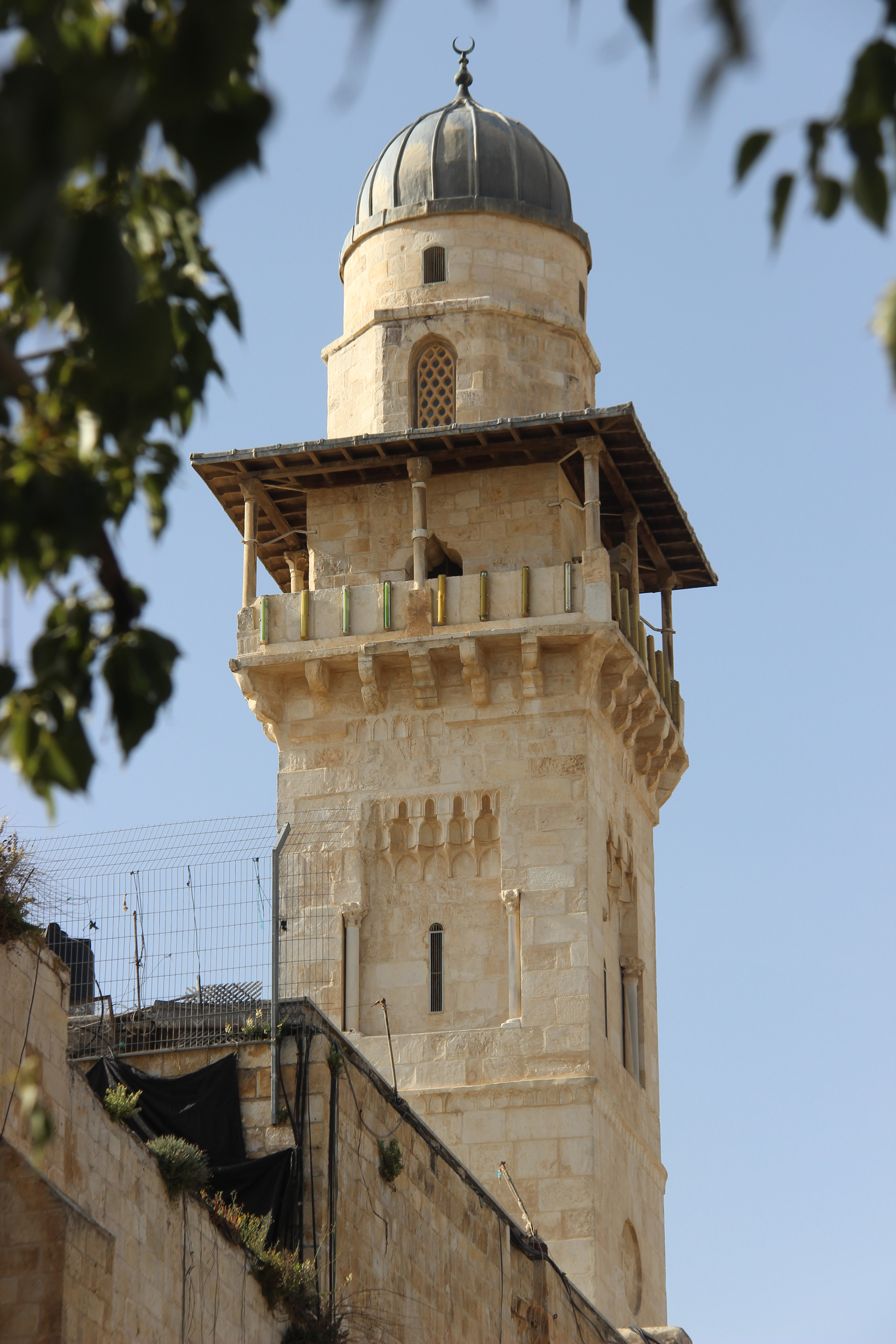
Bab al-Silsila Minaret

In 1329, Tankiz, the Mamluk governor of Syria, ordered the construction of a third minaret, known as the Bab al-Silsila Minaret (Minaret of the Chain Gate), near the Chain Gate, on the western border of the al-Aqsa Mosque. The minaret is also known as Mahkamah Minaret since the minaret is located near the Madrasa al-Tankiziyya which served as a law court during the times of Ottomans.

This minaret, possibly replacing an earlier Umayyad minaret, is built in the traditional Syrian square tower type and is made entirely out of stone.

Since the 16th century, it has been a tradition that the best muezzin of the adhan (the call to prayer) is assigned to this minaret because the first call to each of the five daily prayers is raised from it, giving the signal for the muezzins of mosques throughout Jerusalem to follow suit.

It is located next to the Chain Gate on the porches to the west of Masjid al-Aqsa. It is on a square-shaped platform with four corners and has a closed balcony, which is kept standing by stone columns. It has an internal staircase with 80 steps. The minaret is reached via the Madrasa al-Ashrafiyya. The height of the minaret is 35 meters. It was repaired by the Islamic Foundation after the Jerusalem earthquake in 1922.

Bab al-Silsila Minaret is bordered by Al Aqsa Compound's main entrance. As stated in the inscriptions, its reconstruction was done by the Governor of Syria when Amir Tankiz was establishing the Madrasa al-Tankiziyya. It was replaced by an Ottoman-style 'pencil point' spire, which was replaced by a smooth cutout and a semicircular dome after the dome was damaged in an earthquake in the 19th century. During the restoration of 1923-4, the existing canopy and lead coating on the dome were erected.

Today, Israeli security forces do not allow Muslims to approach or enter Bab al-Silsila Minaret, as they believe they protect praying Jews in front of the Western Wall which is near Bab al-Silsila Minaret.

=== Fakhriyya Minaret ===
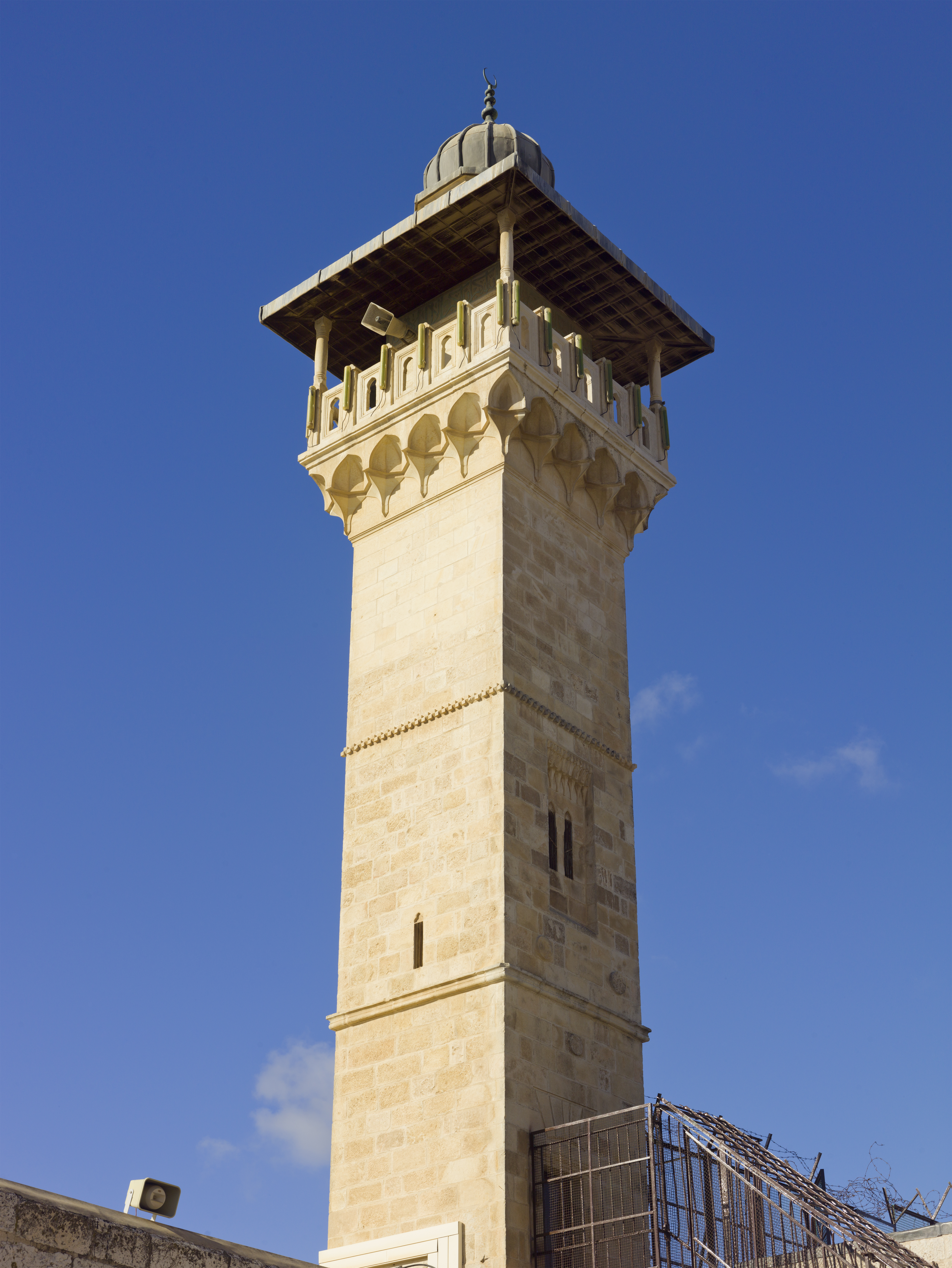
Fakhriyya Minaret

The Fakhriyya Minaret or Al-Fakhiriyya Minaret, was built on the junction of the southern wall and western wall, over the solid part of the wall. The exact date of its original construction is not known but it was built sometime after 1345 and before 1496. It was named after Fakhr al-Din al-Khalili, the father of Sharif al-Din Abd al-Rahman who supervised the building's construction. The minaret was rebuilt in 1920.

The Fakhriyya Minaret was built in the traditional Syrian style, with a square-shaped base and shaft, divided by moldings into three floors above which two lines of muqarnas decorate the muezzin's balcony. The niche is surrounded by a square chamber that ends in a lead-covered stone dome. After the minaret was damaged in the Jerusalem earthquake, the minaret's dome was covered with lead.

=== Bab al-Asbat Minaret (Minaret of the Tribes' Gate) ===
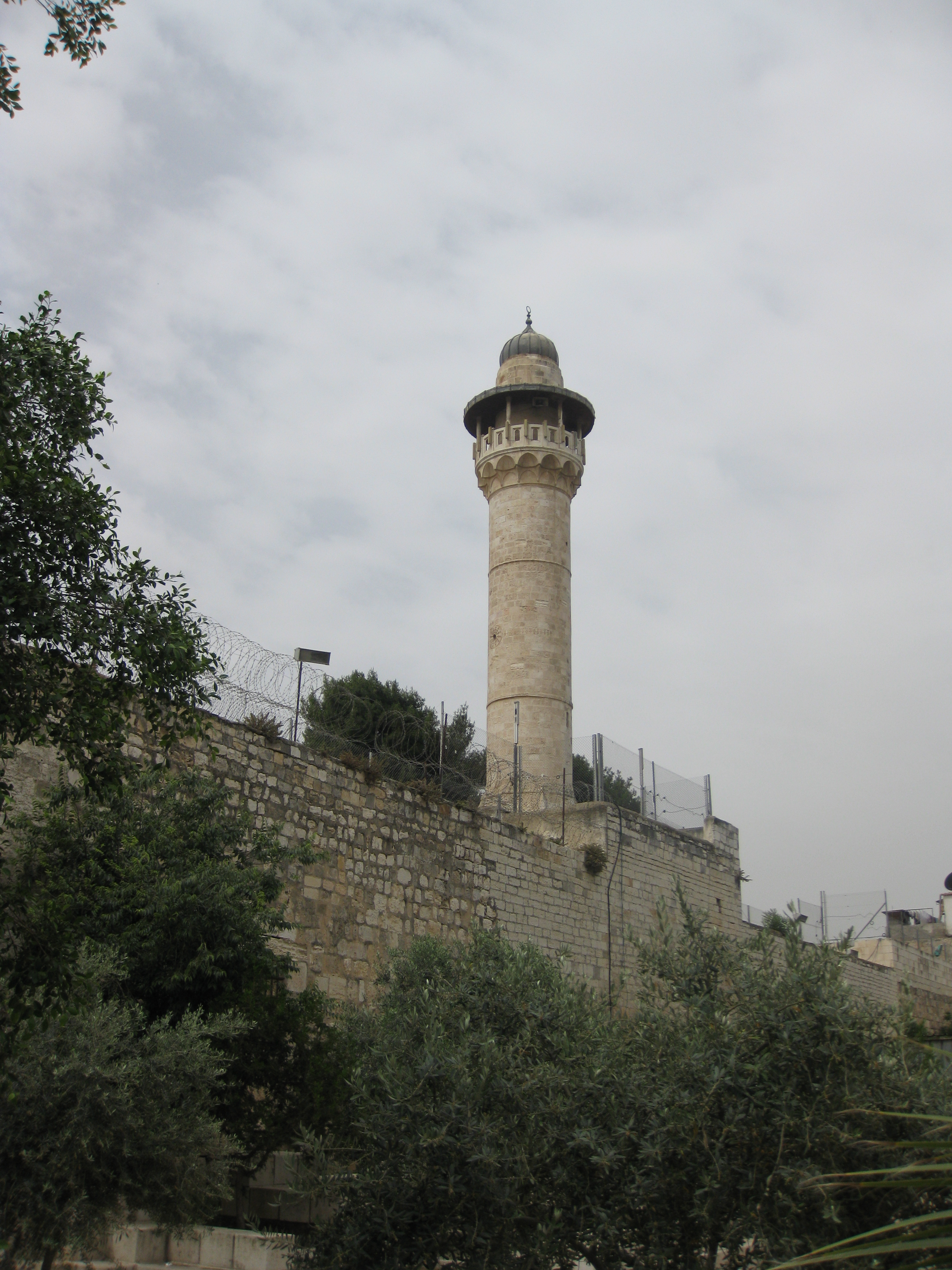
Bab al-Asbat Minaret

The last and most notable minaret was built in 1367: the Bāb al-ʾAsbāṭ Minaret, near the Tribes' Gate (al-ʾAsbāṭ Gate). It is composed of a cylindrical stone shaft (built later by the Ottomans), which springs up from a rectangular Mamluk-built base on top of a triangular transition zone. The shaft narrows above the muezzin's balcony and is dotted with circular windows, ending with a bulbous dome. The dome was reconstructed after the 1927 earthquake.

== Proposed fifth minaret ==
There are no minarets in the eastern portion of the mosque. However, in 2006, King Abdullah II of Jordan announced his intention to build a fifth minaret overlooking the Mount of Olives. The King Hussein Minaret is planned to be the tallest structure in the Old City of Jerusalem.
