= Foundation Stone =

Rock at centre of the Dome of the Rock shrine

Coordinates: 31.7780°N 35.2354°E

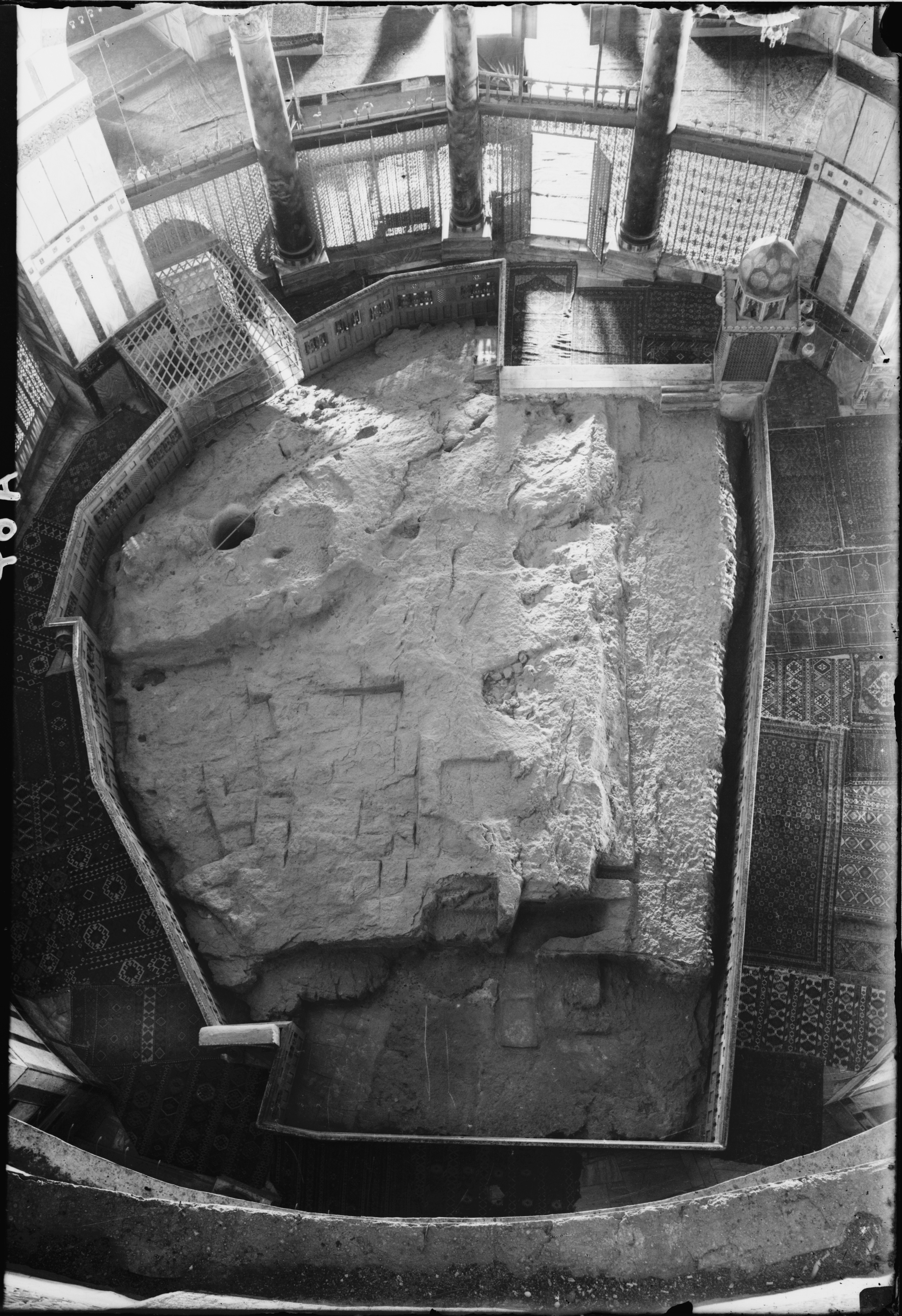
The Foundation Stone in the floor of the Dome of the Rock shrine in Jerusalem. The round hole at upper left penetrates to a small cave, known as the Well of Souls, below. The cage-like structure just beyond the hole covers the stairway entrance to the cave (south is towards the top of the image).

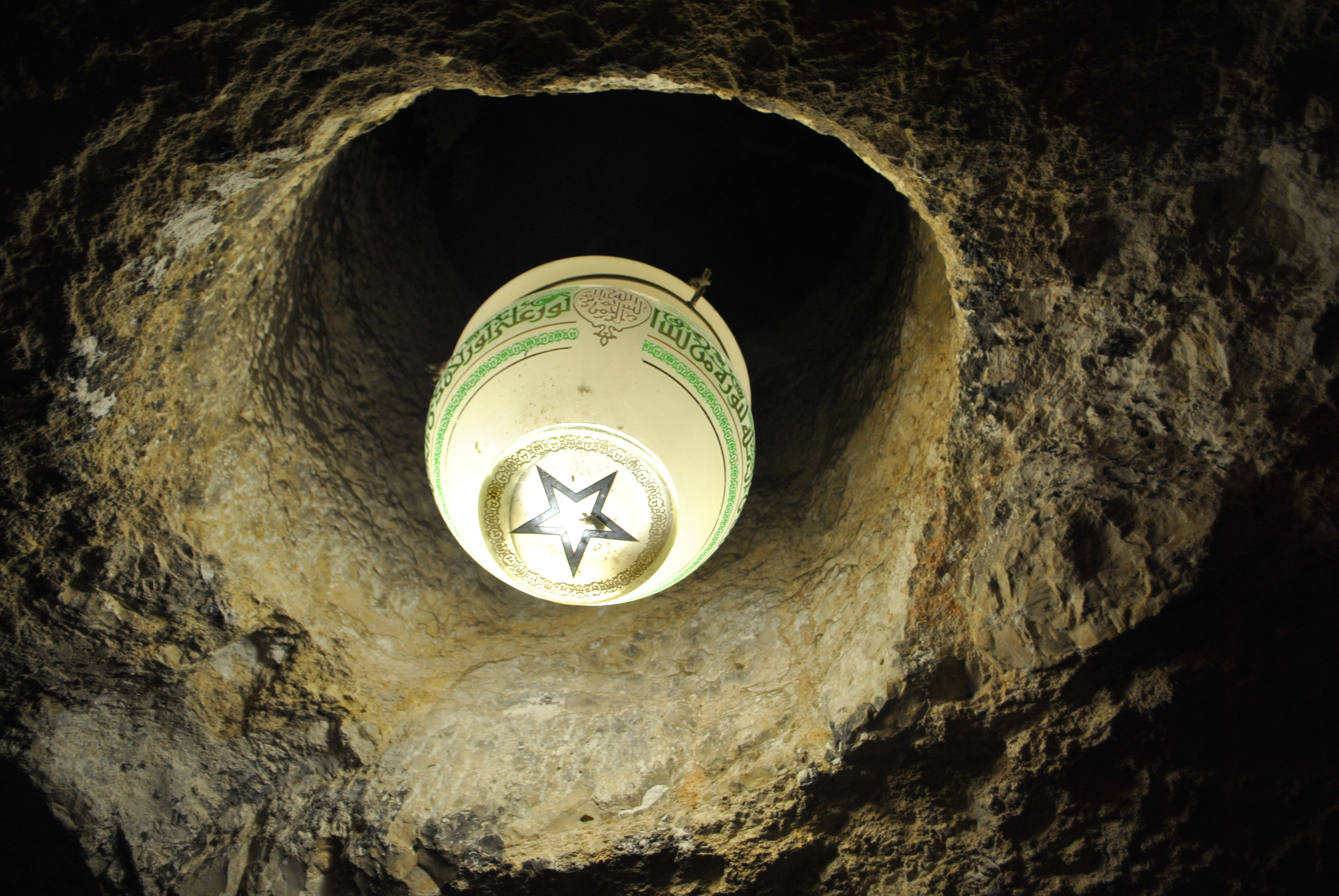
The bottom of the Foundation Stone, photo taken from the Well of Souls

The Foundation Stone (Hebrew: אֶבֶן הַשְּׁתִיָּה, romanized: ʾEḇen haŠeṯīyyā), or the Noble Rock (Arabic: الصخرة المشرفة, romanized: al-Saḵrah al-Mušarrafah), is the rock at the center of the Dome of the Rock in Jerusalem. It is also known as the Pierced Stone because it has a small hole on the southeastern corner that enters a cavern beneath the rock known as the Well of Souls.

Traditional Jewish sources mention the stone as the place from which the creation of the world began. Classical Jewish sources also identify its location with that of the Holy of Holies.

== Location ==
The rock is located towards the centre of the Temple Mount, at the top of Jerusalem's Old City southern hill. The current shape is the result of an expansion by Herod the Great on top of vaults over a summit called Mount Moriah which three millennia ago was the highest elevation in early Jerusalem's proximity to the City of David.

Early Muslim writings argue that the Dome of the Rock, completed in 691, is the site of the Holy of Holies and therefore the location of the Foundation Stone. The history by the 9th-century writer al-Tabari has Kaʿb al-Aḥbār, a Jewish convert to Islam, asking the caliph Umar to build a mosque over the rock, to which Umar responds, "O Ka'b, you are imitating the Jewish religion!" Al-Tabari then identifies the rock with the place where the Romans had "buried the temple (bayt al-maqdis) at the time of the sons of Israel." Pirqe de-Rabbi Eliezer (9th century) also wrote: "Rabbi Ishmael said: In the future, the sons of Ishmael (the Arabs) will do fifteen things in the Land of Israel [...] They will fence in the breaches of the walls of the Temple and construct a building on the site of the sanctuary."

Jewish sources have debated the precise location of the rock. Benjamin of Tudela wrote (c. 1170) that the site was in front of the Dome, on the site of the Western Wall. The Travels of Petachia of Ratisbon, c. 1180, and Travels of a Student of the Ramban (c. 1400) state that "on the Temple Mount stands a beautiful sanctuary which an Arab king built long ago, over the place of the Temple sanctuary and courtyard." Obadiah Bartenura says in a 1488 letter from Jerusalem that "I sought the Foundation Stone [which marks] the former place of the Ark of the Covenant, and many told me that it is beneath a tall and beautiful dome which the Arabs built in the Temple, but the space beneath this dome is secured, such that no man may come to it, viz. to the place of the Foundation Stone, for the dome is very large." David ben Solomon ibn Abi Zimra was convinced (c. 1570) that "under the dome [on the Temple Mount] – there is the Foundation Stone, undoubtedly – which the Arabs call al-Sakrah".

Other sources, operating under the belief that the Southern Wall of the Temple Mount as it stood in their time was the Southern Wall of the Biblical era, argued that the measurements given in the Talmud do not reconcile. The Holy of Holies ends up being too far north and they therefore locate the Foundation Stone as being directly opposite the current exposed section of the Western Wall, where no building currently stands. This is the view of Isaac Luria and the Maharsha, who state the prophecy that "Zion will become a ploughed field" indicates that no dwelling will be established there until the time of the Redemption. It therefore follows that the footprint of the Temple courtyard and Holy of Holies is situated in the unbuilt area between the Dome of the Rock and al-Aqsa Mosque.

Some believe the position is north of the Dome of the Rock, opposite the Gate of Mercy, which Immanuel Hai Ricchi identifies as the Shushan Gate mentioned in the Talmud. This gate was described as being opposite the opening of the sanctuary.

Modern Jewish academics list four possible locations of the Foundation Stone:

1. The stone that was located beneath the Ark of the Covenant is the one under the Dome of the Rock.
2. The stone that was located beneath the altar is now the one that is under the Dome of the Rock.
3. The stone that was located beneath the Ark of the Covenant is now near El Kas fountain to the South of the Dome of the Rock.
4. The stone that was located beneath the Ark of the Covenant is now inside the Spirits Dome situated to the north of the Dome of the Rock.

== Description ==
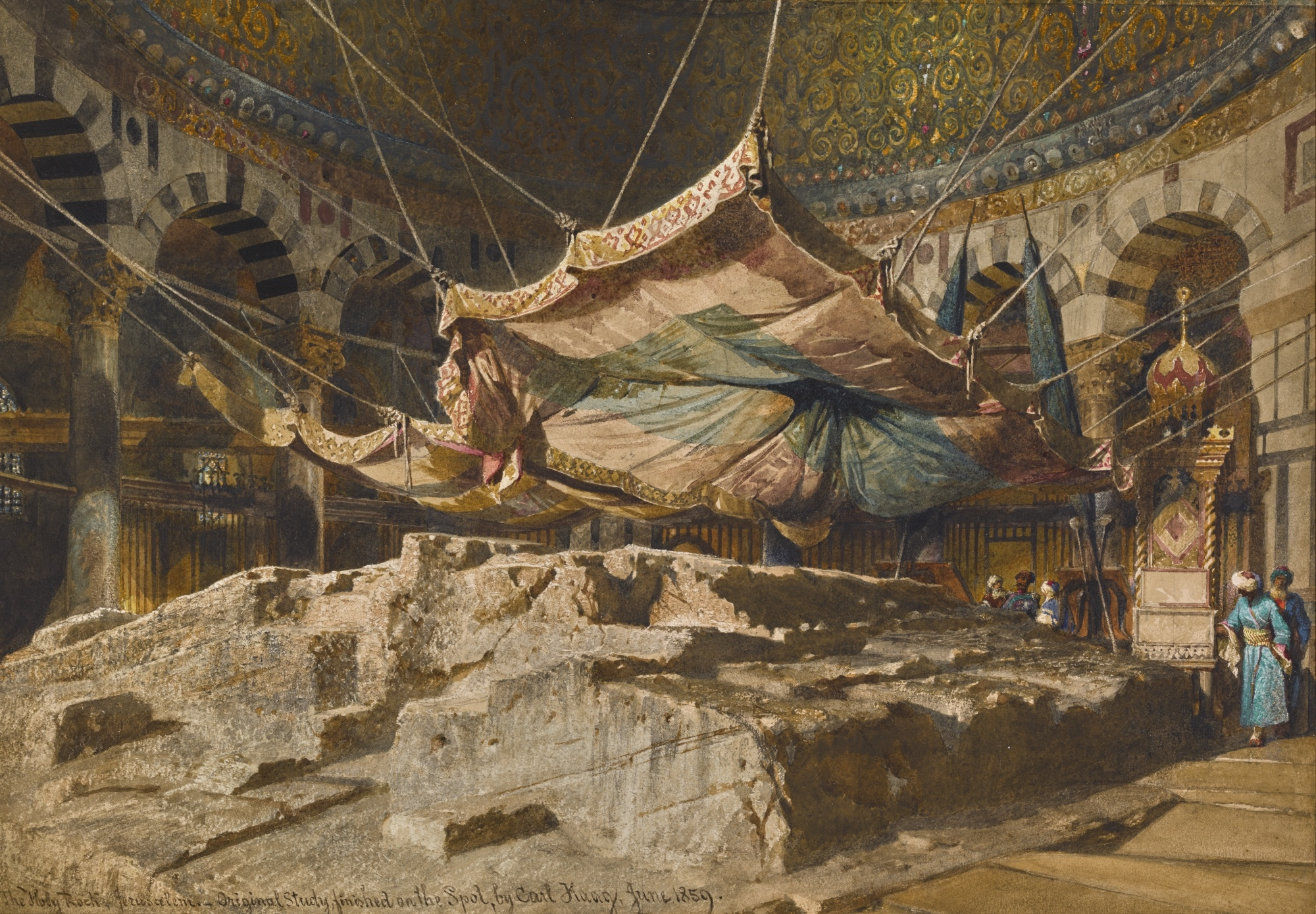
1859 watercolor of the Foundation Stone by Carl Haag

Although the rock is part of the surrounding 90 million-year-old, Upper Turonian Stage, Late Cretaceous karsted limestone, the southern side forms a ledge, with a gap between it and the surrounding ground; a set of steps currently uses this gap to provide access from the Dome of the Rock to the Well of Souls beneath it.

Archaeologist Leen Ritmeyer reported that there are sections of the rock cut completely flat, which north-to-south have a width of 6 cubits, precisely the width that the Mishnah credits to the wall of the Holy of Holies. According to Ritmeyer, a rectangular rock-cutting he discovered on the Foundation Stone marks the location where the Ark of the Covenant stood within the Holy of Holies. Ritmeyer's analysis was welcomed among biblical archeologists; however, scholars stated that this theory cannot be actually verified.

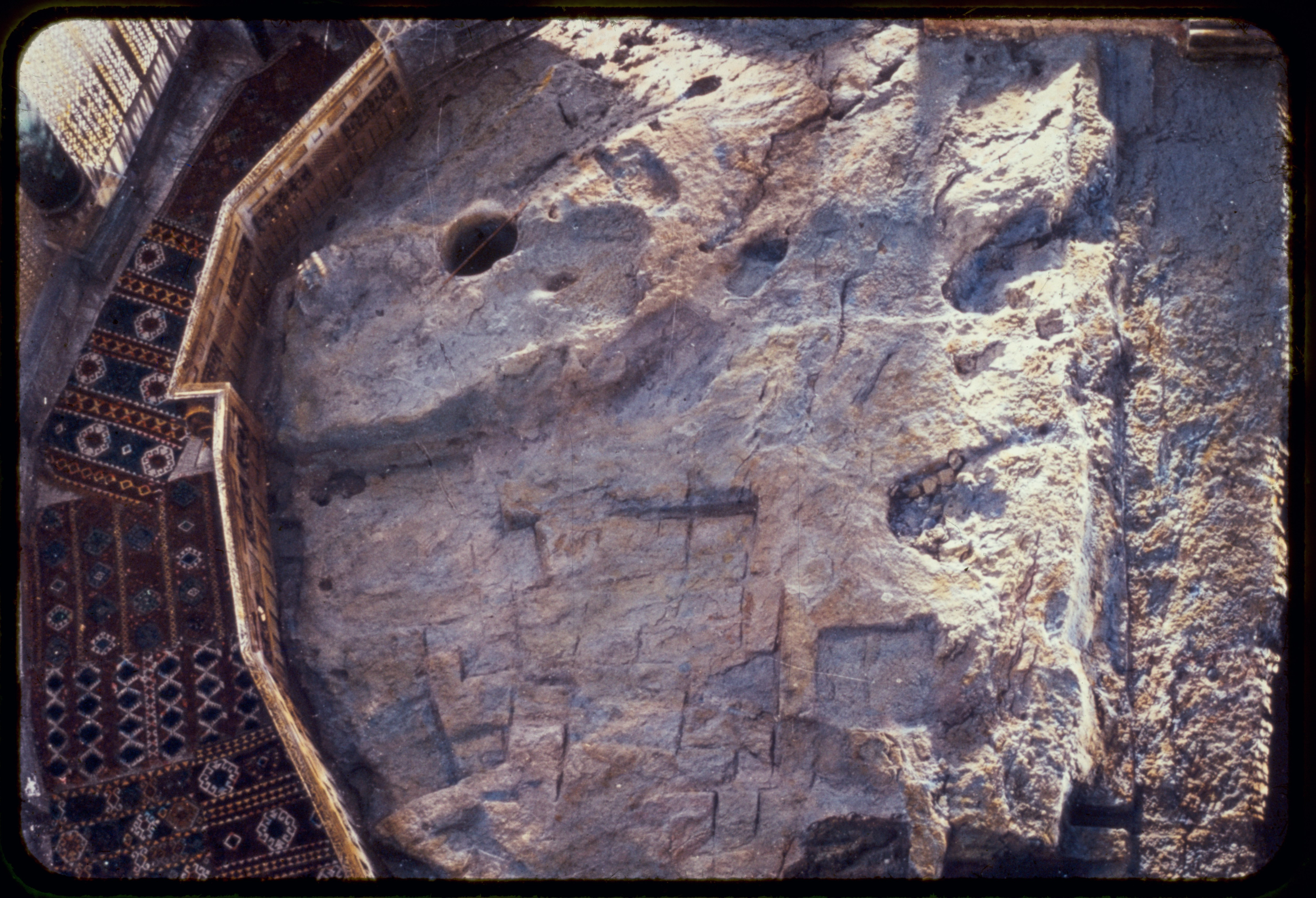
Picture of the Foundation Stone taken in the second half of the 20th century

The rock has several artificial cuts in its surface generally attributed to the Crusaders, whose frequent damage to the rock was so severe that the Christian kings of Jerusalem placed a protective marble slab over the rock. The marble slab was removed after Jerusalem had been taken over by Saladin in 1187.

Measuring the flat surface as the position of the southern wall of a square enclosure, the west and north sides of which are formed by the low clean-cut scarp at these edges of the rock, at the position of the hypothetical centre is a rectangular cut in the rock that is about 2.5 cubits (min. 120.4 cm SI) long and 1.5 cubits (min. 72.24 cm SI) wide, which are the dimensions of the Ark of the Covenant (according to the Book of Exodus).

The Mishnah gives the height of the rock as three thumb-breadths (min. 6 cm SI) above the ground. Radbaz discusses the apparent contradiction of the Mishnah's measurements and the actual measurement of the rock within the Dome he estimates as a "height of two men" above the ground. He concluded that many changes in the natural configuration of the Temple Mount have taken place which can be attributed to excavations made by the various occupiers of Jerusalem since the Second Temple construction.

== Jewish significance ==
The Mishnah in tractate Yoma mentions a stone situated in the Holy of Holies that was called Shetiya and had been revealed by the early prophets (i.e. David and Samuel).

An early Christian source noting Jewish attachment to the rock may be found in the Itinerarium Burdigalense, written between 333 and 334 CE when Jerusalem was under Roman rule, which describes a "perforated stone to which the Jews come every year and anoint it, bewail themselves with groans, rend their garments, and so depart."

According to the sages of the Talmud, it was from this rock that the world was created, itself being the first part of the Earth to come into existence. According to the Talmud, it was close to the Foundation Stone, on the site of the altar, that God gathered the earth that was formed into Adam. It was on this rock that Adam—and later Cain and Abel and Noah—offered sacrifices to God. Jewish sources identify this rock as the place of the Binding of Isaac mentioned in the Bible, where Abraham fulfilled God's test to see if he would be willing to sacrifice his son. The mountain is identified as Moriah in Genesis 22. It is also identified as the rock upon which Jacob dreamt about angels ascending and descending on a ladder and consequently consecrating and offering a sacrifice upon.

The Roman-era midrash Tanhuma sums up the centrality of and holiness of the site in Judaism:

As the navel is set in the centre of the human body,
so is the land of Israel the navel of the world...
situated in the centre of the world,
and Jerusalem in the centre of the land of Israel,
and the sanctuary in the centre of Jerusalem,
and the holy place in the centre of the sanctuary,
and the ark in the centre of the holy place,
and the Foundation Stone before the holy place,
because from it the world was founded.

When, according to the Bible, King David purchased a threshing floor owned by Araunah the Jebusite, it is believed that it was upon this rock that he offered the sacrifice mentioned in the verse. He wanted to construct a permanent temple there, but as his hands were "bloodied", he was forbidden to do so himself. The task was left to his son Solomon, who completed the Temple in c. 950 BCE.

Toledot Yeshu reports that "It was called Shetiyya because God placed it there (שת אותה יה; cf. Zohar, Vayechi 43), and this is the stone which Jacob libated with wine. On it were written the letters of the Explicit Name, and anyone who knew them could perform magic to his heart's desire. The Sages feared lest youths obtain the Name and destroy the world, so they set two iron hounds at the gate, which would bark at any comer to cause him to forget what he had learned. In the words of the Zohar, "The world was not created until God took a stone called Even haShetiya and threw it into the depths where it was fixed from above till below, and from it the world expanded. It is the centre point of the world and on this spot stood the Holy of Holies."

=== Role in the Temple ===
Situated inside the Holy of Holies, the Foundation Stone is believed to have been the rock upon which the Ark of the Covenant was placed in Solomon's Temple. During the Second Temple period when the Ark of the Covenant was not present, the stone was used by the High Priest who offered up the incense and sprinkled the blood of the sacrifices on it during the annual Yom Kippur service.

=== Commemoration in Jewish law ===
The Jerusalem Talmud states:

Women are accustomed not to prepare or attach warp threads to a weaving loom from Rosh Chodesh Av onwards (till after Tisha B'Av), because during the month of Av the Foundation Stone [and the Temple] was destroyed.

Citing this, the Mishnah Berurah rules that not only are women not to prepare or attach warp threads to a weaving loom, but it is forbidden for anyone to make, buy or wear new clothes or shoes from the beginning of the week in which Tisha B'Av falls until after the fast, and that people should ideally not do so from the beginning of Av. This period is known as The Nine Days.

In further commemoration of the Foundation Stone, it is also forbidden to eat meat or drink wine from the beginning of the week in which Tisha B'av falls until after the fast. Some have the custom to refrain from these foodstuffs from Rosh Chodesh Av, while others do so from the Seventeenth of Tammuz.

=== Liturgical references ===
In the days when Selichot are recited, in the days leading up to Rosh Hashanah until Yom Kippur, the supplications include the following references:

טענתנו גפי קרת נתונים, ישבתנו שן סלע איתנים

Translation:

You carried us and placed us on the [Holy] City's height, You settled us on the Patriarch's rocky peak.

רבוצה עליו אבן שתית חטובים ...שמה בתוך לפני מזיב מאשנבים

Translation:

Upon it lying the stone from which the foundation was hewn... Who gives ear from which the waters flow [i.e. the foundation stone "from which flow all the waters of the world"].

During Sukkot, the following references to the Foundation Stone are mentioned in the Hoshanot recital:

הושענא! – אבן שתיה – הושענא

Translation:

Please save! – Foundation Stone – Please save!

הושענא! – תאדרנו באבן תלולה – הושענא

Translation:

Please save! – Adorn us with the elevated Stone – Please save!

== Islamic significance ==
The Masjid al-Haram in Mecca, is the place according to the Quran from where Muslims believe Muhammad began his Night Journey and Ascension, the miraculous journey from Al-Masjid al-Haram in Mecca to Al-Masjid al-Aqsa in Jerusalem. The qibla (direction of prayer) was still toward Al-Masjid al-Aqsa in Jerusalem. The rock is revered but not worshipped. So the dome marks and protects a site connected to one of Islam’s most important spiritual narratives. To Muslims, the Dome of the Rock in Al Haram Al Sharif/Noble Sanctuary in Jerusalem is honored because of its connection to sacred events, not because the rock possesses divine power.

Tawfiq Canaan, in 1922, recorded a local tradition that describes four living waters flowing from under the rock. To the south: Hammam esh-Shifa, to the east: Siloam, to the north: 'En Haddji and En Qashleh, and to the west: Hammam es-Sultan.

The Umayyad caliph Abd al-Malik commissioned the Dome of the Rock in Jerusalem, which was completed in 691–692 CE. The building was constructed as a monumental shrine centered on the prominent rock at the heart of the Temple Mount, a site with longstanding religious significance.

== See also ==
- List of individual rocks
- Axis mundi
- Black Stone
- Jerusalem in Islam
- Jerusalem in Judaism
- Mount Gerizim
- Baetylus
