= Dome of the Spirits =

Islamic building in Al-Aqsa, Jerusalem

Coordinates: 31°46′43.59″N 35°14′05.52″E

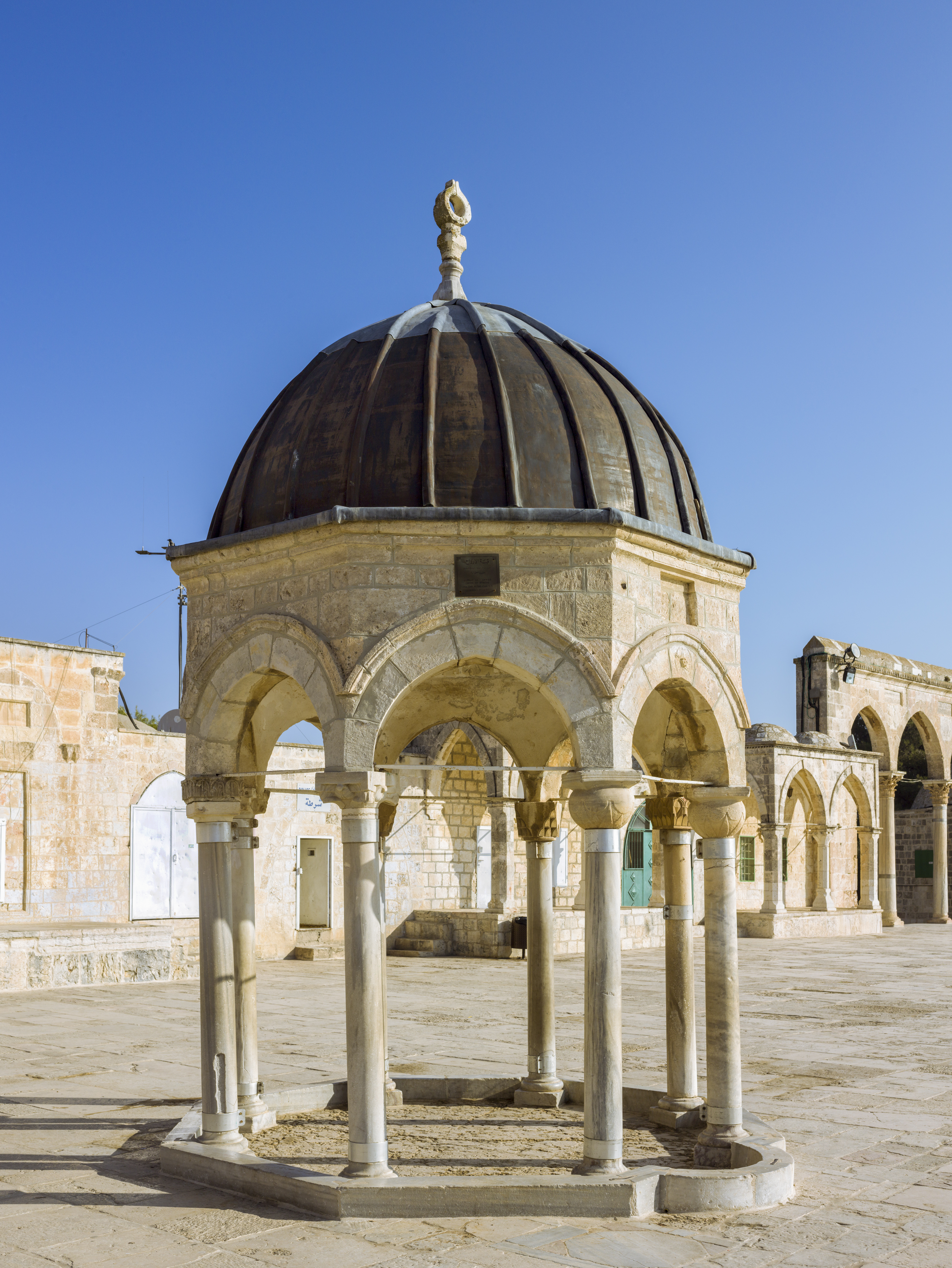
Dome of the spirits

The Dome of the Spirits (Arabic: قبة الأرواح, romanized: Ḳubbat al-Arwāḥ) is a small dome resting on an octagonal base, located on the Temple Mount, in the Old City of Jerusalem.

Several theories exist concerning the name of this building; it could be associated with the proximity of the cave of the spirits or according to a legend, the souls of the dead will be gathered there for prayers.

Its other name, Dome of the Tablets, comes from the Tablets of Stone, which were said to be kept in the Ark of the Covenant.

It was built in the tenth century.

== Structure and location ==
The Dome of the Spirits is a small octagonal dome located on the Dome of the Rock’s courtyard. It is based on eight marble columns attached to eight arches carrying the dome’s drum. This is a small dome resting on an octagonal base.

The Dome of the Sprits is located north-west of the Dome of the Rock (Kubbat al-Sakhra) and opposite of the Bab al-Rahmah (The Gate of Mercy) in al-Aqsa enclave. It is located close to the Dome of al-Khidr.

== History ==
It was probably built during Umayyad period because Ibn al-Faqih al-Hamadani (3-4H/9-10th century) in his Mukhtasar Kitab al-Buldan mentioned that there was a dome in al-Aqsa enclave called Kubbat Jibril (Dome of Gabriel). Then it was called Kubbat al-Ruh and Kubbat al-Arvah (Dome of the Spirits). It was probably rebuilt during the 10th century AH/16th century AC during the Ottoman period.

== Name ==
Several theories exist concerning the name of this building. It was called the “Spirits Dome” because of its close location to a cave called the “Spirits Cave”. It could be associated with the proximity of the cave of the spirits or according to a legend, the souls of the dead will be gathered there for prayers. Its other name, the Dome of Tablets, comes from the tablets of the Stone, alleged kept in the Ark of the Covenant in Biblical tradition. The Dome of the Spirits stands above exposed bedrock on the “Temple Mount” in Jewish tradition and it is just a little lower the Foundation Stone, which is under the Dome of the Rock. Asher S. Kaufman takes the view that the Second Temple was located over the Dome of the Spirits; others disagree.
