= Carl Haag =

German painter

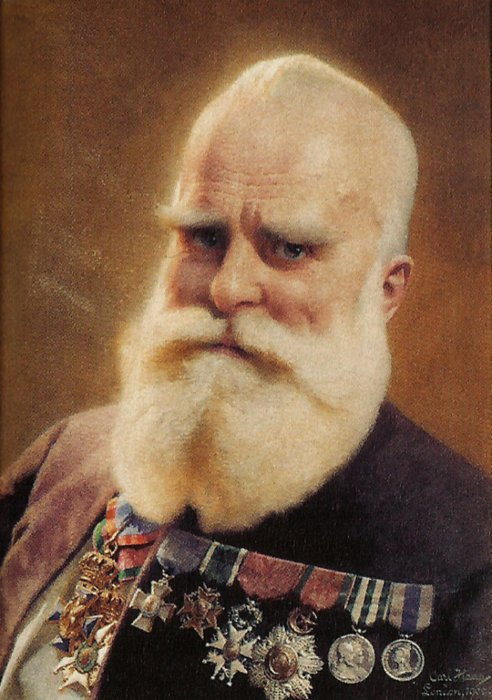
- Carl Haag, Self-Portrait, 1900
- Born: 20 April 1820; Erlangen, Kingdom of Bavaria
- Died: 24 January 1915 (aged 94); Oberwesel, German Empire
- Education: Academy of Fine Arts Nuremberg and Munich
- Known for: Painter, water-colourist
- Movement: Orientalist

Carl Haag (20 April 1820 – 24 January 1915) was a Bavarian-born painter who became a naturalized British subject and was court painter to the duke of Saxe-Coburg and Gotha.

== Biography ==
Haag was born in Erlangen, in the Kingdom of Bavaria, and was trained in the Academy of Fine Arts Nuremberg and at Munich. He initially practised as an illustrator and as a painter in oils of portraits and architectural subjects; but in 1847 he traveled to England, where he studied watercolour techniques at the Royal Academy Schools. After this, he devoted himself to watercolours.

In 1850, he was elected an associate of the Royal Society of Painters in Water Colours before becoming a full member in 1853. Haag specialised in mountain views, and in 1852 encountered Karl, Prince of Leiningen, and Ernest II, Duke of Saxe-Coburg-Gotha, on a sketching trip in Tyrol. The pair commissioned a Christmas gift for Queen Victoria, who later invited Haag to visit Balmoral in 1854 to chronicle their time on the estate. A large body of his work remains in the Royal Collection.

Between 1858 and 1860, he travelled to the Middle East, at first staying for more than a year in Cairo where he shared a studio with fellow artist Frederick Goodall. Later he journeyed to Palestine, Lebanon and Syria before returning to Cairo. During this period, he made many sketches which he worked up into paintings after returning to London. He returned to Egypt in 1873–74 to gather inspiration for further Oriental paintings.

In 1871, Haag bought the newly-built 7 Lyndhurst Road, Hampstead which he renamed Ida Villa in honour of his wife. He added a rooftop studio under a new double-pitched roof reached by a new octagonal staircase tower attached to the rear corner of the house. In this studio, he created an Eastern-themed interior with fittings, furniture, tapestries and rugs collected during his journeys.

He was a prolific and important painter of Holy Land scenes. He gained a considerable reputation for his firmly drawn and meticulously elaborated paintings of Eastern subjects. Some of his depictions of the Middle East are in the Israel Museum's collection. In 1903, he retired and towards the end of his life, Haag left England and returned to the newly united German Empire, where he died in Oberwesel.

== Selected works ==
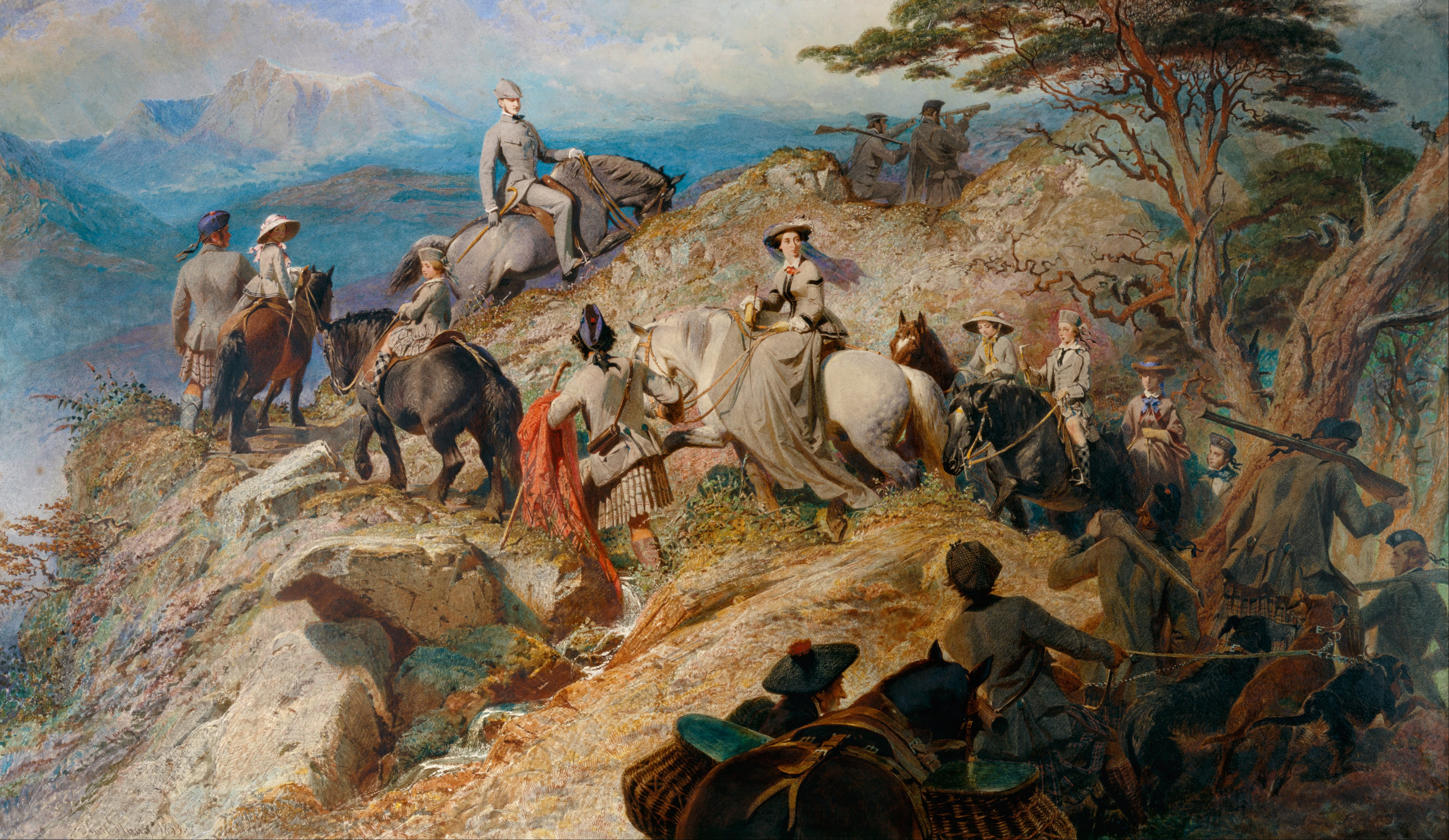
Carl Haag, Morning in the Highlands: the royal family ascending Lochnagar (1853)

- Evening in Balmoral
- The Sudden Shock in the Desert
- The Danger in the Desert
- The Ruins of Baalbek
- Panorama of Palmyra
- Beduin Devotion
- Ouposts in Montenegro
- Reading the Koran
- Morning in the Highlands
- Bachist, a Howazeen Bedawee and Mabzookh, his Little Son
- A Nubian harper
- Greek Warrior
- Abdullah, Chief of Said Pasha's Bodyguard
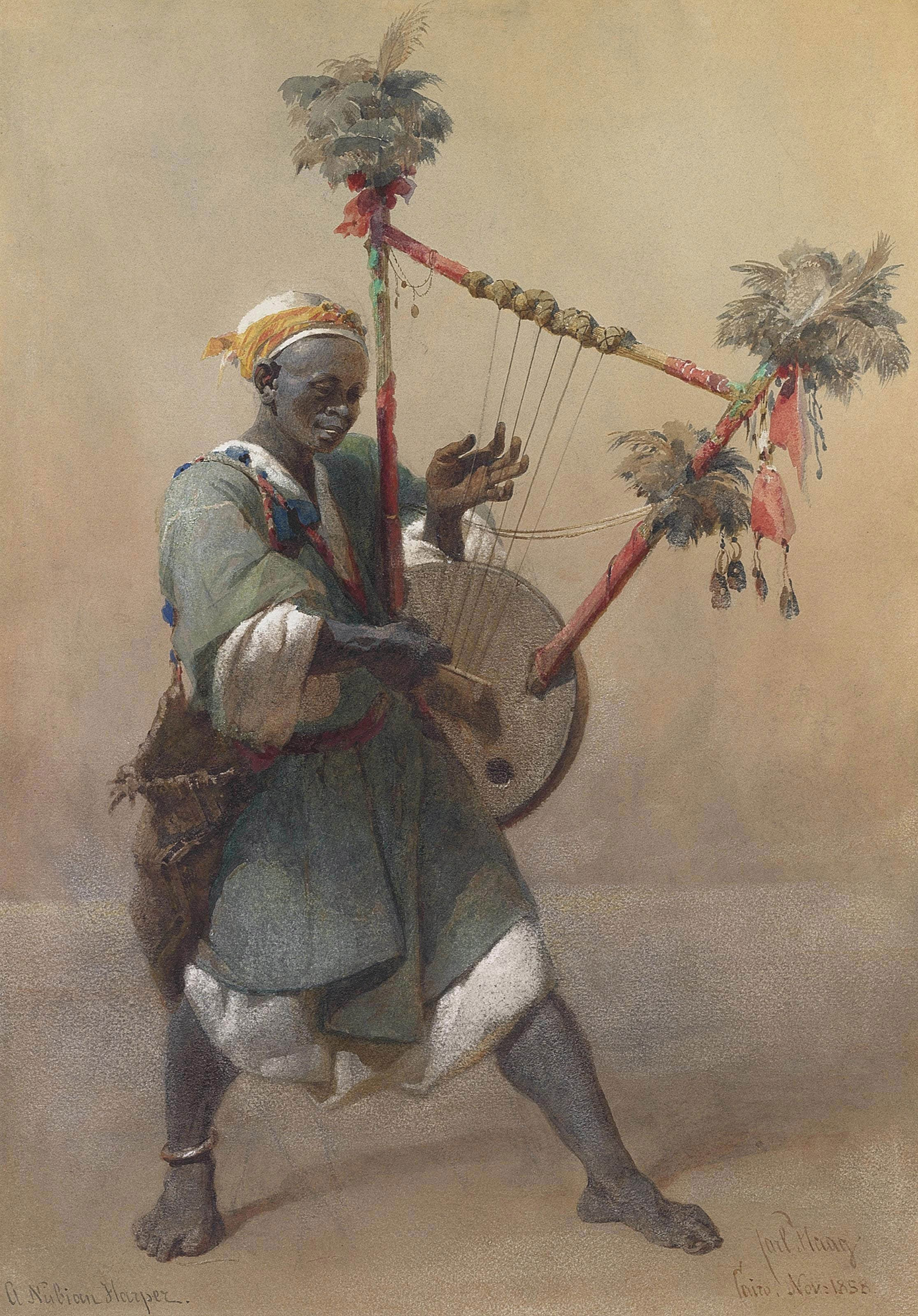
A Nubian harper (1858)

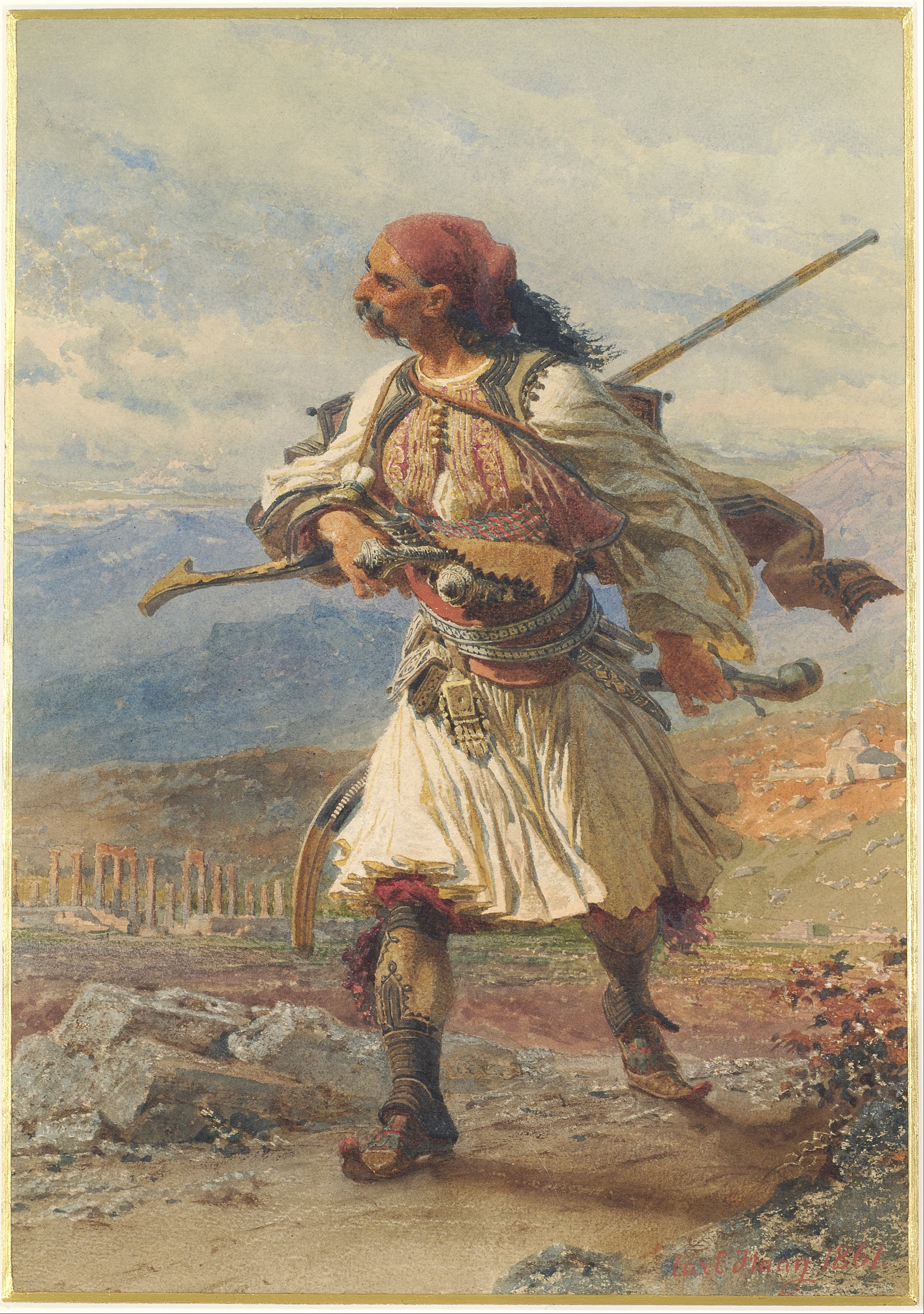
Greek Warrior (1861)

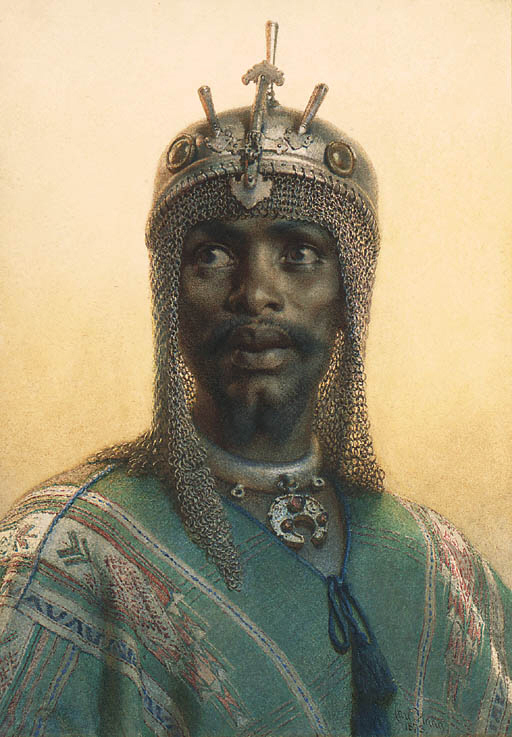
Abdullah, Chief of Said Pasha's Bodyguard (1873)

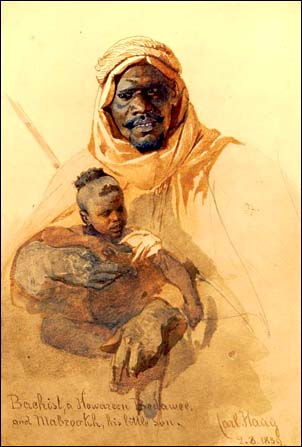
Bachist, a Howazeen Bedawee and Mabzookh, his Little Son (1857)

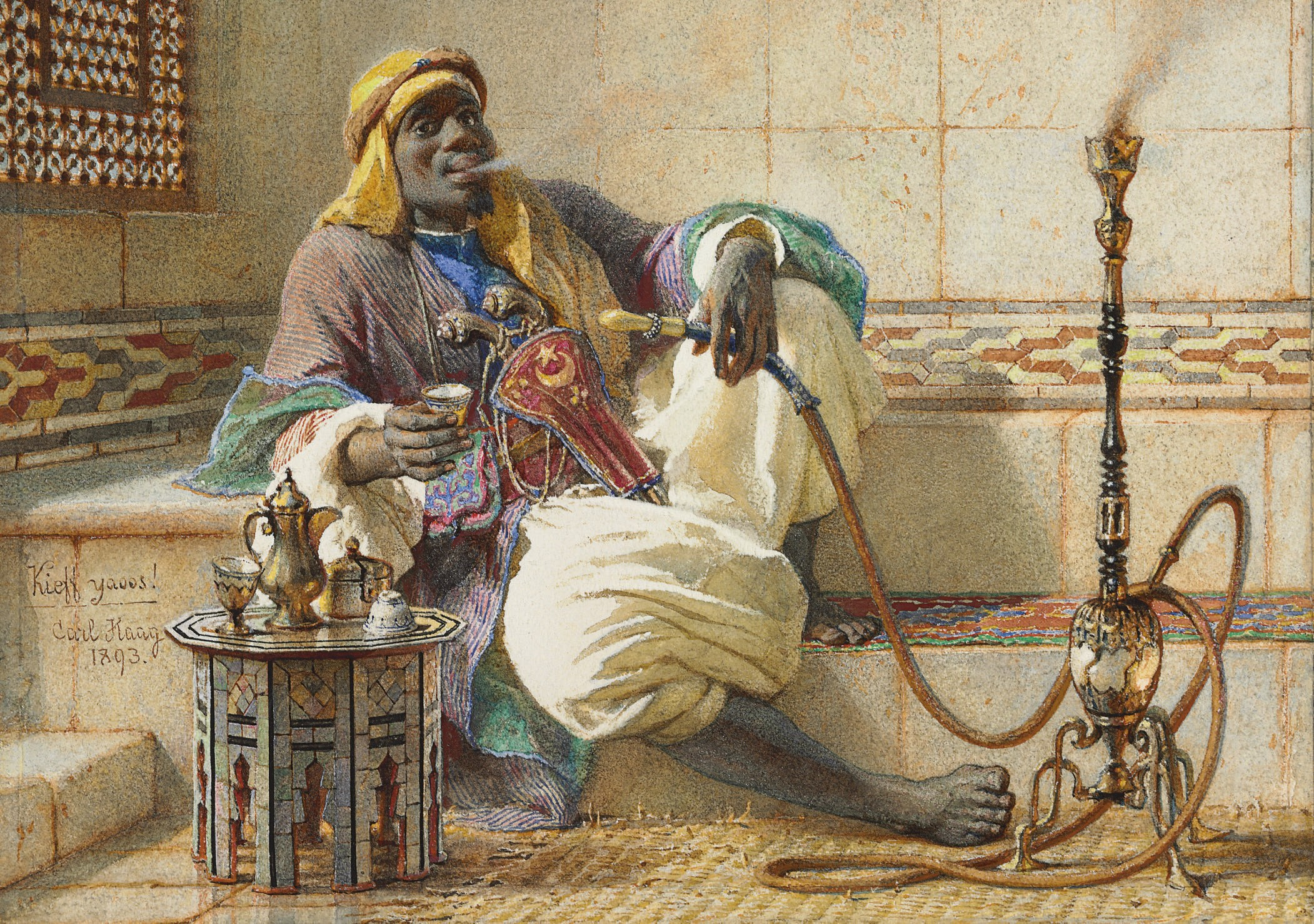
Kieff Yaous! (Rest is sweet!) (1893)

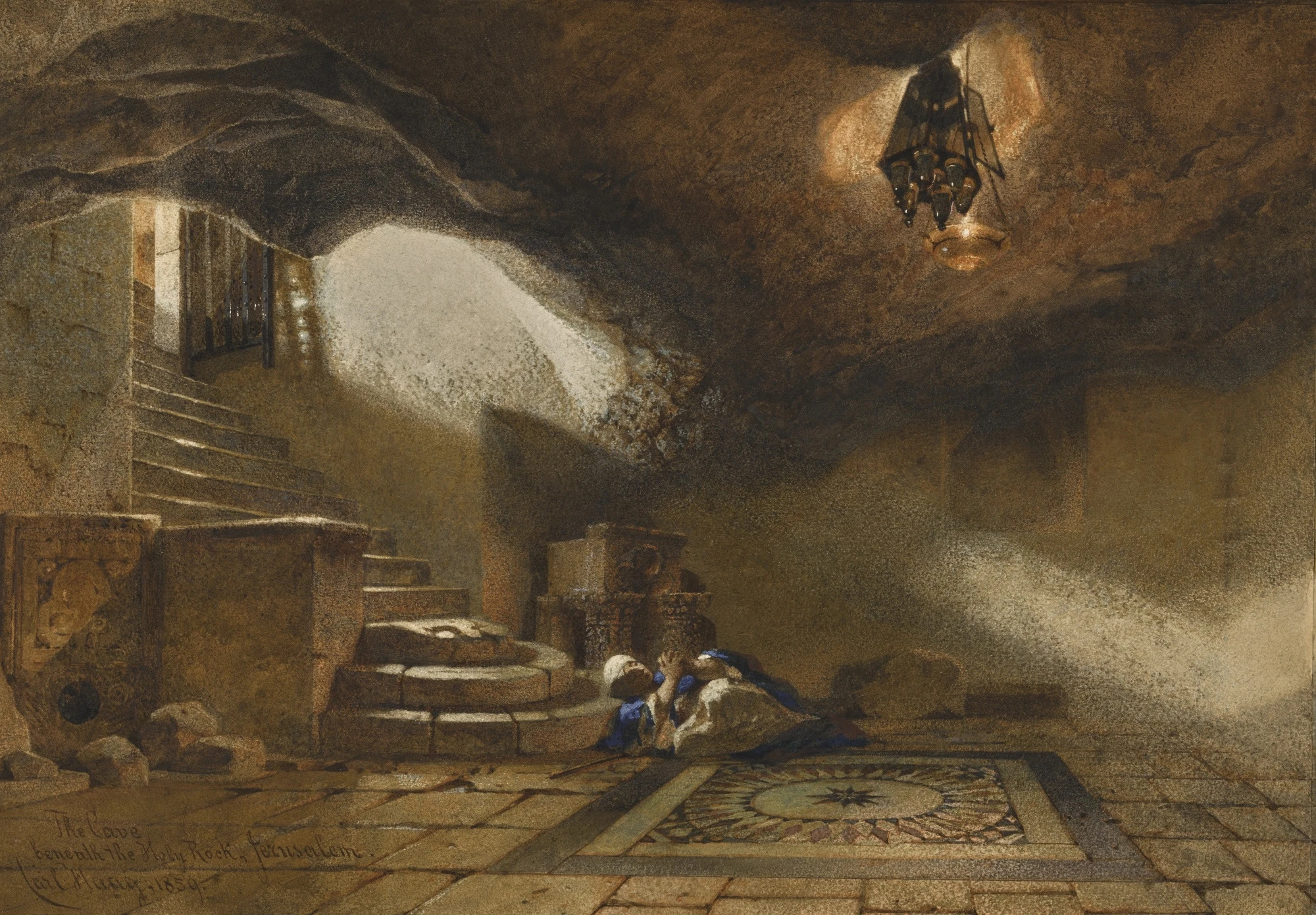
Well of Souls, Dome of the Rock, Jerusalem (1859)

== See also ==
- List of Orientalist artists
- Orientalism

== Sources ==
- This work in turn cites:
  - John Lewis Roget, A History of the Old Water-Colour Society, now the Royal Society of Painters in Water Colours (two volumes, London, 1891)
