= Well of Souls =

Cave beneath the Dome of the Rock in Jerusalem

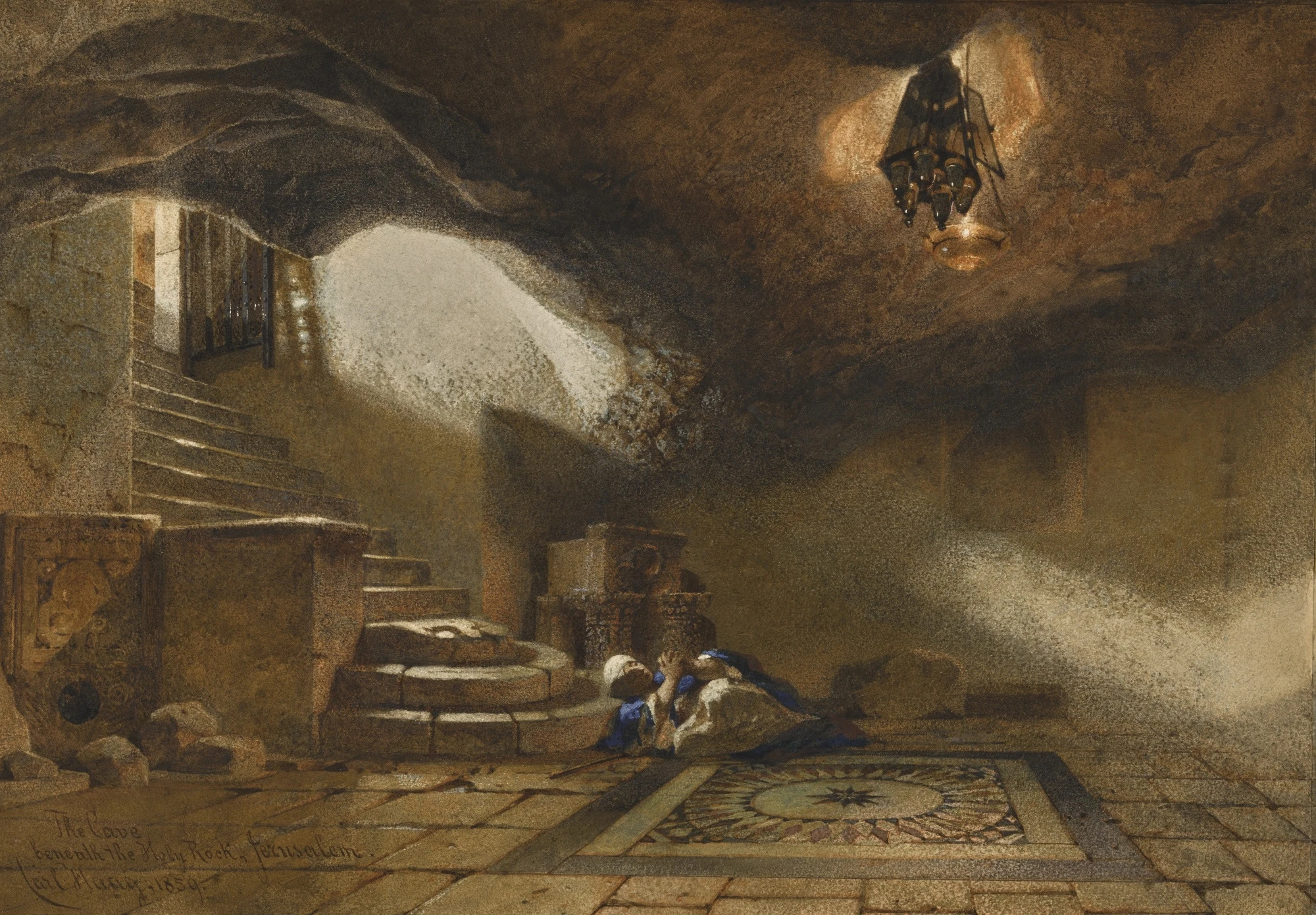
"The Cave beneath the Holy Rock, Jerusalem". Watercolor over pencil on paper, Carl Haag, 1859

The Well of Souls (Hebrew: בור הרוחות, romanized: Bor ha-Rukhot, Arabic: بئر الأرواح, romanized: Biʾr al-Arwaḥ; sometimes translated Pit of Souls, Cave of Spirits, or Well of Spirits) is a partly natural, partly man-made cave located inside the Foundation Stone ("Noble Rock" in Islam) under the Dome of the Rock shrine on the Temple Mount (Haram al-Sharif) in Jerusalem. During the Crusader period, it was known to Christians as the "Holy of Holies", referring to the inner sanctum of the former Jewish Temple, which, according to modern scholarship, was probably located on top of the Foundation Stone.

The name "Well of Souls" derives from a medieval Islamic legend that at this place the spirits of the dead can be heard awaiting Judgment Day, although this is not a mainstream view in Sunni Islam. The name has also been applied to a depression in the floor of this cave and a hypothetical chamber that may exist beneath it.

== History and context ==
=== Judaism and Islam ===
The Well of Souls is located under the Foundation Stone, an exposed bedrock which lies directly under the Dome of the Rock. The Dome of the Rock stands on the location of the destroyed Second Jewish Temple (built around 516 BCE to replace Solomon's Temple), which was destroyed by the Romans in 70 CE. In traditional Jewish sources, the Foundation Stone is considered the place from which the creation of the world began, and where Abraham prepared to sacrifice his son Isaac.

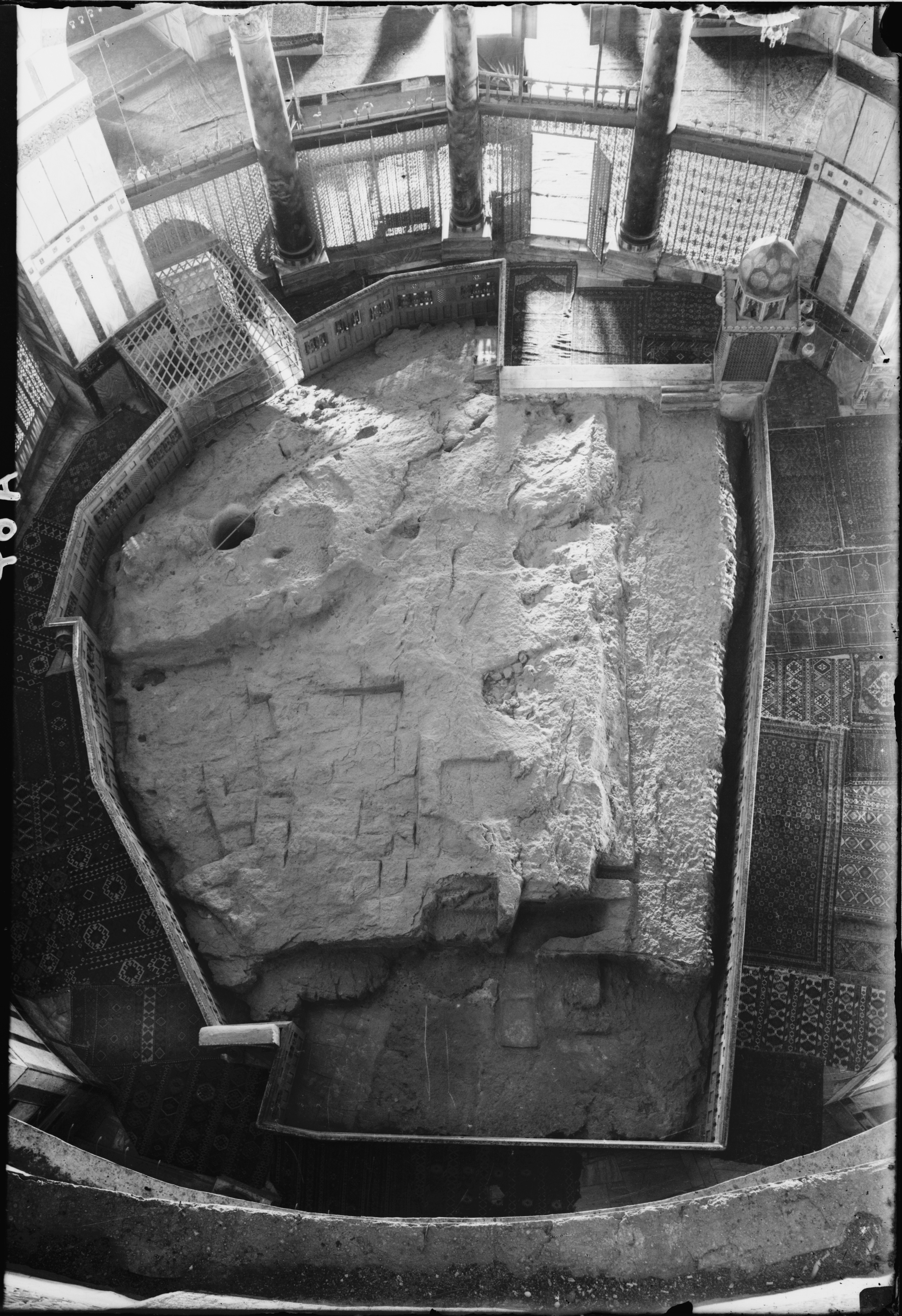
The Foundation Stone in the floor of the Dome of the Rock shrine in Jerusalem. The round hole at upper left penetrates to the Well of Souls below. The cage-like structure above the hole covers the stairway entrance to the cave.

In Islam, the Foundation Stone is known as the Noble Rock. Al-Tabari, a Muslim writer of the 9th century CE, identified the rock with the place where the Romans had "buried the temple [bayt al-maqdis] at the time of the sons of Israel." Some modern Muslims believe it to be the spot from which Muhammad ascended to heaven during his al-'Isrā' wal-Miʿrāj (Isra and Mi'raj, 'Night Journey'). According to a medieval Islamic tradition, the Foundation Stone tried to follow Muhammad as he ascended, leaving his footprint here while pulling up and hollowing out the cave below. The impression of the hand of the Archangel Gabriel, made as he restrained the Stone from rising, is nearby.

Both Jewish and Muslim traditions relate to what may lie beneath the Foundation Stone, the earliest of them found in the Talmud in the former and understood to date to the 12th and 13th centuries in the latter. The Talmud indicates that the Stone marks the center of the world and serves as a cover for the Abyss (Abzu) containing the raging waters of the Flood. The cave was venerated as early as 902 according to Ibn al-Faqih. Muslim tradition likewise places it at the center of the world and over a bottomless pit with the flowing waters of Paradise underneath. A palm tree is said to grow out of the River of Paradise here to support the Stone. Noah is said to have landed here after the Flood. The souls of the dead are said to be audible here as they await the Last Judgment, although this is not a mainstream view in Sunni Islam.

=== Crusader period ===
The Foundation Stone and its cave entered fully into the Christian tradition after the Crusaders took Jerusalem in 1099. Crusaders converted the Dome of the Rock into a church, calling it in Latin: Templum Domini (the 'Temple of the Lord'). They made changes to the site at this time, including cutting away much of the rock to make staircases and paving the Stone over with marble slabs. The main entrance of the cave was enlarged, and Europeans of the Crusades are probably also responsible for creating the shaft ascending from the center of the chamber. The Crusaders called the cave the "Holy of Holies" and venerated it as the site of the archangel's announcement (Note: For the text, see Luke 1:8−16) of John the Baptist's birth. Modern scholarship indicates that the Holy of Holies of the Jewish Temple was probably on top of the Foundation Stone, not inside it.

== Legends and old interpretations ==
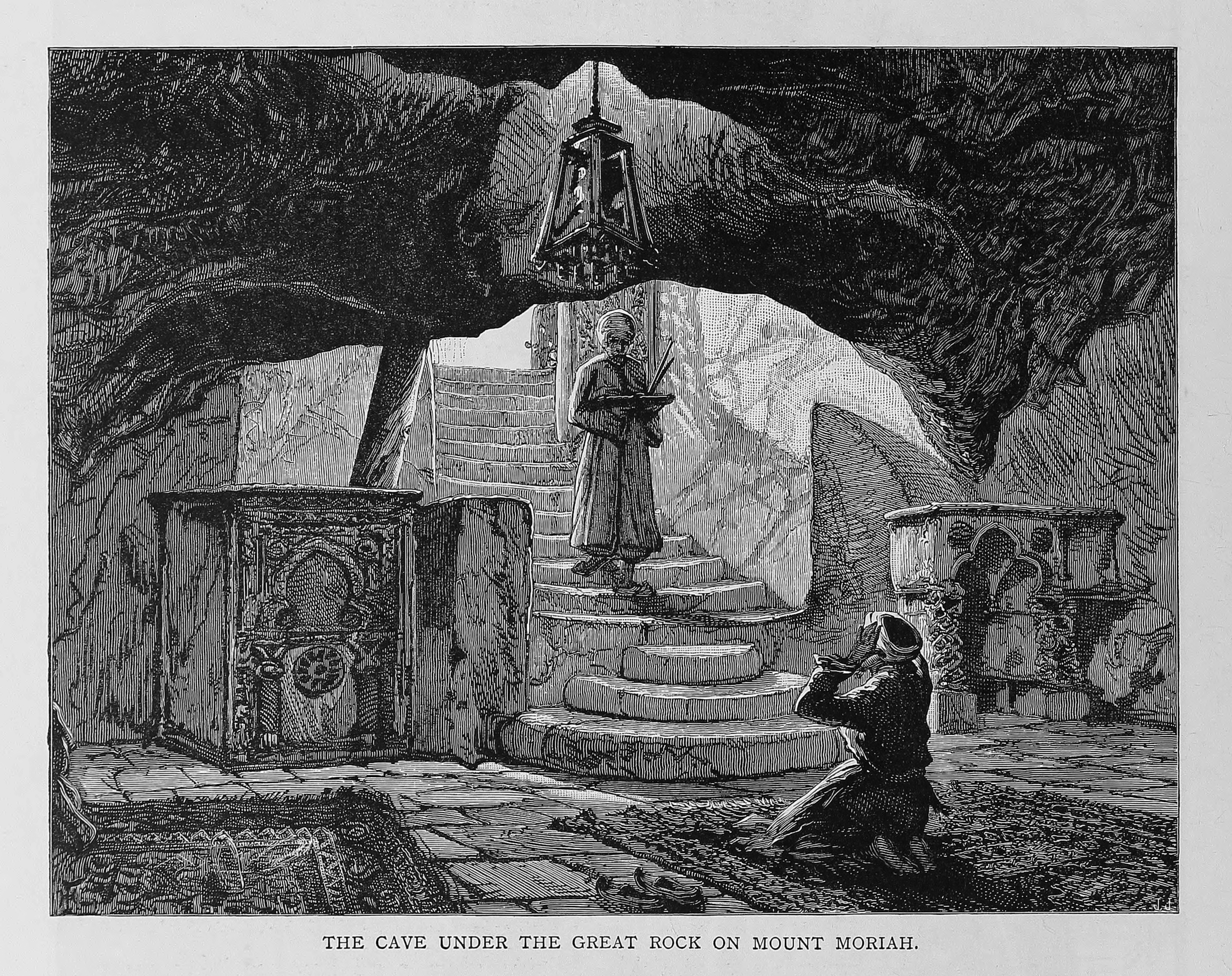
"The Cave Under the Great Rock on Mount Moriah" (illustration from Charles William Wilson's Picturesque Palestine, Sinai and Egypt, 1883)

In 1871, Jerusalem was visited by the explorer and Arabist Sir Richard Francis Burton. Burton's wife Isabel later described their exploration of the Well of Souls as tourists:

A flight of fifteen steps takes us into the cave under this Rock. This feature has been immensely written about. I shall content myself with saying that Captain Burton holds it to be the original granary of the corn threshed, or rather trodden out, upon the plain on either side, and winnowed from the Rock. If the latter prove to be the great Altar of Sacrifice, the cave will be the cistern for the blood which ran off by the Bir el Arwáh (Well of Souls) into the Valley of Hinnom. My husband did his best to procure the opening of the hollow-sounding slab in the centre, but the time has not yet come. The more ignorant Moslems believe that the Sakhrah is suspended in the air, and its only support is a palm tree, held by the mothers of the two greatest prophets, Mohammed and Abraham. The most projecting point is called "the Tongue," because, when Omar thought he had discovered the stone which was Jacob's pillar in his vision at Bethel, he exclaimed, "Es Salámo Alaykúm" ("Peace be unto thee"), and the stone replied, "Alaykúm us Salám, wa Rahmat-Ullahi" ("Peace be to thee, and the mercy of God"). The Shaykhs of the Mosque explained everything to us, even the minutest trifle, and showed us the places where Solomon prayed, and also David, and where Abraham and Elijah and Mohammed met on the occasion of his night flight upon El Borák. They also made an echo for us, and told us that there was a hollow place beneath the Bir el Arwáh before mentioned, where every Friday the departed souls come to adore Allah.

== Description ==
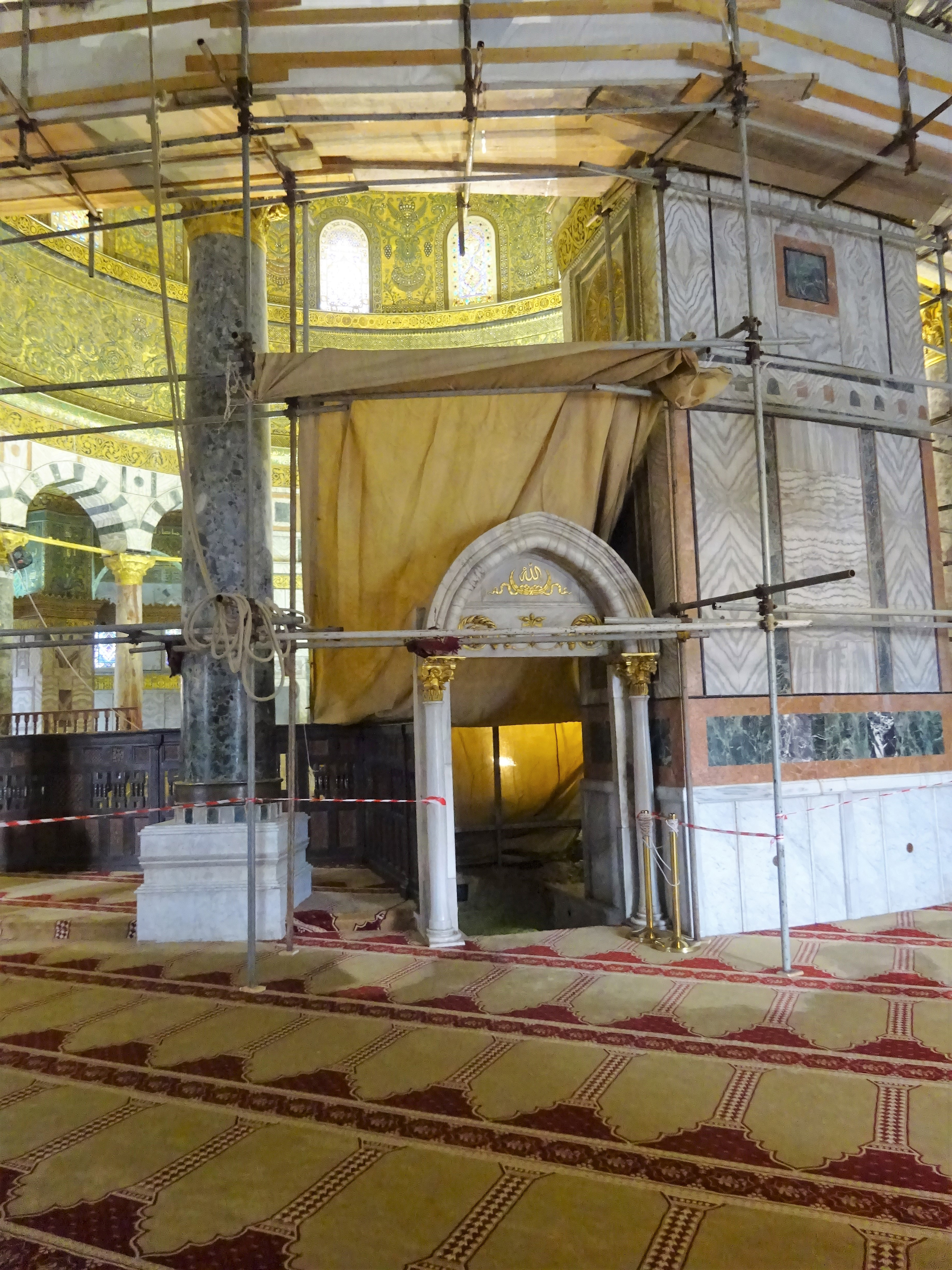
Entrance to the Well of Souls in the Dome of the Rock, 2018

=== The entrance ===
The entrance to the cave is at the southeast angle of the Foundation Stone, beside the southeast pier of the Dome of the Rock shrine. Here a set of 16 new marble steps descend through a cut passage thought to date to Crusader times. On the way down, bedrock masses project in towards the stair; the one to the right is called "the tongue". (According to legend, the Stone answered 'Caliph 'Umar I' when he addressed it.)

=== The chamber ===
The cave chamber is roughly square, about 6 meters (20 ft) on a side, and ranges from around 1.5 to 2.5 meters (4 ft 11 in to 8 ft 2 in) high.

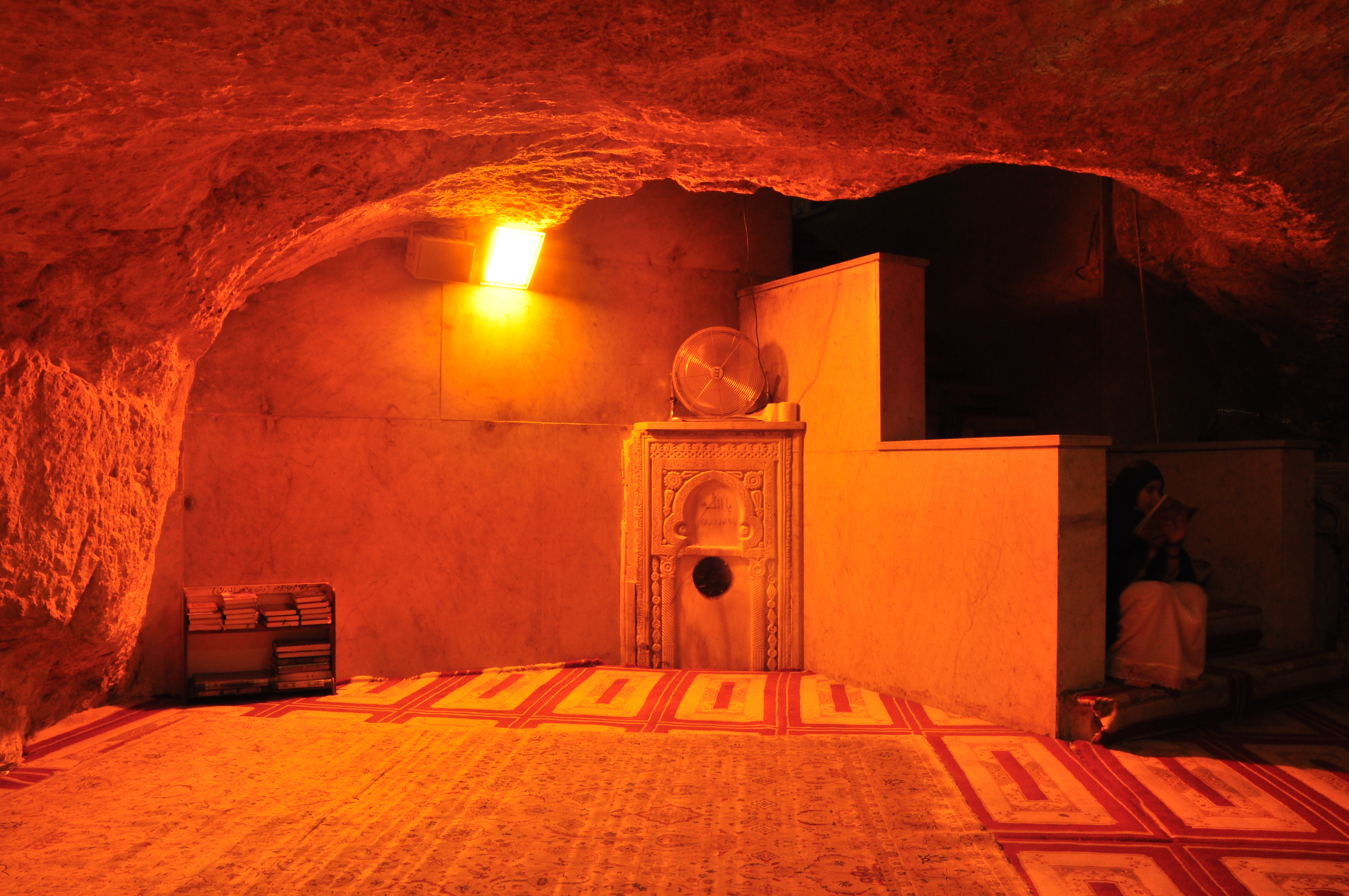
The Mihrab of Suleiman

Inside the chamber are four prayer niches. As one descends, next to the staircase there are two mihrabs (prayer niches): to the left (south) is one dedicated to Prophet Dawud (David), with a trefoil arch supported by miniature marble twisted-rope columns. To the right (southeast) is a shallower, but ornately decorated, prayer niche dedicated to the prophet Suleiman (Solomon). This mihrab is certainly one of the oldest in the world, considered to date at least to the late 9th century, with some even suggesting that it dates back to the 7th century and to the time of Abd al-Malik, builder of the Dome of the Rock—making it the oldest in the world—but this is disputed. To the north is a small shrine dedicated to prophet Ibrahim (Abraham) and to the northwest another one dedicated to Khidr-Elijah. A depression in the floor of the cave elicits an echo, which may indicate a chamber beneath it.

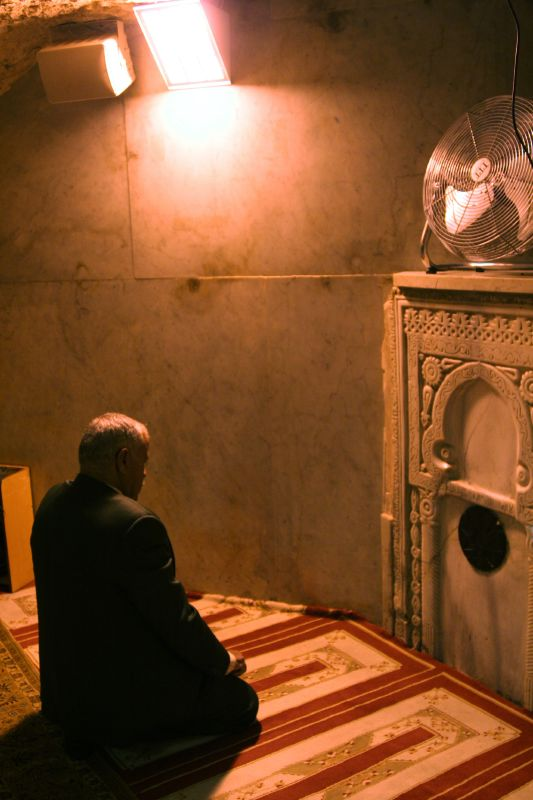
A man prays towards the mihrab of Suleiman in the chamber

The chamber is supplied with electric lighting and fans.

=== The shaft ===
At the center of the ceiling is a shaft, 0.46 meters (1 ft 6 in) in diameter, which penetrates 1.7 meters (5 ft 7 in) up to the surface of the Stone above. It has been proposed that this is the 4,000-year-old remnant of a shaft tomb. Another theory is that it represents a Crusader "chimney" cut for ventilation to accommodate lighted shrine candles. Still others have tried to make a case that it was part of a drainage system for the blood of sacrifices from the Temple altar. There are no rope marks within the shaft, so it has been concluded that it was never used as a well, with the cave as a cistern. The ceiling of the cave appears natural, while the floor has been long ago paved with marble and carpeted over.

== Literature ==
- The earliest reference to a "pierced rock" (the shaft in the cave's roof) may be that in the Itinerarium Burdigalense by the anonymous "Pilgrim of Bordeaux" who visited Jerusalem in 333 CE.
- References to the "Well of Souls" under the Foundation Stone date at least to the 10th-century Persian writer Ibn al-Faqih who mentions it as an Islamic sacred site.
- The 11th-century Persian writer and traveler Nasir-i Khusraw related the traditional story of the origin of the cave in his classic travelogue Safarnama:
  They say that on the night of his Ascension into heaven, the Prophet, prayed first at the Dome of the Rock, laying his hand upon the Rock. As he went out, the Rock, to do him honour, rose up, but he laid his hand on it to keep it in its place and firmly fixed it there. But by reason of this rising up, it is even to this present day partly detached from the ground beneath.
- The 16th-century rabbi David ben Solomon ibn Abi Zimra said there was a cave under the Dome of the Rock called the "Well of Souls".
