= Saint Stephen's Gate =

Saint Stephen's Gate may refer to either of two gates of Jerusalem:

- Damascus Gate prior to the 14th century
- Lions' Gate since the 14th century
