= Jerusalem Indian War Cemetery =

Cemetery in Jerusalem for Indian World War I soldiers

- Commonwealth War Graves Commission
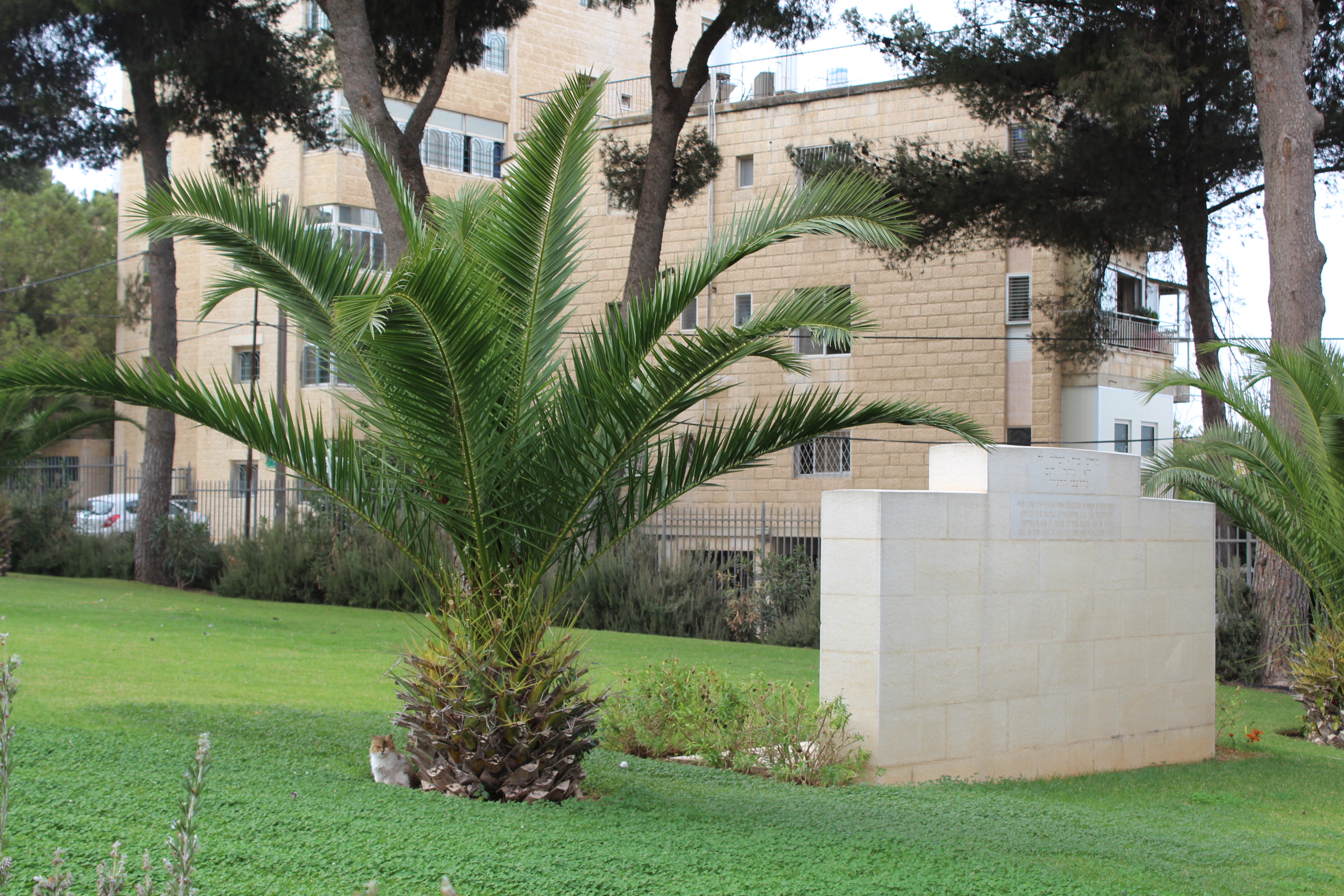
- Jerusalem Indian War Cemetery
- Used for those deceased July 1918-July 1920
- Location: 31.749308°N 35.222136°E near Jerusalem, Israel
- Designed by: John James Burnet

Burials by war
- World War I

The Jerusalem Indian War Cemetery is a Commonwealth War Graves Commission cemetery in Jerusalem for fallen servicemen of the British Indian Army that served during the First World War.

== History ==
The cemetery is located in the southern neighbourhood of Talpiot, on Korei HaDorot Street. It contains the mass grave of 79 British Raj soldiers from the Egyptian Expeditionary Force, as well as the graves of 290 Ottoman prisoners of war. The majority of those that are buried were killed during the 1917 Battle of Jerusalem. At the time of the cemetery's creation, the names of the individual British Indian Army soldiers buried were not recorded on the central monument but were noted down on the cemetery's register. In 2001, the monument was amended to inscribe all names of those known to be buried at the cemetery on it. Only 50 names of the 290 Ottoman prisoners are known and have been recorded on the cemetery monument.

Other war dead, many of them Arab workers employed by the expeditionary corps, are buried in three more separate cemeteries: the Latin (Catholic) Cemetery and the Protestant Cemetery (likely those from Mount Zion), and the Bab Sitna Mariam Muslim cemetery next to the Lions' Gate.

The Jerusalem Indian War Cemetery is often visited by Indian government ministers whenever they visit Israel. In 2021, the Indian External Affairs Minister, Subrahmanyam Jaishankar attended the Cemetery to lay a wreath in tribute. Formal Remembrance services are held at the Cemetery every Armistice Day.
