= Dung Gate =

Gate of the Old City of Jerusalem

- שער האשפות (Hebrew) باب المغاربة (Arabic)
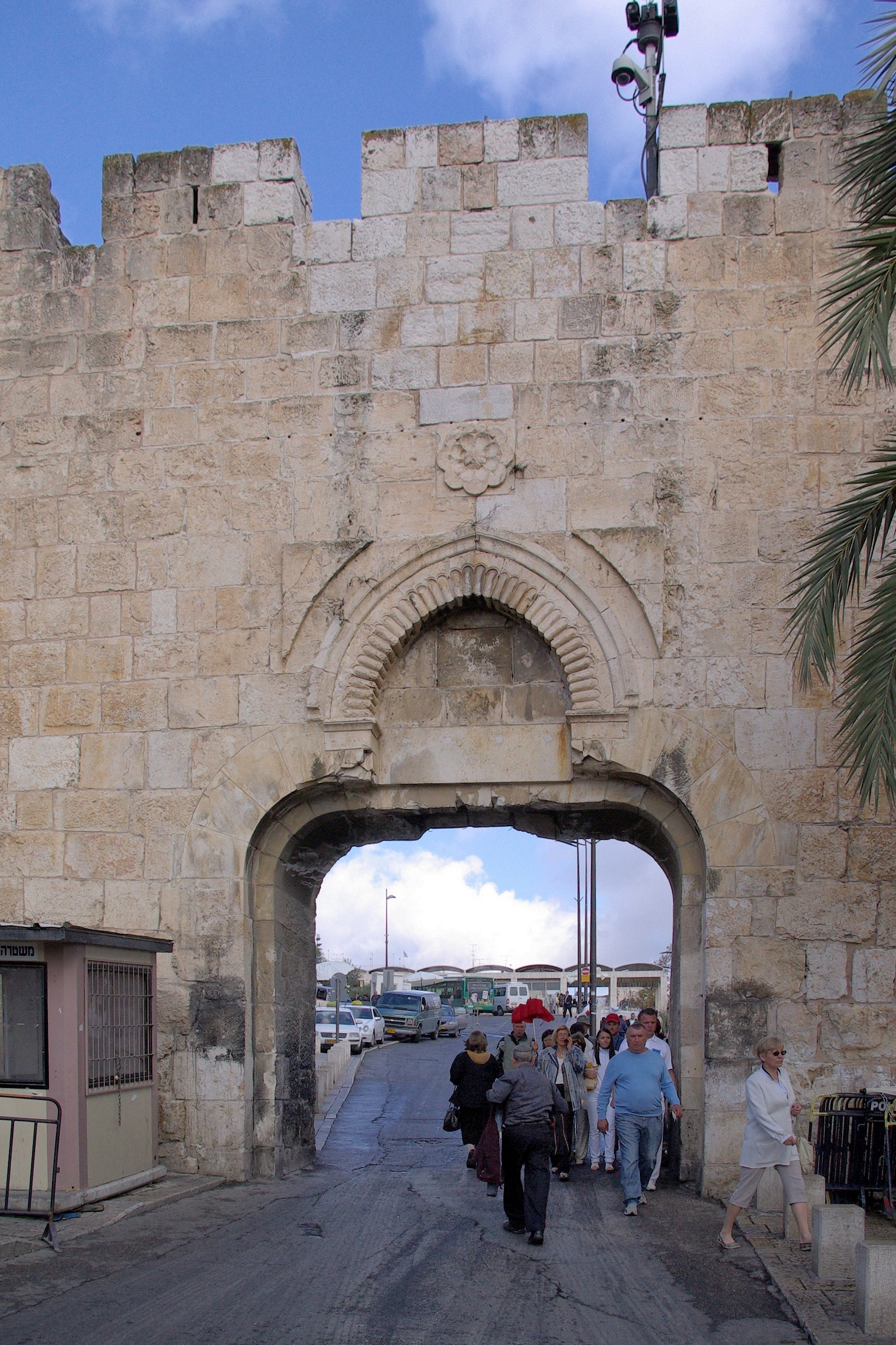
- Dung Gate

- Location within Old City of Jerusalem
- Alternative names: Silwan Gate, Mughrabi Gate,

General information
- Type: City gate
- Location: Jerusalem
- Coordinates: 31°46′29″N 35°14′2″E
- Construction started: 1537
- Completed: 1541
- Renovated: 1952 (by Jordan), 1985 (by Israel)

The Dung Gate (Hebrew: שער האשפות, romanized: Sha'ar Ha'ashpot), also known as Bab al-Maghariba (Arabic: باب المغاربة, romanized: Gate of the Maghrebis), Mughrabi Gate, Moroccan Gate or Silwan Gate, is one of the Gates of the Old City of Jerusalem. It was built as a small postern gate in the 16th century by the Ottomans, first widened for vehicular traffic in 1952 by the Jordanian and again in 1985 by the Israeli authorities. The Dung Gate is the main passage for vehicles coming out of the Old City and for buses headed to the Western Wall.

== Names ==
The Dung Gate was originally known as the Maghrebi Gate. This name alludes to the Mughrabi Quarter, a neighborhood of North Africans, which was historically situated just inside the gate. The same name also refers to a different gate which overlooks the old Mughrabi Quarter site and allows entrance into the Temple Mount above.

The Maghrebi Muslims were renowned for their valour in fighting alongside Salah al-Din, who resettled them on the western side of Al-Aqsa Mosque in order to re-Islamize the city. His son, al-Afdal Ali, later founded the Mughrabi quarter (Harat al-Maghariba) along with the Preferred School. The entire neighborhood was razed by Israel in the aftermath of the Six-Day War in order to make way for the Western Wall Plaza.

In the 19th century, Zionists began to refer to the gate as Dung Gate (Hebrew: שער האשפות Sha'ar Ha'ashpot). This was done in commemoration of an ancient gate in the Jerusalem wall from the Hebrew Bible (Nehemiah 3:13–14) which was located near the Pool of Siloam in the days of the Second Temple. It was probably named after the residue that was taken from the Jewish Temple into the Valley of Hinnom, where it was burned. The name was transferred to this small gate - at first, a small rectangular postern in the tower of the wall - in the 19th century.

The name Silwan Gate refers to the village of Silwan, that lies outside the gate, broadly southeast of it.

== History ==
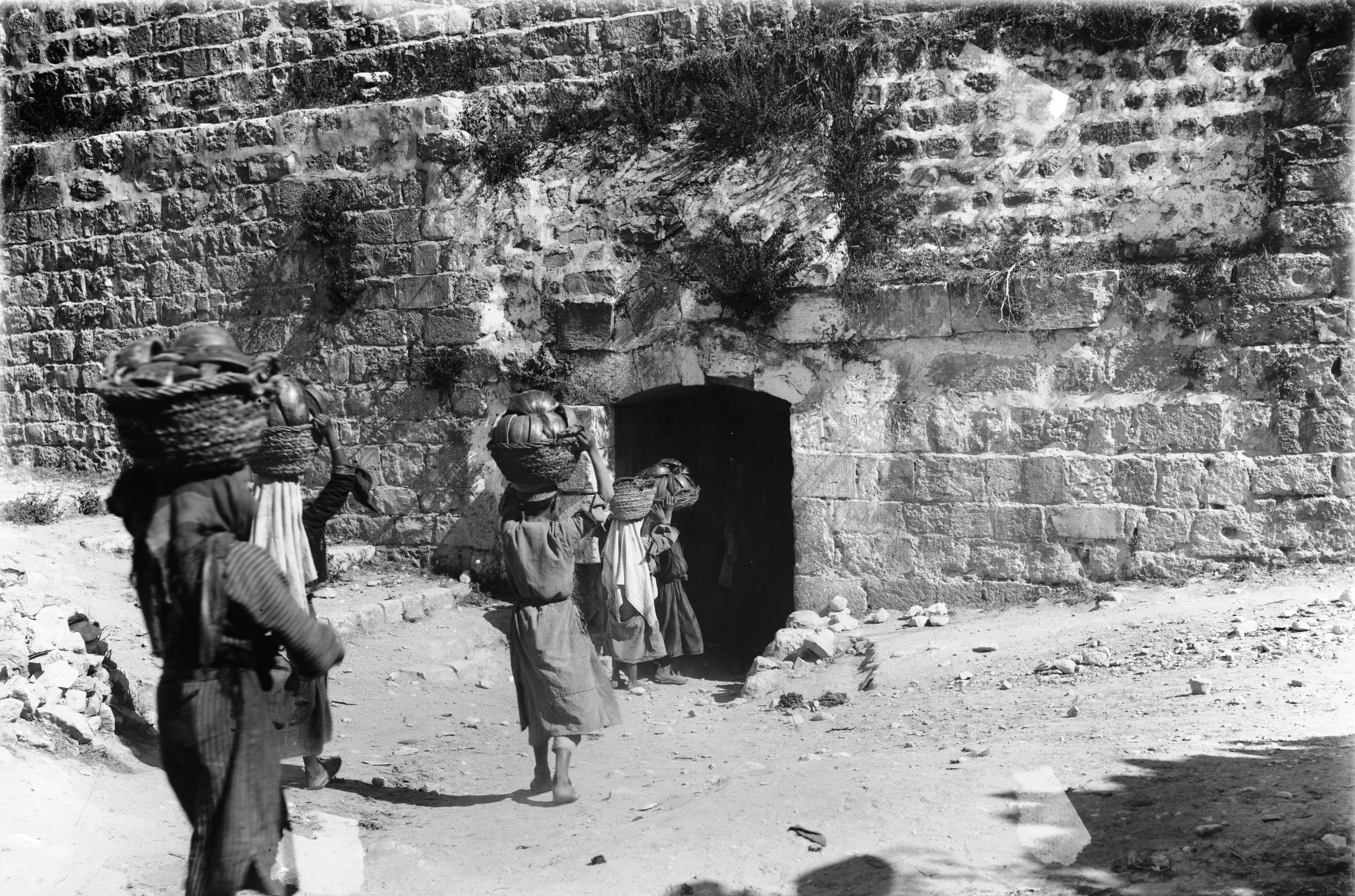
Ottoman Dung Gate during the Mandate period

The gate was built as part of the new city walls erected under Suleiman the Magnificent between 1537 and 1541. The original opening was just 1.5 metres wide, topped by an arch and only designed for pedestrians and pack animals to pass through. Initially the gate, or more precisely the postern, included an inner gate tower, which was demolished before the end of the Ottoman period. Towards the end of Ottoman rule, a new gate tower or gatehouse was added, but this time outside the wall, in a style that blended in with the 16th-century fortifications. This outer tower was demolished by the British Mandate officials in 1938, probably as part of their drive to restore the walls to their original look, this bringing back to light the old stone decorations.

=== Jordanian and Israeli modernisation ===
In 1952, when the gate was widened by the Jordanian authorities to allow cars and buses to pass through it, a reinforced concrete girder was installed under the old stone arch. In 1984–85 the gate was again enlarged, the old arch and the other decorative elements being raised, so that the opening reached a height of 4.5 metres. The modern gate is built of reinforced concrete, but clad in stone, and the new design helps the old and new elements blend together without disturbing the general style of the city wall, with the gate's opening closing in a more curvy line instead of the straight Jordanian lintel. Landscape architect Shlomo Aronson cooperated with architect Arthur Kutcher at implementing the decision of the Jerusalem Foundation established by then-mayor Teddy Kollek, motivated by the sharp increase in pilgrims' traffic.

== See also ==
- Gates of the Old City of Jerusalem
- Walls of Jerusalem
