= Zion Gate =

Gate of the Old City of Jerusalem

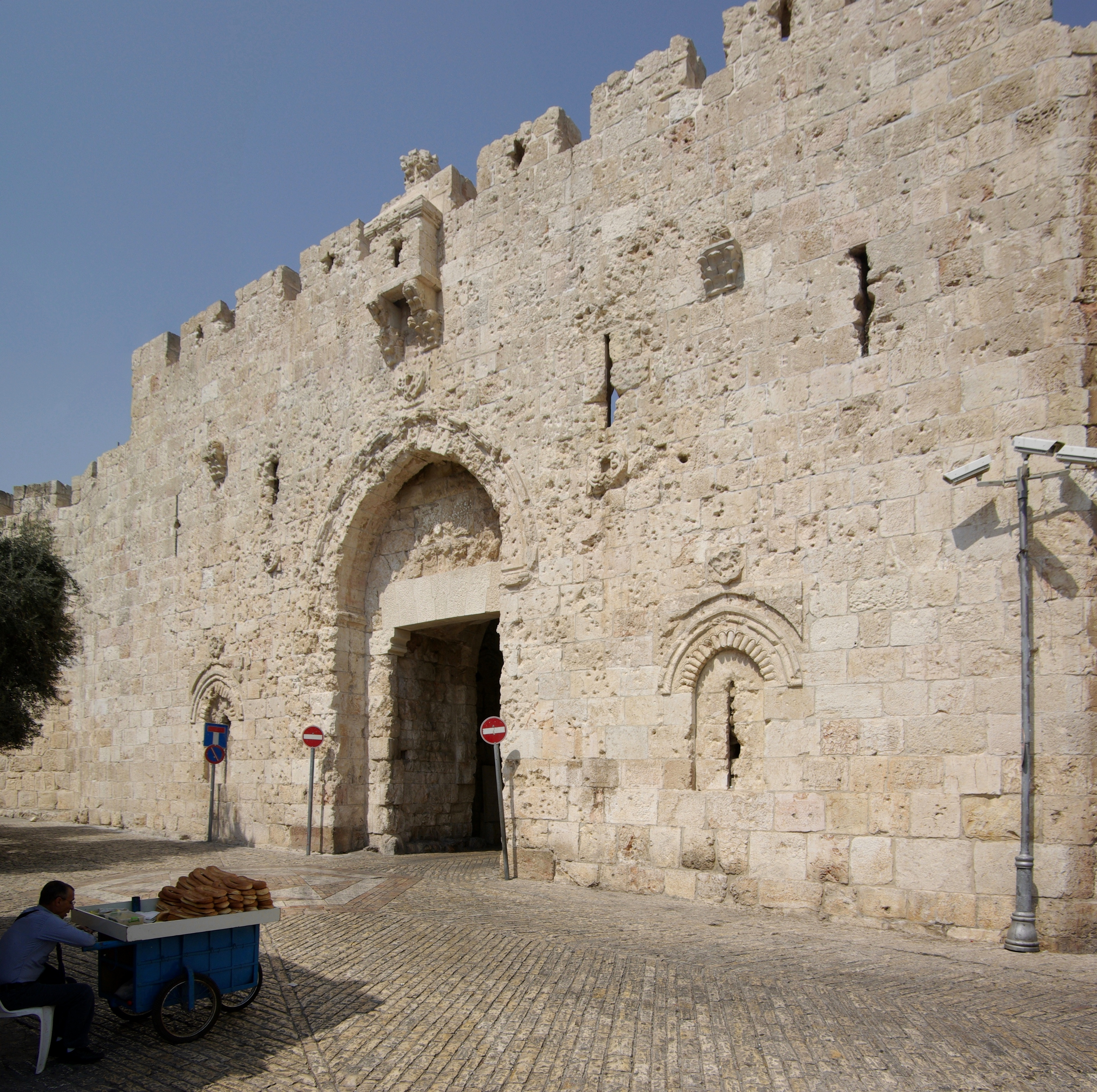
- Zion Gate

- Location within Old City of Jerusalem

General information
- Location: Jerusalem
- Coordinates: 31°46′22.3″N 35°13′45.7″E

Zion Gate (Hebrew: שער ציון, Sha'ar Zion, باب النبي داود, Bab an-Nabi Dawud ("Prophet David Gate")), also known in Arabic as Bab Sahyun or Bab Harat al-Yahud, is one of the seven historic Gates of the Old City of Jerusalem.

== History ==
Zion Gate was built in July 1540, west of the location of the medieval gate, which was a direct continuation of the Street of the Jews (also known as the Cardo). Six sentry towers were erected in the southern segment of the wall, four of them situated in the Mount Zion section.

In the second half of the nineteenth century, a leper colony, slaughterhouse and livestock market were situated in the vicinity of Zion Gate. Towards the end of the nineteenth century, shops were built along the length of the southern wall which were torn down during the British Mandate.

On 13 May 1948, as the British Army withdrew from Jerusalem, a major from the Suffolk Regiment presented Mordechai Weingarten with the key for the Zion Gate.

In 2008, restoration work was carried out on the gate, marking its 468th birthday.

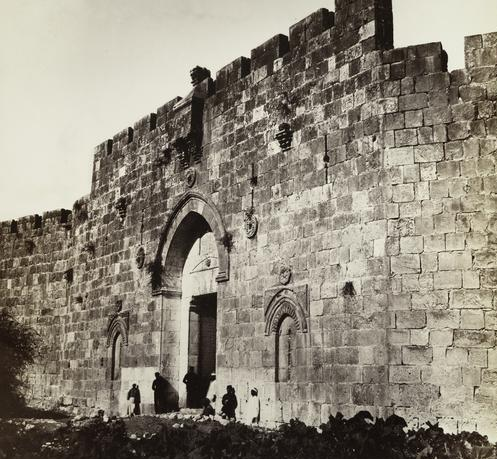
Zion Gate, 1865

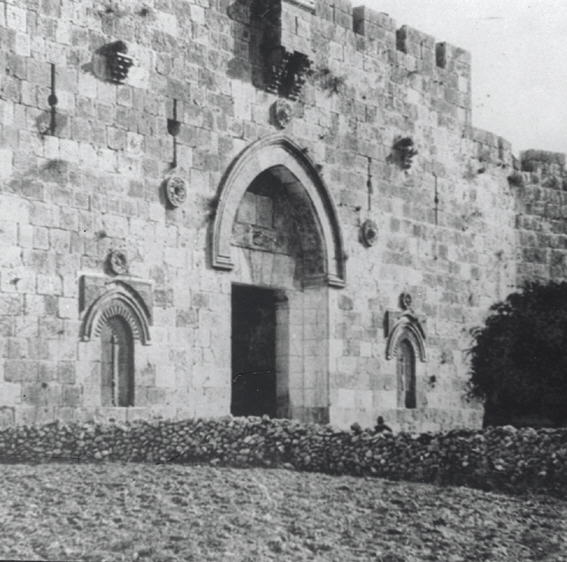
Zion Gate 1930

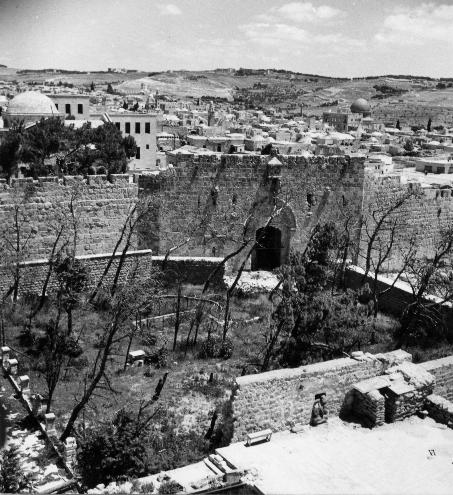
Zion Gate 1948

== See also ==
- Gates of the Old City of Jerusalem
- Walls of Jerusalem
- Battle for Jerusalem
- Suleiman the Magnificent
