= Mughrabi Quarter =

Former neighborhood in Jerusalem

Coordinates: 31°46′36″N 35°14′3″E

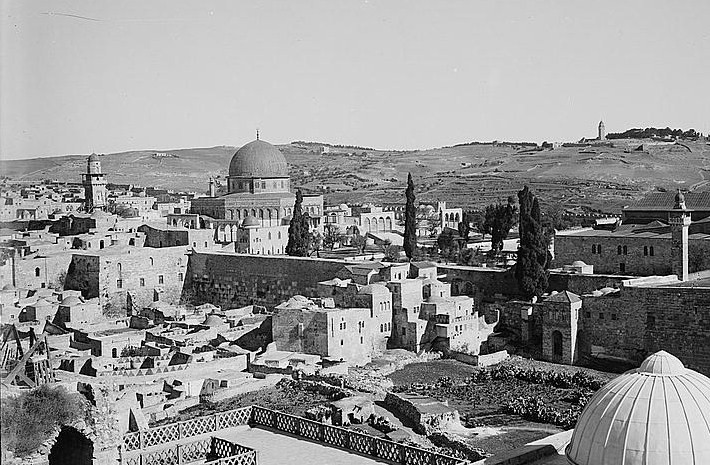
Historic photo of the Mughrabi Quarter with the Dome of the Rock in the background.

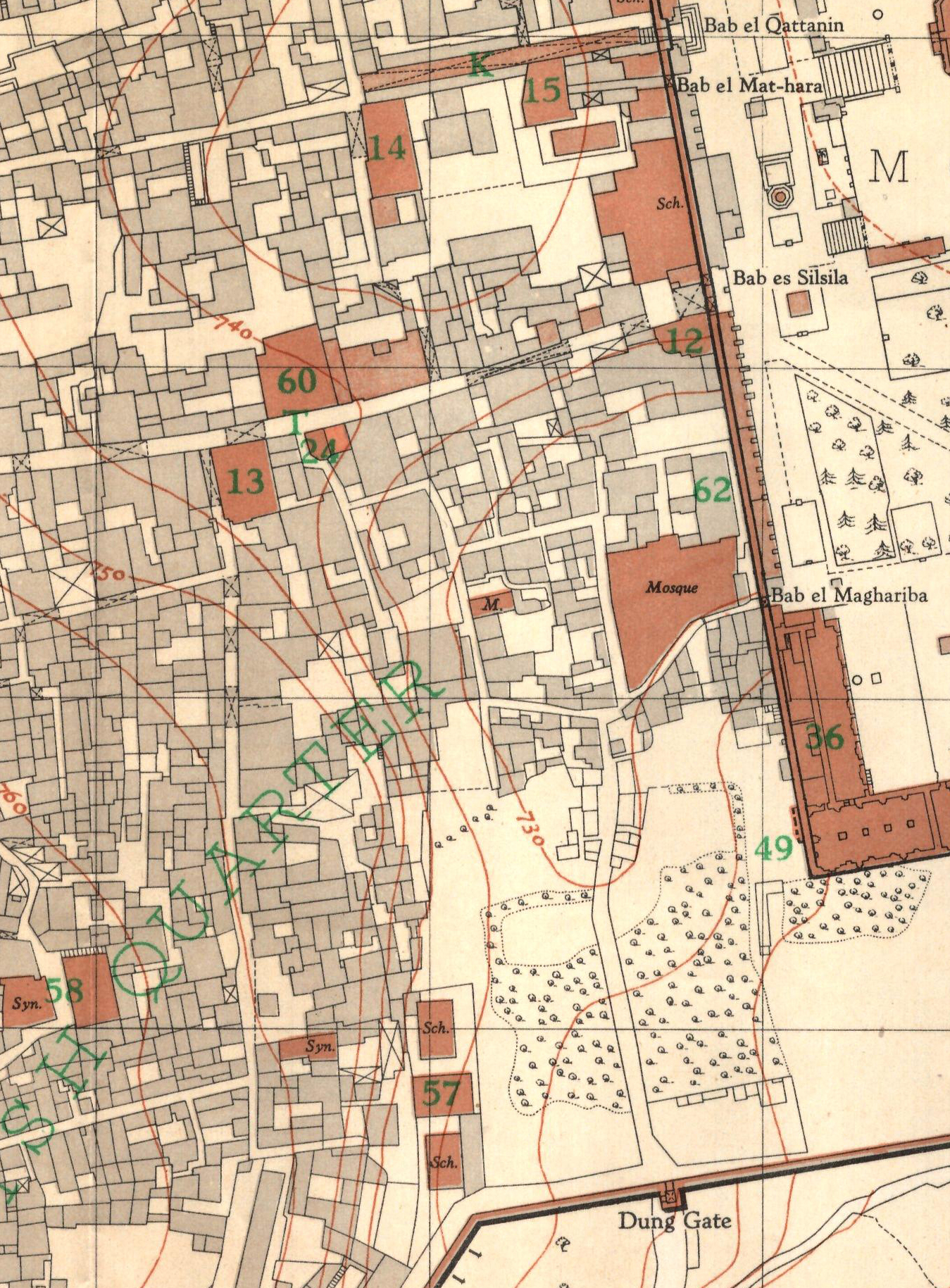
The Mughrabi Quarter – primarily in cell J9 – in the 1947 Survey of Palestine map. The two demolished mosques are shown in red.

The Mughrabi Quarter, (Note: Arabic: حارَة المَغارِبة, romanized: Hārat al-Maghāriba, lit. 'Neighbourhood of the Maghrebis'; Hebrew: שכונת המוגרבים, Sh'khunat HaMughrabim) also known as the Moroccan Quarter or Maghrebi Quarter, was a historic neighbourhood in the southeast corner of the Old City of Jerusalem. Established in the late 12th century, it bordered the Western Wall of the Haram al-Sharif / Temple Mount to the east, the Old City walls to the south (including the Dung Gate), and the Jewish Quarter to the west. The quarter was originally founded in 1193 as an Islamic charitable trust (waqf) by al-Malik al-Afdal, a son of Saladin, dedicated to providing housing and religious services for North African Muslim pilgrims and scholars.

The quarter was razed by Israeli forces, at the behest of Teddy Kollek, the mayor of West Jerusalem, three days after the Six-Day War of 1967, in order to broaden the narrow alley leading to the Western Wall and prepare it for public access by Jews seeking to pray there. It is now the site of the Western Wall Plaza.

== History ==
=== Ayyubid and Mamluk eras ===
According to the 15th-century historian Mujir ad-Dīn, soon after the Arabs had wrested back Jerusalem from the Crusaders the quarter was established in 1193 by Saladin's son al-Malik al-Afḍal Nurud-Dīn 'Ali, as a waqf (a mortmain consisting of a charitable trust) (Note: "every document of foundation dedicating property as waqf lays down provisions that it is unalienable, that the benefits from its yield are permanent, and that the document of foundation is irrevocable." (Tibawi 1978, p. 11)) dedicated to all North African immigrants. The boundaries of this ḥārat or quarter, according to a later document, were the outer wall of the Haram al-Sharif to the east; south to the public thoroughfare leading to the Siloan spring; west as far as the residence of the qadi of Jerusalem, Shams al-Din; the northern limit ran to the Arcades of Umm al-Banat, otherwise known as the Qanṭarat Umam al-Banāt/Wilson's Arch causeway. It was set aside for "the benefit of all the community of the Maghreb of all description and different occupations, male and female, old and young, the low and the high, to settle on it in its residences and to benefit from its uses according to their different needs." Soon after, Jews, many also from North Africa, were also allowed to settle in the city. By 1303, Maghrebi people were well established there, a fact attested by the endowment of a Zāwiyah, or religious institution such as a monastery, made by 'Umar Ibn Abdullah Ibn 'Abdun-Nabi al-Maṣmūdi al-Mujarrad for this quarter.

Al-Afḍal's waqf was not only religious and charitable in its aims, but also provided for the establishment of a madrassa law school there, thereafter called eponymously the Afḍaliyyah, for the benefit of the Malikite Islamic jurists (fuqaha) in the city. On 2 November 1320, a distinguished scion of an Andalusian Sufi family of mystics, Abū Madyan, who had settled in Jerusalem in the early 14th century, drew up a larger waqf endowment consisting of a Zāwiyah near the Bāb al-Silsilah, or Chain Gate, of the Harat, for the Maghrebis. This second document became the foundational act which was to form the legal cornerstone and richest funding source from that time on until 1967 for the Maghrebi Quarter. It consisted in a waqf property at 'Ain Kārim and another at Qanṭarat Umam al-Banāt at the Gate of the Chain—the latter as a hospice exclusively for newly arrived immigrants—the usufruct (manfa'ah) of both to be set aside in perpetuity for the Maghrebis in Jerusalem. The Qanṭarat Umam al-Banāt endowment consisted of a hall, two apartments, a yard, private conveniences, and, below, a store and a cave (qabw). Attached to the document was a stipulation that the properties be placed, after the donor's death, under the care of an administrator (mutawalli) and supervisor (nāzir) selected on the basis of the community's recognition of his outstanding qualities of piety and wisdom. The Ain Karim properties alone were extensive, 15,000 dunams, and covered most of the village.

Some time in the early 1350s, (Note: The source, Tibawi, specifies the year as 1352, which is one year after the date usually given for the death of the Marinid king of that time (Tibawi 1978, p. 13).) a third waqf was instituted by the Marinid Dynasty's King 'Ali Ibn 'Uthmān Ibn Ya'qūb Ibn 'Abdul-Ḥaqq al-Marini. This consisted of a codex of the Qur'an copied by his own hand Further endowments to the quarter took place in 1595 and 1630.

Until the advent of Muslims in Jerusalem, most of the area below the Western Wall was crammed with rubble, and Jewish prayer throughout the Islamic period appears to have been performed inside synagogues in the Jewish Quarter, or, on public occasions, on the Mount of Olives. The narrow space dividing the Western Wall from the houses of the Mughrabi Quarter was created at the behest of Suleiman the Magnificent in the sixteenth century in order to allow prayers to be said there.

=== Ottoman era ===
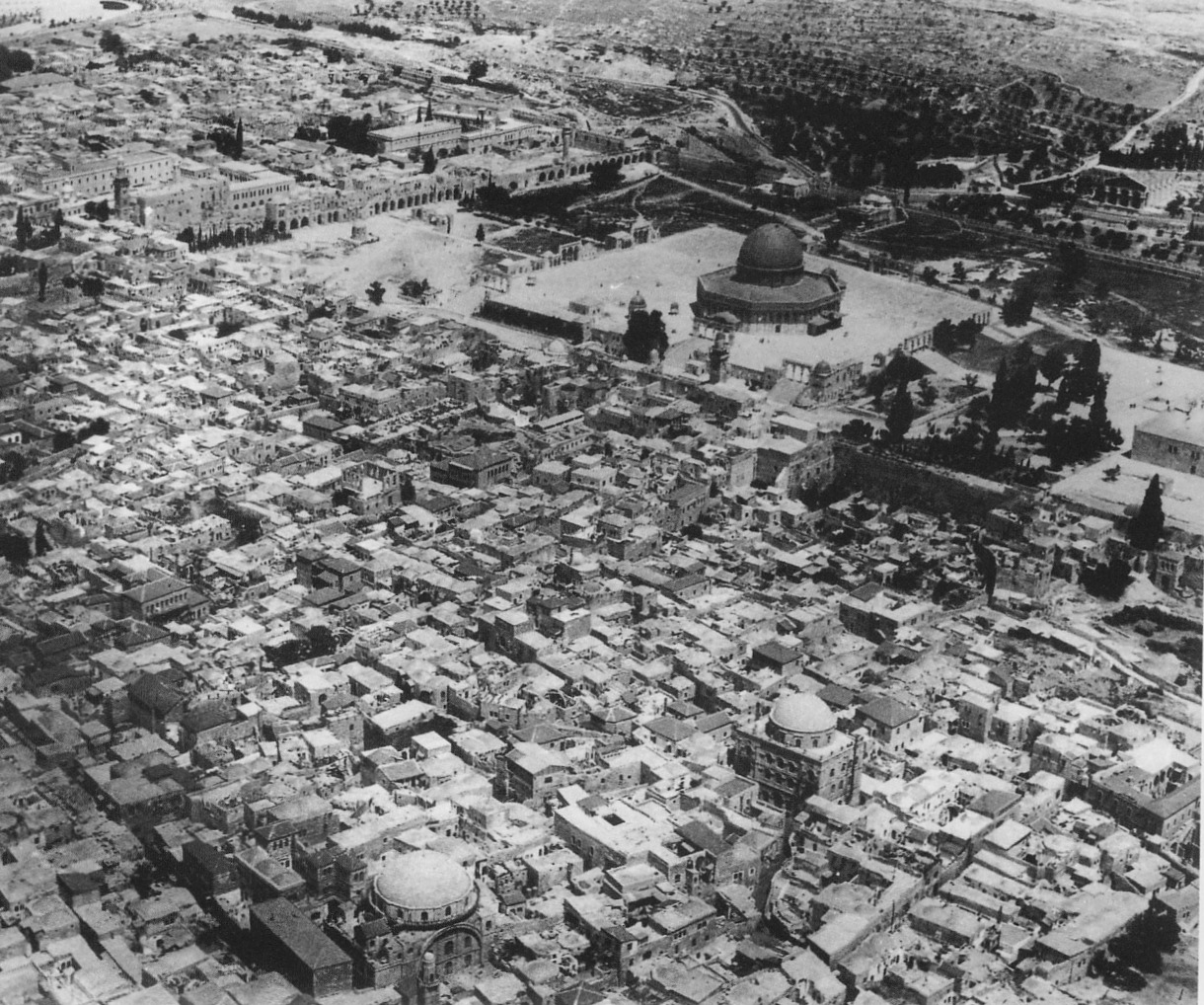
An aerial view of the Jewish and Mughrabi quarters, circa 1937 photograph.

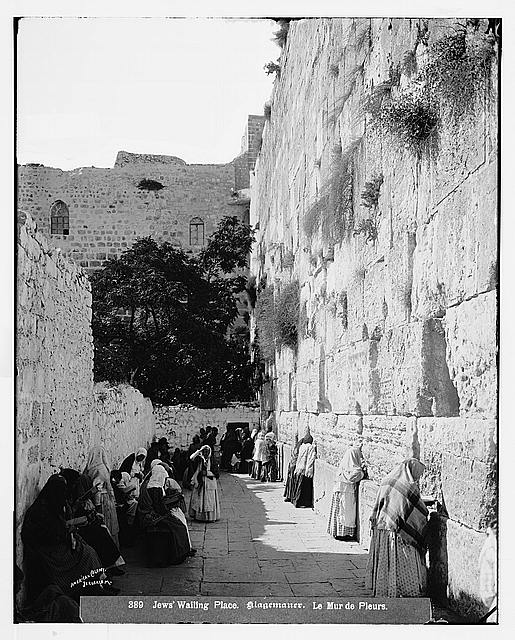
Mughrabi neighborhood dwellings (left) bordering the Western Wall (right), circa 1898–1914. View towards north.

The Ottoman taxation registers listed 13 households in the quarter in 1525–26, 69 households, 1 bachelor and 1 imam in 1538–39, 84 households and 11 bachelors in 1553–34, 130 households and 2 bachelors in 1562–63, and 126 households and 7 bachelors in 1596–97. Originally developed for Maghrebi people, over the centuries Jewish, Christian and Muslim people from Palestine and elsewhere had at various times taken up residence there. By the time Israel decided to demolish their houses, roughly half of the zone's inhabitants could trace their origins back to Maghreb immigrants.

According to the French traveller Chateaubriand who visited in 1806, some of the residents of the quarter were descended from Moors who had been expelled from Spain in the late 15th century. They had been well received by the local community and a mosque had been built for them. Residents of the neighborhood held on to their culture in the way of food, clothing and traditions until it became assimilated with the rest of the Old City in the 19th century. Thus it also became a natural place of stay to Maghrebi people who came on pilgrimage to the al-Aqsa Mosque.

Over the years a small number of schools and mosques were established in the quarter and Muslim clerics who performed religious duties at the al-Aqsa Mosque lived there.

The site of Jewish prayer and lamentation was a stretch of some 30 metres (100 ft) along the wall, accessed via a narrow passage from King David's Street. In depth from the wall the paved area extended 11 feet. At the southern end lay one of the two zāwiyyah dedicated there in medieval times and the lane to the Wailing Wall sector ended in a blind alley closed off by the houses of the Maghrebi people beneficiaries. In 1840 a proposal by a British Jew, the first attempt to change the status quo, was conveyed via the British consul, and requested that Jews be allowed to repave the 120 sq. metre (1300 sq. ft.) area. The plan was rejected both by the Abu Madyan waqf administrator and by Muhammad Ali Pasha. Muslims in the area also complained of the excessive noise, as opposed to past practice, caused by recent Jewish pilgrims. Jews at prayer were asked to continue their traditional practices quietly, and to refrain from proclaiming on doctrinal matters there.

By the beginning of the 19th century Jewish worshippers were few, and according to Yehoshua Ben Arieh, lacked any special distinction. In an account of his travels to the Holy Land in 1845, T. Tobler noted the existence of a mosque in the Mughrabi quarter.

According to Yeohoshua Ben-Arieh, the Maghrebi people regarded the Jews as infidels. They were subjected to harassment and were required to pay a sum in exchange for the right to pray there undisturbed. (Note: "Special relations – on the whole, tense ones – developed between the Jews and the Mughrabis because of the proximity of the latter's homes to the Wailing Wall. The Mughrabis, like the rest of the Muslims, regarded the Jews as Infidels and harassed them. The Jews had to pay the Mughrabis in order to keep them from disturbing prayer services." (Ben-Arieh 1984, p. 157)) (Note: "In the afternoon of the same day, I went with Mr. Lanneau to the place where the Jews are permitted to purchase the right of approaching the site of their temple, and of praying and wailing over its ruins and the downfall of their nation. ... It is the nearest point in which they can venture to approach their ancient temple; and fortunately for them, it is sheltered from observation by the narrowness of the lane and the dead walls around." (Robinson 1841, pp. 349–350)) Increased friction at the site between Jews and Muslims arose with the onset of Zionism and the resulting fear among the Muslims that the Jews would claim the entire Temple Mount. (Note: "Muslim hostility regarding Jewish prayer at the Western Wall really only became manifest with the advent of Zionism.. prior to then, it had never really been an issue. Now, however, there was a growing belief that Zionist claims regarding Jewish rights of prayer at the Wall were only a first step towards laying claim to the Temple Mount in its entirety." (Freas 2018, p. 77)) Attempts were made at various times, by Moses Montefiore and Baron Rothschild to buy the whole area, without success. In 1887 Rothschild's bid to purchase the Quarter came with a project to rebuild it as "a merit and honor to the Jewish People" (Note: (Rothschild) was appalled at the situation. He decided to buy the whole Moghrabi section and demolish the houses in order to clear a gigantic plaza where Jews could easily and comfortably gather at the holy place. The Moghrabi section was occupied by low-class Arabs from North Africa whose houses were of the cheapest quality in the Old City. The results of this discussion with the Moslem authorities were positive. They conditioned the sale on building better housing for Moghrabi's residents at another location. He immediately agreed. Though the price was high, he wished to do so as a "merit and honor to the Jewish People" (Rossoff 2001, pp. 330–331)) relocating the inhabitants in better accommodation elsewhere. The Ottoman authorities appeared to be ready to give their approval. According to some sources, the highest secular and Muslim religious authorities in Jerusalem, such as the Mutasarrıf or Ottoman Governor of Jerusalem, Şerif Mehmed Rauf Paşa, and the Mufti of Jerusalem, Mohammed Tahir Husseini, actually gave their approval. The plan foundered on Jewish, rather than Muslim, objections and was shelved after the chief rabbinical Haham of the Jerusalemite Sephardi community stated that he had had a "providential intimation" that, were the sale to go through, a terrible massacre of Jews would ensue. His opinion might have reflected a Sephardi fear that the Ashkenazis would thereby take possession of the holiest site in Judaism.

In the first two months after the Ottoman Empire's entry into the First World War, the Turkish governor of Jerusalem, Zakey Bey, offered to sell the quarter to Jews, requesting a sum of £20,000 which, he said, would be used to both rehouse the Muslim families and to create a public garden in front of the Wall. However, the Jews of the city lacked the necessary funds.

=== British Mandate era ===
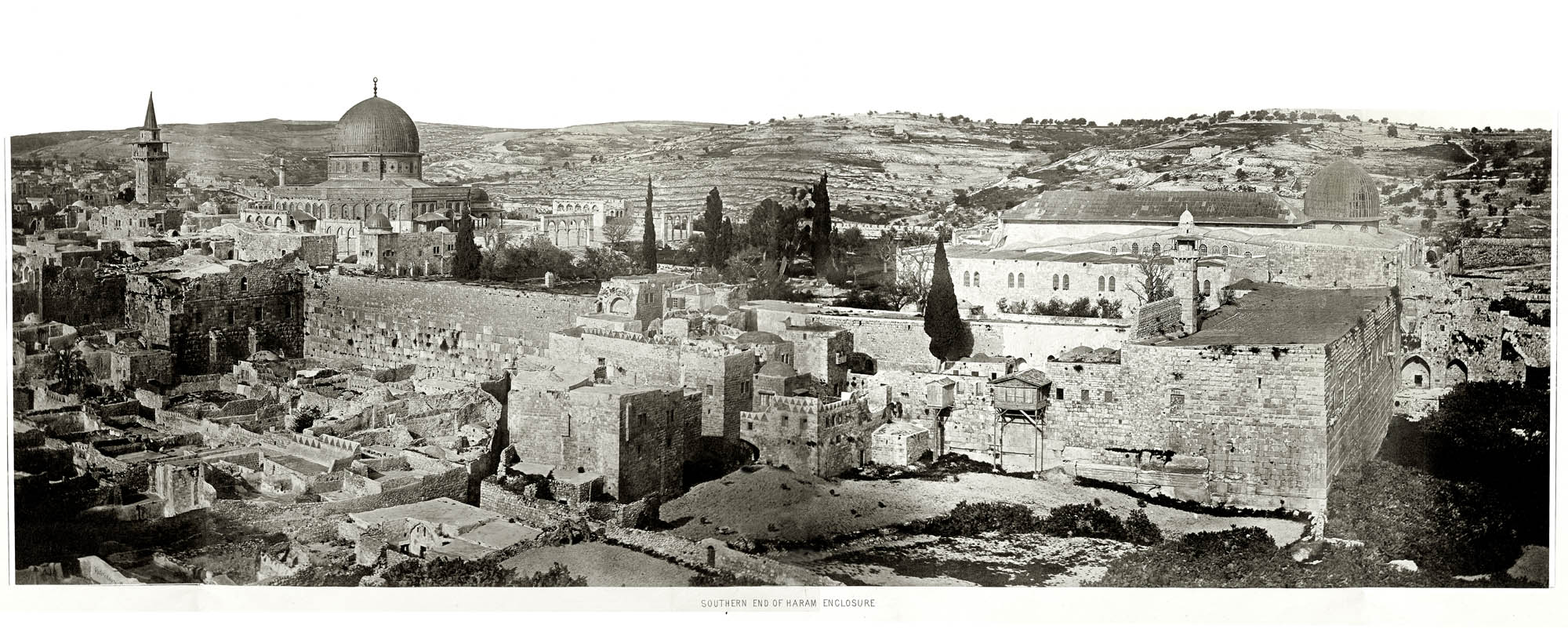
19th century photo of the Mughrabi Quarter

A hospice, the Dar al-Magharibah, existed in the quarter to extend lodgings for Mughrabi Muslims on pilgrimage to the Islamic sites of Jerusalem.

In April 1918, Chaim Weizmann, then a prominent Zionist leader on a visit to Jerusalem, sent a letter via Ronald Storrs offering the sheikhs £70,000 in exchange for the Wall and the buildings of the Mughrabi quarter. This was immediately rejected when the Muslim authorities got wind of the proposal. Nothing daunted, Weizmann then addressed his petition to Arthur Balfour, asking him to resolve the issue by ruling in favour of the Jews. In a letter of 30 May that year, headed THE HANDING OVER OF THE WAILING WALL TO THE JEWS, he gave his reasons as follows:

We Jews have many holy places in Palestine, but the Wailing Wall-believed to be part of the old Temple Wall-is the only one which is in some sense left to us. All the others are in the hands of Christians or Moslems. And even the Wailing Wall is not really ours. It is surrounded by a group of miserable, dirty cottages and derelict buildings, which make the whole place from the hygienic point of view a positive danger, and from the sentimental point of view a source of constant humiliation to the Jews of the world. Our most sacred monument, in our most sacred city, is in the hands of some doubtful Moghreb religious community, which keeps these cottages as a source of income. We are willing to compensate this community very liberally, but we should like the place to be cleaned up; we should like to give it a dignified and respectable appearance.

The wall as well as the Mughrabi Quarter nonetheless, throughout the British Mandatory period, remained Waqf property, while Jews retained their longstanding right to visit it. During the 1929 Palestine riots, violent clashes erupted over competing claims to the area adjacent to the Western Wall. While Jewish leaders maintained that they harboured no designs on the Haram al-Sharif, denying any intention to claim the Haram al-Sharif, Zionist representatives petitioned the British Mandatory government to expropriate and raze the Mughrabi Quarter to expand the narrow prayer lane. Jewish Maghrebi people and Muslim Maghrebi people pilgrims, both groups on a visit to Jerusalem, were present at the riots, and several of the former were killed or injured. (Note: "The relationship between the Jewish intelligentsia and nationalist circles had already been colored by the 1929 Wailing Wall incident in Jerusalem in which Jewish Maghrebi people pilgrims who were praying at the Wall were killed and injured. The matter became a popular topic in the Maghrebi people Jewish press, but also in the Maghrebi people Muslim press because Muslim Maghrebi people pilgrims were concurrently housed in the nearby Dar al-Magharibah, a hospice that had belonged to the Palestinian Muslim waqf." (Ben-Layashi & Maddy-Weitzman 2015, p. 10)) Great Britain appointed a commission under the approval of the League of Nations to settle the issue. The Commission again reaffirmed the status quo, while placing certain restrictions on activities, including forbidding Jews from conducting the Yom Kippur prayers (the holiest holiday in Judaism), which involved the blowing of the Shofar, and Muslims from carrying out the Dhikr (Islamic prayers) close to the wall or to cause annoyance to the Jews.

=== Jordanian era ===
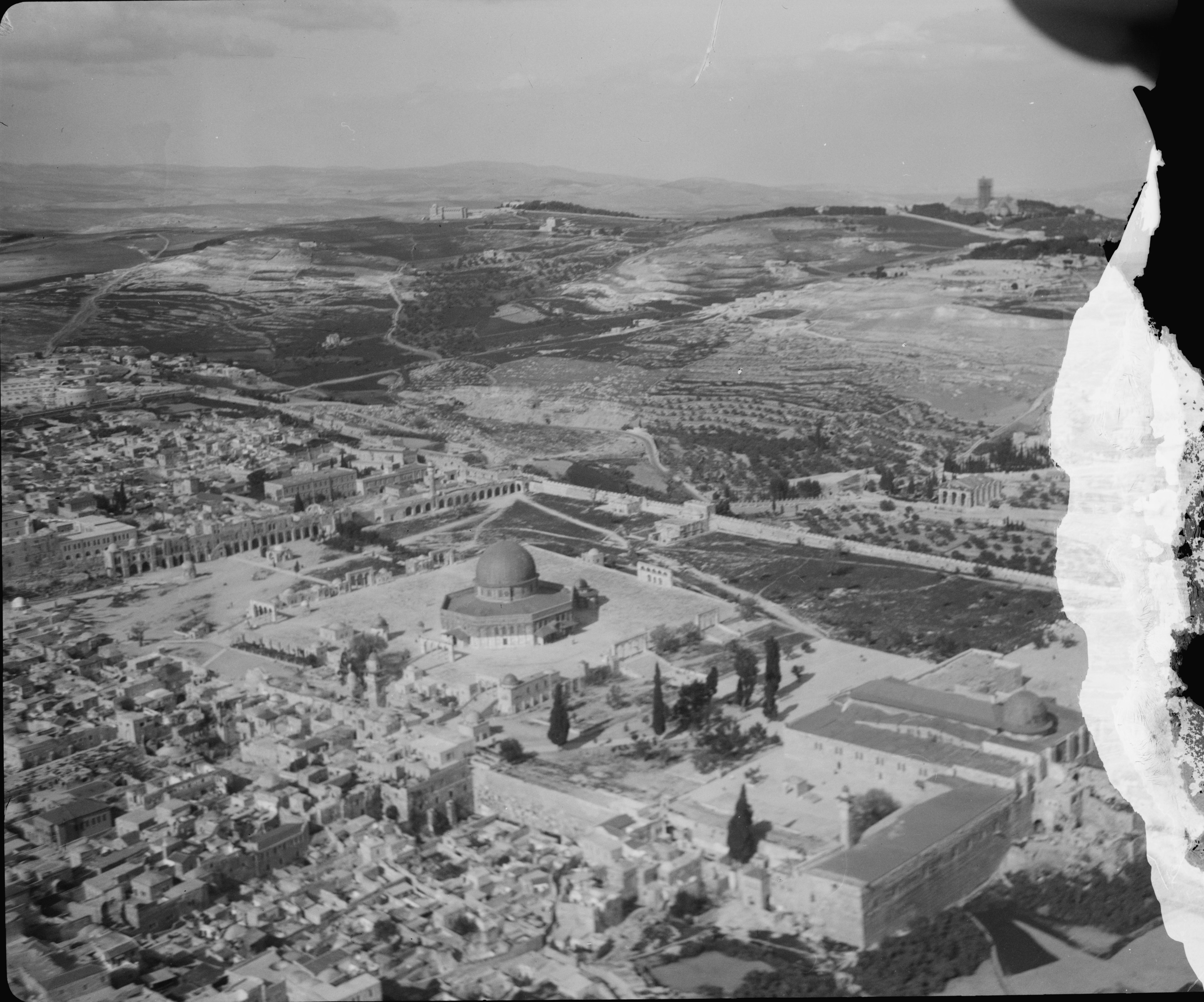
An aerial view of the Al-Aqsa Mosque Compound from the west, taken between 1910 and 1946 with the quarter still visible

When Jordanian forces emerged as the victors in the battle for possession of the Old City in the 1948 Arab–Israeli War, 1,500 Jewish residents, coinciding with the flight or expulsion of 70,000 Palestinians from Israeli-occupied areas of Jerusalem, (Note: 30,000 is given for the number of Palestinians expelled from the western part of Jerusalem by Rashid Khalidi (El-Haj 2008, p. 166).) were expelled from the Jewish Quarter, which was in the vicinity of the Mughrabi zone. (Note: "Intense fighting took place in the vicinity of this quarter between Zionist forces sent to wrest this area from the Jordanian forces. The former were eventually defeated in the summer of 1948. They and the 1,500 Jewish civilians living in this part of the Old City were expelled (the non-combatants were sent across the frontier that divided the city between Israeli and Jordanian held sectors, while the Jewish soldiers were held and then released as few months later). The flight of these 1,500 Jews coincided with the forced removal of 700,000 Arabs from areas of historic Palestine conquered by Israel in 1948, including 70,000 from Jerusalem." (Abowd 2000, p. 8))

Disputes were not infrequent between the quarter's inhabitants and Palestinian landlords, squabbling over property rights. In 1965, Palestinian squatters in Jewish properties on the edge of the Mughrabi Quarter were evicted by the Jordanian government and resettled in the Shu'afat refugee camp, four kilometers north of the Old City. The motives behind this ejection are unknown.

According to French historian Vincent Lemire, during the period of Jordanian control the French Fourth and Fifth Republics claimed extraterritorial jurisdiction over the Waqf Abu Madyan, an Algerian waqf located in the Mughrabi Quarter. France had claimed jurisdiction over the waqf on 6 July 1949. In the aftermath of the Arab–Israeli War, Israel annexed the village of Ein Karem. The Waqf Abu Madyan depended on the village's agricultural output for income and was thus left in a precarious financial situation, precipitating France's sovereignty claim.

The French Ministry of Foreign Affairs used its position in Jerusalem to curry favor with Israel, Algeria, Tunisia, and Morocco by providing financial support to the waqf and, therefore, North African Muslim pilgrims. For example, in 1954 French intellectual Louis Massignon organized a charitable collection at the gates of the Great Mosque of Tlemcen in Algeria in support of the waqf in an effort to improve Franco-Algerian relations. On 12 February 1962—four days after the Charonne Métro station massacre and about one month prior to the signing of the Évian Accords, a ceasefire agreement between France and Algeria—France abandoned its claim to the waqf.

== Demolition ==
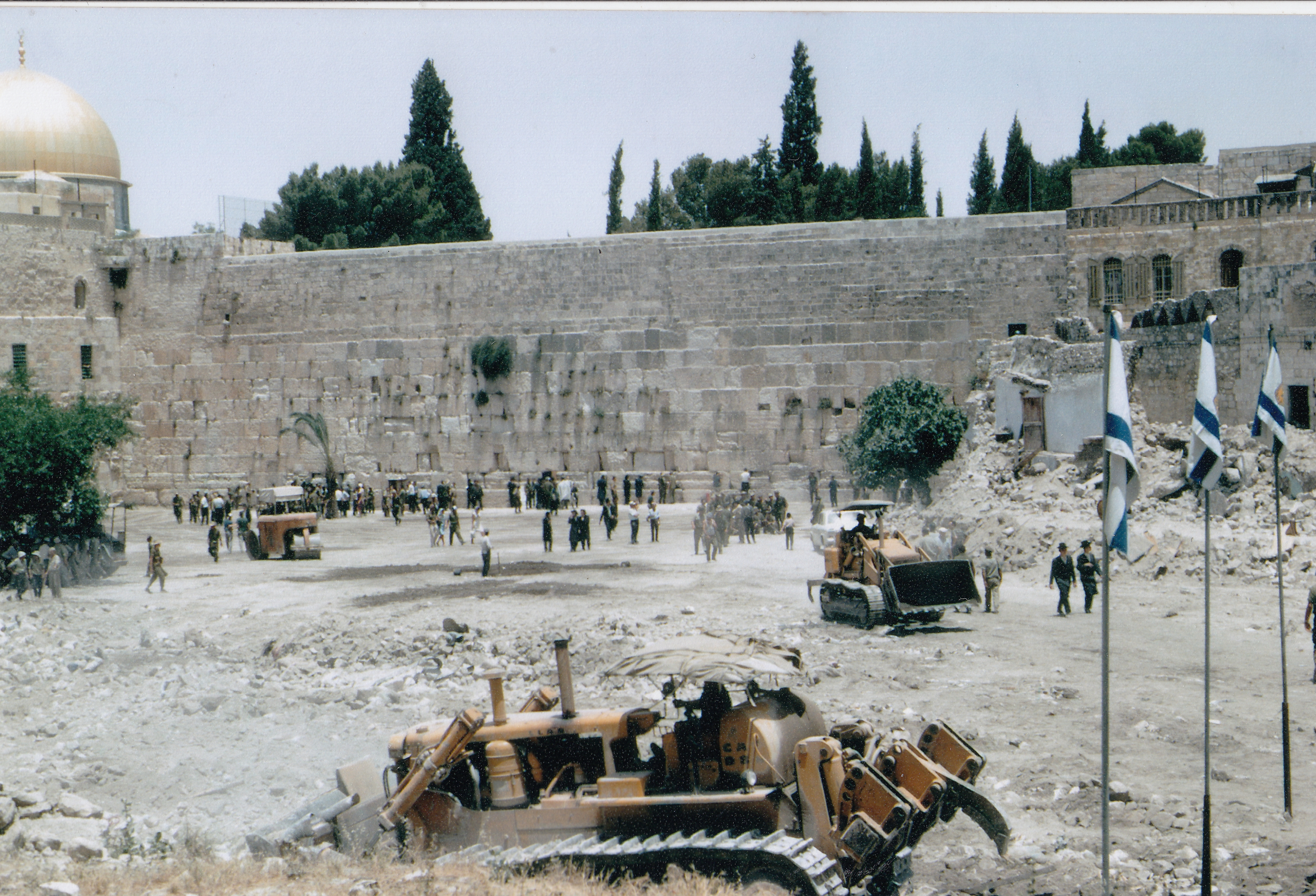
Clearing the plaza in front of the Western Wall, July 1967

=== Preparations ===
The razing of the quarter took place without any official authorization. Responsibility for demolishing the Mughrabi Quarter is contested between several figures: Teddy Kollek, Moshe Dayan, (Note: "Moshe Dayan gave immediate orders for the clearing of Arab houses adjacent to the Western Wall... Dayan announced that he would like to go further and bulldoze a road through the hills, wide enough to allow 'every Jew in the world to reach the Western Wall'." (Hulme 2006, p. 55)) Colonel Shlomo Lahat, Uzi Narkiss (Note: "The demolition was decided on by General Narkiss, the regional commander, and Major Kollek, without sanction from defense Minister Dayan and Prime Minister Eshkol." (Klein 2014, p. 185)) and David Ben-Gurion. The precise details of how the operation was carried out are not clear, since no paper trail was left by the participants. (Note: "One reason for multiple versions of what happened is that participants sought to avoid creating a paper trail. Ironically, that allowed key figures to make conflicting claims to what they regarded as credit for the operation." (Gorenberg 2007, p. 43)) According to one source, the retired Israeli Prime Minister David Ben-Gurion played a pivotal role in the decision to demolish the quarter. He visited the Wall on 8 June with Teddy Kollek, (Note: According to Uzi Benziman's Jerusalem: A City Without Walls Schocken Books, Tel Aviv (1973) (Abowd 2000, p. 15)) Shimon Peres and Ya'akov Yannai, head of the National Parks Authority at the time, (Note: Yannai states that:"the person who can take credit for expanding the area of the Wall is Ben-Gurion as opposed to those who claim it for themselves. That's because if it weren't for him, I wouldn't have done it and the others wouldn't have either." (Kabalo 2018, p. ??)) and was upset at seeing a sign in Arabic.

He noticed a tile sign in front of the Wall, which read "Al-Burak Road" in English and Arabic but not in Hebrew. It was a reminder of the prophet Mohammad's legendary horse, Buraq, left tethered by the Wall as the prophet took his journey to heaven from the famous rock above. Ben-Gurion looked at the sign with disapproval and asked if anyone had a hammer. A soldier tried to pry off the tile with a bayonet, but Ben-Gurion was concerned about damage to the stone. An axe was produced and the name on the tile carefully removed. The symbolism of expunging Arabic from the redeemed Jewish holy site was not lost on the surrounding crowd, or on Ben-Gurion. They cheered, and Ben-Gurion exclaimed, "This is the greatest moment of my life since I came to Israel."

Ben-Gurion also proposed the following day that the walls of the Old City be demolished since they weren't Jewish, but the government did not take up the idea. Teddy Kollek in his memoirs wrote that it was necessary to knock down the quarter because a pilgrimage to the wall was being organized with hundreds of thousands of Jews, and their passage through the "dangerous narrow alleys" of the "slum hovels" was unthinkable: they needed a clear bright space to celebrate their return to the site after 19 years. To that end, archaeologists and planners had examined the area the day before to map out what had to be demolished. The operations had a larger scope, not only to clear the Mughrabi quarter, but also expel all the Palestinian inhabitants of the contiguous, predominantly Arab-owned Jewish Quarter, who, he claimed, had "no special feeling" for the place and would be satisfied to receive ample compensation for their expulsion. The Jerusalem Post described the area as a jumble of hovels on the same day bulldozing operations began, and a writer later commented on this designation as follows:

The day the bulldozing began the quarter was described in The Jerusalem Post as a slum. Two days later it was reported as having been by and large abandoned during the siege. I expect in time that its existence will vanish altogether from the pages of developing Zionist history.

Shlomo Lahat, who had just flown back from a fund-raising campaign in South America, recalled that on his arrival at 4 am 7 June, Moshe Dayan informed him of the imminent conquest of Jerusalem, and that he wanted Lahat, a stickler for discipline, as military governor of the city. He needed someone "prepared to shoot Jews if need be". Once the city was taken, at a meeting involving himself, Dayan, Kollek and Uzi Narkiss, Lahat suggested that the programmed visit of Jews on Shavuot meant that there would be a crush of people crowding in, risking a higher casualty rate than that sustained by the war, and suggested the area be cleared, an idea that met Dayan's approval. This is disputed by Ya'akov Salman who stated that it was he who raised the problem of the courtyard's limitations.

=== Demolition ===
There were 135 houses in the quarter, and the destruction left at least 650 people refugees. According to one eyewitness, after its capture by Israel, the entire Old City was placed under a strict curfew. On Saturday evening 10 June, the last day of the Six-Day War, coinciding with the end of the Jewish Sabbath, a number of searchlights were positioned and floodlit up the quarter's warrens. Twenty-odd Jerusalem building contractors, hired by Kollek, first knocked down a public lavatory with sledgehammers. Army bulldozers were then brought in to raze the houses.

The residents were given either a few minutes, fifteen minutes or three hours to evacuate their homes. They initially refused to budge. In the face of this reluctance, lieutenant Colonel Ya'akov Salman, the deputy military governor, issued an order to an Engineering Corps officer to start bulldozing, and, on striking one particular structure, caused the whole building to collapse. It was this act which caused the remaining residents to flee their apartments and enter vehicles that were stationed outside to bus them away. Amidst the rubble, a middle-aged, or elderly woman, al-Hajjah Rasmiyyah 'Ali Taba'ki, was discovered in her death throes. One of the engineers, Yohanan Montsker, had her rushed to hospital but by midnight she was dead. According to an interview given two decades later by Eitan Ben-Moshe, the engineer attached to the IDF Central Command who oversaw the operation, she was not the only victim. He recalled recovering three bodies that were transported to the Bikur Cholim Hospital, and while some other bodies were buried with the disposed rubble:

I had thrown out all the garbage. We threw out the wreckage of houses together with the Arab corpses. We threw Arab corpses and not Jewish, so that they would not convert the area to a place where it is forbidden to tread. (Note: The interview was printed in the Jerusalem daily newspaper Yerushalayim, 26 November 1999 (Abowd 2000, p. 10).)

The following morning, Colonel Lahat described the demolition workers as mostly being drunk "on wine and joy".

Permission to salvage their personal belongings was denied. The reason given by an Israeli soldier was that they were pressed for time, since only two days remained before the feast of the "Passover" (actually Shavuot), and many Jews were expected to arrive on the following Tuesday at the Western Wall. The haste of demolition was necessary, it was argued, to prepare a yard for the festive worshippers. The prime minister at the time, Levi Eshkol, was completely unaware of the operation, and phoned Narkiss on the 11th asking the reason why the houses were being demolished. Narkiss, pretending not to know, replied that he'd look into the matter.

=== Historic buildings razed ===
In addition to 135 houses, the demolition destroyed the Bou Medyan zaouia and the Sheikh Eid Mosque, both of which supposedly date back to the time of Saladin. In destroying the small mosque near the Buraq section of the Wall, associated with the ascent of Mohammad on his steed Buraq to heaven, the engineer Ben Moshe is quoted as having exclaimed: "Why shouldn't the mosque be sent to Heaven, just as the magic horse did?"

Two years later, another complex of buildings close to the wall, that included Madrasa Fakhriya (Fakhriyyah zawiyya) and the house in front of the Bab al-Magharibah that the Abu al-Sa'ud family had built and inhabited since the 16th century but which had been spared in the 1967 destruction, were demolished in June 1969. The Abu al-Sa'ud building was a well-known example of Mamluk architecture, and there were several reasons given for its demolition. Its removal enabled Israeli archaeologists to excavate in the area; to provide open ground to enable the IDF to access the area rapidly should troubles arise at the Wall, and finally, while the antiquity of the housing complex was admitted, the fact too that extensive repairs to the roof and balconies had been made using railway track beams and concrete was adduced to assert that they had sufficient modern traces to be accidental to the area's history. Yasser Arafat's mother was of al-Sa'ud heritage, and it appears that Arafat had lived in the house during his childhood, in the years 1933 to 1936.

On 12 June, at a Ministerial Meeting on the Status of Jerusalem, when the issue of demolitions in the Old City was broached, the Justice Minister Ya'akov Shapira judged that: "They are illegal demolitions but it's good that they are being done." Lieutenant Colonel Yaakov Salman, the deputy military governor in charge of the operation, aware of possible legal trouble on account of the Fourth Geneva Convention forearmed himself with documents from the East Jerusalem municipality testifying to the poor sanitary conditions in the neighborhood and Jordanian plans to eventually evacuate it. The demolition of civilian homes and religious property in occupied territory was later condemned by international legal authorities as a violation of Article 53 of the Fourth Geneva Convention and the Hague Convention for the Protection of Cultural Property in the Event of Armed Conflict. Following the war, the United Nations Security Council passed Resolution 252, declaring all legislative and administrative measures taken by Israel to alter the status of Jerusalem, including the expropriation of land and properties, to be legally invalid. By the 14th, some 200,000 Israelis had come to visit the site.

=== Aftermath ===
On 18 April 1968, the Israeli government expropriated the land for public use and paid from 100 to 200 Jordanian dinars to each family that had been displaced. 41 heads of families who had been evicted from the area wrote to Kollek to thank him for his assistance in resettling them in better housing conditions. (Note: The letter dated 8 January 1973 reads:"Mr. Kollek: We, the undersigned, who constitute part of the residents of the Jewish Quarter and of the Mughrabi Quarter in the Old City, who were evacuated from our homes there as a result of the six-day-war, wish to thank His Honor, as well as Mr. Meron Benvenisti, in charge of East Jerusalem, and Mr. Faris Ayub, head of the public relations bureau in the eastern part of the city, for the financial aid and human care which was extended and is still being extended to us, which impressed us profoundly and which afforded us and our families more decent alternative accommodations. We pray God will grant you long life and a continuance of your good deeds." (Alexander & Kittrie 1973, p. 275)) The rest of the families have refused compensation on the grounds that it would lend legitimacy to what Israel did to them.

In the post-1967 period, many of the evicted refugees managed to emigrate to Morocco via Amman due to the intervention of King Hassan II. Other refugee families resettled in the Shu'afat refugee camp and other parts of Jerusalem. The prayer site was extended southwards to double its length from 28 to 60 meters, and the original plaza of four meters to 40 meters: the small 120 square meter area in front of the wall became the Western Wall Plaza, now in use as an open-air synagogue covering 20,000 square meters.

In a letter to the United Nations, the Israeli government stated nine months later that the buildings were demolished after the Jordanian government had allowed the neighborhood to become a slum area.

The expelled community continues to elect an administrator or mukhtar for the no-longer existing Mughrabi Quarter.

In early 2023, salvage excavations conducted beneath the Western Wall Plaza by the Israel Antiquities Authority uncovered architectural remains of the razed Mughrabi Quarter, including walls nearly a metre high, painted plaster, a cobbled courtyard, and a drainage network. Palestinian officials, residents, and heritage non-governmental organisations condemned the ongoing digging, expressing concern that the subterranean works were intended to expand underground prayer spaces and tourist facilities while physically erasing the surviving foundations of the historic neighborhood.

== Interpretations ==
According to Gershom Gorenberg,

The action fit the pre-state strategy of the Zionist left, which believed in speaking softly and "creating facts"; using faits accomplis to determine the political future of disputed land.

== Sources ==
- Abowd, Thomas Philip (2000). "The Moroccan Quarter: A History of the Present". Jerusalem Quarterly (7): 6–16. doi:10.70190/jq.I7.p6.
- Abowd, Thomas Philip (2014). Colonial Jerusalem: The Spatial Construction of Identity and Difference in a City of Myth: 1948-2012. Syracuse University Press. ISBN 978-0-815-65261-8.
- al-Tijani, Noura (August 2007). "The Moroccan Community in Palestine". This Week in Palestine. No. 112. Archived from the original on 22 August 2007.
- Alexander, Yonah; Kittrie, Nicholas N. (1973). Crescent and star: Arab & Israeli perspectives on the Middle East conflict. AMS Press.
- Ben-Arieh, Yehoshua (1984). Jerusalem in the Nineteenth Century. St. Martin's Press/ Yad Ben Zvi Institute. ISBN 978-0-312-44187-6.
- Ben-Layashi, Samir; Maddy-Weitzman, Bruce (2015). "Myth, History and Realpolitik: Morocco and its Jewish community". In Abramson, Glenda (ed.). Sites of Jewish Memory: Jews in and From Islamic Lands. Routledge. pp. 3–19. ISBN 978-1-317-75160-1.
- Burgoyne, Michael Hamilton (1987). Mamluk Jerusalem. ISBN 090503533-X.
- Chateaubriand, François-René (1812). Travels in Greece, Palestine, Egypt, and Barbary During the Years 1806 and 1807. Vol. 2. Henry Colburn – via Internet Archive.
- Cohen, Amnon; Lewis, Bernard (2015) [First published 1978]. Population and Revenue in the Towns of Palestine in the Sixteenth Century. Princeton University Press. ISBN 978-1-400-86779-0.
- Dumper, Michael (1997). The Politics of Jerusalem Since 1967. Columbia University Press. ISBN 978-0-585-38871-7.
- El-Haj, Nadia Abu (2008). Facts on the Ground: Archaeological Practice and Territorial Self-Fashioning in Israeli Society. University of Chicago Press. ISBN 978-0-226-00215-6.
- "Fears for remains of Jerusalem's lost Mughrabi quarter". France 24. Agence France-Presse. 12 February 2023.
- Freas, Erik (2018). Nationalism and the Haram al-Sharif/Temple Mount: The Exclusivity of Holiness. Palgrave Macmillan. ISBN 978-3-319-49920-8.
- Gilbert, Martin (1996). "War, 1914–1917". Jerusalem in the Twentieth Century. Wiley. ISBN 978-0-471-16308-4 – via Internet Archive.
- Gilbert, Martin (2008). The Routledge Historical Atlas of Jerusalem: Fourth Edition. Routledge. p. 27. ISBN 978-0-415-43343-3.
- Gorenberg, Gershom (2007). The Accidental Empire: Israel and the Birth of the Settlements, 1967-1977. Macmillan Publishers. ISBN 978-1-466-80054-0.
- Hasson, Nit (15 June 2012). "Rare photograph reveals ancient Jerusalem mosque destroyed in 1967". Haaretz.
- Hiltermann, Joost R. (1995). "Teddy Kollek and the Native Question". In Moors, Annelies; van Teeffelen, Toine; Kanaana, Sharif; Ghazaleh, Ilham Abu (eds.). Discourse and Palestine: Power, Text and Context. Het Spinhuis. pp. 55–65. ISBN 978-9-055-89010-1.
- Hulme, David (2006). Identity, Ideology and the Future of Jerusalem. Palgrave Macmillan. ISBN 978-1-137-06474-5.
- Kabalo, Paula (1 May 2018). "City with No Walls: David Ben-Gurion's Jerusalem Vision Post-June 1967". Modern Judaism – A Journal of Jewish Ideas and Experience. 38 (2): 160–182. doi:10.1093/mj/kjy003.
- Kark, Ruth; Oren-Nordheim, Michal (2001). Jerusalem and Its Environs: Quarters, Neighborhoods, Villages, 1800-1948. Wayne State University Press. ISBN 978-0-814-32909-2.
- Khalidi, Rashid (1992). "The future of Arab Jerusalem Pages". British Journal of Middle Eastern Studies. 19 (2): 133–143. doi:10.1080/13530199208705557.
- Klein, Menachem (2014). Lives in Common: Arabs and Jews in Jerusalem, Jaffa and Hebron. Oxford University Press. ISBN 978-0-199-39626-9.
- Laurens, Henry (1999). L'invention de la Terre sainte (1799-1922). La Question de Palestine. Vol. 1. Paris: Fayard. ISBN 978-2-213-70357-2.
- Laurens, Henry (2002). Une mission sacrée de civilisation. La Question de Palestine. Vol. 2. Paris: Fayard. ISBN 978-2-213-60349-0.
- Lemire, Vincent (2019) [First published in 2017]. "Jerusalem and the Twilight of French Algeria". In Boucheron, Patrick; Gerson, Stéphane (eds.). France in the World: A New Global History. Translated by Jane Kunz. New York: Other Press. pp. 800–806. ISBN 978-159051-941-7.
- Lemire, Vincent (2023). In the Shadow of the Wall: The Life and Death of Jerusalem's Maghrebi Quarter, 1187-1967. Stanford University Press. ISBN 978-1-503-61539-7.
- Peters, F. E. (1993). The distant shrine: the Islamic centuries in Jerusalem. AMS Press. ISBN 978-0-404-61629-8.
- Peters, F. E. (2017) [First published 1984]. Jerusalem: The Holy City in the Eyes of Chroniclers, Visitors, Pilgrims, and Prophets from the Days of Abraham to the Beginnings of Modern Times. Princeton University Press. ISBN 978-1-400-88616-6.
- Report of the Commission appointed by His Majesty's Government in the United Kingdom of Great Britain and Northern Ireland, with the approval of the Council of the League of Nations, to determine the rights and claims of Moslems and Jews in connection with the Western or Wailing Wall at Jerusalem. His Majesty's Stationery Office. 1931 – via UNISPAL.
- Ricca, Simone (2007). Reinventing Jerusalem: Israel's Reconstruction of the Jewish Quarter After 1967. I. B. Tauris. ISBN 978-1-845-11387-2.
- Ricca, Simone (2010). "Heritage, Nationalism and the Shifting Symbolism of the Wailing Wall". Archives de sciences sociales des religions (151): 169–188. CiteSeerX 10.1.1.654.3172. doi:10.4000/assr.22401.
- Robinson, Edward (1841). Biblical researches in Palestine 1838. Vol. 1. Crocker & Brewster – via HathiTrust Digital Library.
- Rossoff, Dovid (2001) [First published 1998]. Where Heaven Touches Earth: Jewish Life in Jerusalem from Medieval Times to the Present. Feldheim Publishers. ISBN 978-0-873-06879-6.
- Schama, Simon (1978). Two Rothschilds and the land of Israel. Alfred A. Knopf. ISBN 978-0-394-50137-6.
- Segev, Tom (2007). 1967. Translated by Jessica Cohen. New York: Metropolitan Books. pp. 400–401. ISBN 978-0-8050-7057-6 – via Internet Archive.
- Stockman-Shomron, Israel (1984). "Jerusalem in Islam: Faith and Politics". In Stockman-Shomron, Israel (ed.). Israel, the Middle East and the Great Powers. Shikmona Publishing Company. pp. 40–47. ISBN 978-1-412-82672-3.
- Talhami, Ghada Hashem (2017). American Presidents and Jerusalem. Lexington Books. ISBN 978-1-498-55429-9.
- Tekoah, Yosef (6 March 1968). "Letter dated 5 MARCH 1968 from the Permanent Representative of Israel to the United Nations Addressed to the Secretary General". UNISPAL – via UNISPAL.
- Tibawi, Abdul Latif (1978). The Islamic Pious Foundations in Jerusalem: Origins, History and Usurpation by Israel. London: Islamic Cultural Centre.
