= Gates of the Old City of Jerusalem =

Historical entrances through the Walls of Jerusalem

Gates of the Old City of Jerusalem: 1. Jaffa: 2. Zion; 3. Dung; 4. Golden (walled up); 5. Lions; 6. Herod; 7. Damascus; 8. New Gate; Quarters: Christian Armenian Jewish Muslim Temple Mount

This article lists the gates of the Old City of Jerusalem. The gates are visible on most old maps of Jerusalem over the last 1,500 years.

During different periods, the city walls followed different outlines and had a varying number of gates. During the era of the crusader Kingdom of Jerusalem (1099–1291), Jerusalem had four gates, one on each side.

The current walls of the Old City of Jerusalem were built between 1533 and 1540 on orders of Ottoman Sultan Suleiman the Magnificent, who provided them with seven gates: six new gates were built, and the older and previously sealed Golden Gate was reopened (only to be re-sealed again after a few years). The seven gates at the time of Suleiman were, clockwise and by their current name: the Damascus Gate; Herod's Gate; Lions' Gate; Golden Gate; Dung Gate; Zion Gate; and Jaffa Gate.

With the re-sealing of the Golden Gate by Suleiman, the number of operational gates was only brought back to seven in 1887, with the addition of the New Gate.

Until 1887, each gate was closed before sunset and opened at sunrise.

== List ==
The seven gates at the time after Suleiman's reconstruction were: Damascus Gate; Golden Gate; Herod's Gate; Jaffa Gate; Lions' Gate; Silwan Gate (also known as Mughrabi Gate, and now as Dung Gate); and Zion Gate. After the re-sealing of the Golden Gate already in Suleiman's time, the number of operational gates was only brought back to seven with the addition of the New Gate in 1887.

| English | Hebrew | Arabic | Alternative names | Construction year | Location | Status | Image |
|---|---|---|---|---|---|---|---|
| Golden Gate | Sha'ar HaRahamim שער הרחמים "Gate Of Mercy" | Bab al-Dhahabi / al-Zahabi, "Golden Gate" باب الذهبي | A double gate, last sealed in 1541. In Arabic also known as the Gate of Eternal Life. In Arabic each door has its own name: Gate of Mercy, Bab al-Rahma (باب الرحمة) – the southern door; Gate of Repentance, Bab al-Taubah (باب التوبة) – the northern door | 6th century | Northern third of eastern side | Sealed | Gate in Jerusalem |
| Damascus Gate | Sha'ar Shkhem שער שכם "Nablus Gate" | Bab al-Amoud باب العمود | Sha'ar Damesek, Nablus Gate, Gate of the Pillar | 1537 | Middle of northern wall | Open | Gate in Jerusalem |
| Herod's Gate | Sha'ar HaPerachim שער הפרחים "Gate Of The Flowers" | Bab al-Sahira باب الساهرة | Sha'ar Hordos, Flower Gate, Sheep Gate | 1537; greatly expanded in 1875 | East part of northern wall | Open | Gate in Jerusalem |
| Dung Gate / Silwan Gate / Maghrabi Gate | Sha'ar HaAshpot שער האשפות "Gate Of Trash" | Bab al-Maghariba باب المغاربة | Gate of Silwan, Sha'ar HaMugrabim | 1538–40 | East part of southern wall | Open | Gate in Jerusalem |
| Lions' Gate | Sha'ar HaArayot שער האריות | Bab al-Asbatt باب الأسباط | Gate of Yehoshafat, St. Stephen's Gate, Gate of the Tribes, St. Mary's Gate (باب ستي مريم, Bab Sittna Maryam) | 1538–39 | North part of eastern wall | Open | Gate in Jerusalem |
| Jaffa Gate | Sha'ar Yafo שער יפו | Bab al-Khalil باب الخليل | The Gate of David's Prayer Shrine, Porta Davidi | 1530–40 | Middle of western wall | Open | Gate in Jerusalem |
| Zion Gate | Sha'ar Tzion שער ציון | Bab al-Nabi Da'oud باب النبي داود | Gate to the Jewish Quarter | 1540 | Middle of southern wall | Open | Gate in Jerusalem |
| New Gate | HaSha'ar HeHadash השער החדש | Al-Bab al-Jedid الباب الجديد | Gate of Hammid | 1887 | West part of northern wall | Open | Gate in Jerusalem |

== Previous gates ==
A smaller entrance, popularly known as the Tanners' Gate, has been opened for visitors after being discovered and unsealed during excavations in the 1990s.

Sealed historic gates, other than the Golden Gate, comprise three that are at least partially preserved (the Single, Triple, and Double Gates in the southern wall), with several other gates discovered by archaeologists of which only traces remain (the so-called Gate of the Essenes on Mount Zion, the gate of Herod's royal palace south of the citadel, and the vague remains of what 19th-century explorers identified as the Gate of the Funerals (Bab al-Jana'iz) or of al-Buraq (Bab al-Buraq) south of the Golden Gate).

| English | Hebrew | Arabic | Alternative names | Construction year | Location | Status | Image |
|---|---|---|---|---|---|---|---|
| "Tanners' Gate" | Sha'ar HaBursekaim שער הבורסקאים | | | 12th century | East part of southern wall | Open | Gate in Jerusalem |
| Excavators' Gate | | | Excavation Gate. (Eastern gate of the main Umayyad palace, attributed to Caliph Al-Walid I (705–715). Destroyed by an earthquake around 749, walled up when the Ottoman wall was built (1537–41), reopened and rebuilt by archaeologists led by Benjamin Mazar and Meir Ben-Dov in 1968.) | 705–715, 1968 | Wall south of Al-Aqsa Mosque | Open | |
| Single Gate | | | This gate led to the underground area of the Temple Mount known as Solomon's Stables | Herodian period | Southern wall of Temple Mount | Sealed | Gate in Jerusalem |
| Huldah Gates | Sha'arei Chulda שערי חולדה | | Two gates: The Triple Gate, as it comprises three arches. Also known as Bab an-Nabi (باب النبي, "Gate of the Prophet Muhammad"); The Double Gate, two arches, partially hidden from view by mediaeval building | Herodian period | Southern wall of Temple Mount | Sealed | Gate in Jerusalem |

== In culture ==
In his book Stirring Times: Or Records from Jerusalem Consular Chronicles of 1853 to 1856, James Finn described a custom that took place in the 19th century concerning the city gates. According to him, whenever the Ottoman Sultan died, the keys to the city gates were brought to the Jews. They would offer prayers over them and anoint them with perfumes, after which the keys were returned to the Muslim authorities. The Muslims permitted this practice, as some believed that the blessing of the "Children of Israel" was "worth having".

== See also ==
- Gates of the Temple Mount
- Walls of Jerusalem
