= Damascus Gate =

Gate of the Old City of Jerusalem

- שַׁעַר שְׁכֶם (Hebrew) باب العامود (Arabic)
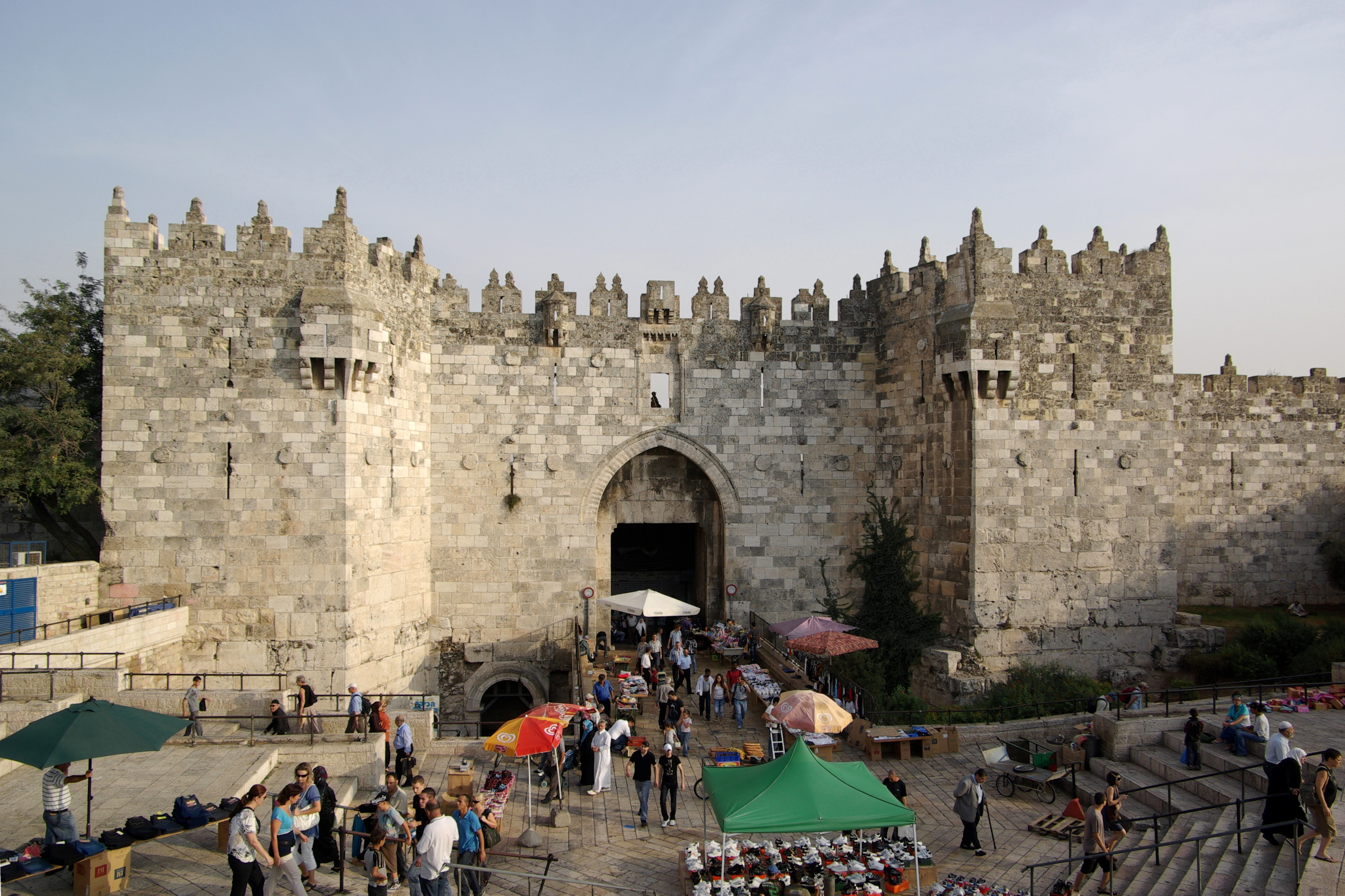

- Location within Old City of Jerusalem
- Former names: St. Stephen's Gate (Latin: Porta Sancti Stephani; Crusader period)

General information
- Location: Jerusalem
- Coordinates: 31°46′53.9″N 35°13′49.8″E
- Completed: 1537

The Damascus Gate is one of the main Gates of the Old City of Jerusalem. It is located in the wall on the city's northwest side and connects to a highway leading out to Nablus, which in the Hebrew Bible was called Shechem or Sichem, and from there, in times past, to the capital of Syria, Damascus; as such, its modern English name is the Damascus Gate, and its modern Hebrew name is Sha'ar Shkhem (שער שכם), meaning Shechem Gate, or in modern terms Nablus Gate. Of its historic Arabic names, Bāb al-Naṣr (باب النصر) means "gate of victory", and the current one, Bāb al-ʿĀmūd (باب العامود), means "gate of the column". The latter, in use continuously since at least as early as the 10th century, preserves the memory of a Roman column towering over the square behind the gate and dating to the 2nd century CE.

== History ==
In its current form, the gate was built in 1537 under the rule of Suleiman the Magnificent; however, a gate is known to have been located in the same spot since the Roman period.

=== Roman and Byzantine periods ===
Beneath the current gate, the remains of an earlier gate can be seen, dating back to the time of the Roman Emperor Hadrian who visited the region in 129/130 CE. It is dated by most archaeologists to the second century CE. In the square behind this gate stood a Roman victory column topped by a statue of Emperor Hadrian, as depicted on the 6th-century Madaba Map. This historical detail is preserved in the current gate's Arabic name, Bab el-Amud, meaning "gate of the column". On the lintel of the gate is inscribed the city's Roman name after 130 CE, Aelia Capitolina.

Until the latest excavations (1979–1984), some researchers believed that Hadrian's gate was preceded by one erected by Agrippa I (r. 41–44 CE) as part of the so-called Third Wall. However, recent research seems to prove that the gate does not predate the Roman reconstruction of the city as Aelia Capitolina, during the first half of the second century.

Hadrian's Roman gate was built as a free-standing triumphal gate, and only sometime towards the end of the 3rd or the very beginning of the 4th century were there protective walls built around Jerusalem, connecting to the existing gate.

=== Early Muslim and Crusader periods ===
The Roman gate remained in use during the Early Muslim and Crusader period, but several storerooms were added by the Crusaders outside the gate, so that access to the city became possible only by passing through those rooms. Several phases of construction work on the gate took place during the early 12th century (first Crusader Kingdom of Jerusalem, 1099–1187), the early Ayyubid period (1187–1192), and the 13th-century second phase of Crusader rule over Jerusalem. The Crusader barbican consisted mainly in an outer gatehouse opening to the east, and connected to the central portal of the Roman gate by an L-shaped courtyard enclosed by massive walls. The barbican was destroyed twice, in 1219/20 by al-Mu'azzam 'Isa when he tore down all fortifications in Palestine, and in 1239 by an-Nasir Da'ud.

==== Names ====
The Damascus Gate is the only Jerusalem gate to have preserved its Arabic name, Bab al-Amud ('Gate of the Column'), since at least the 10th century. The Crusaders called it St. Stephen's Gate (in Latin, Porta Sancti Stephani), highlighting its proximity to the site of martyrdom of Saint Stephen, marked since the time of Empress Eudocia by a church and monastery which lies outside the city walls. A 1523 account of a visit to Jerusalem by a Jewish traveller from Leghorn uses the name Bâb el 'Amud and notes its proximity to the Cave of Zedekiah.

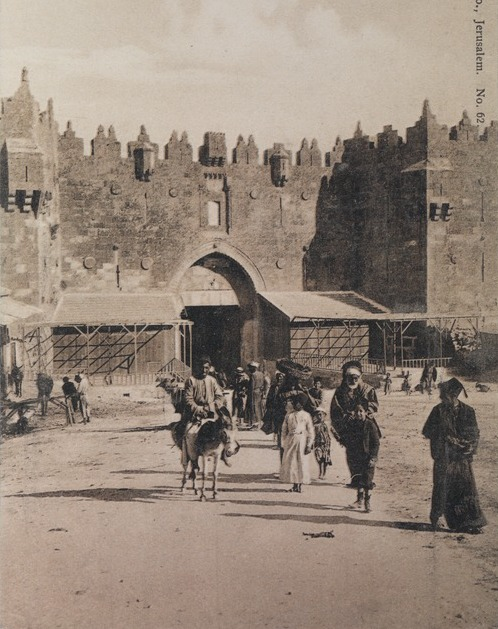
The gate from outside the walls, 1904–1908

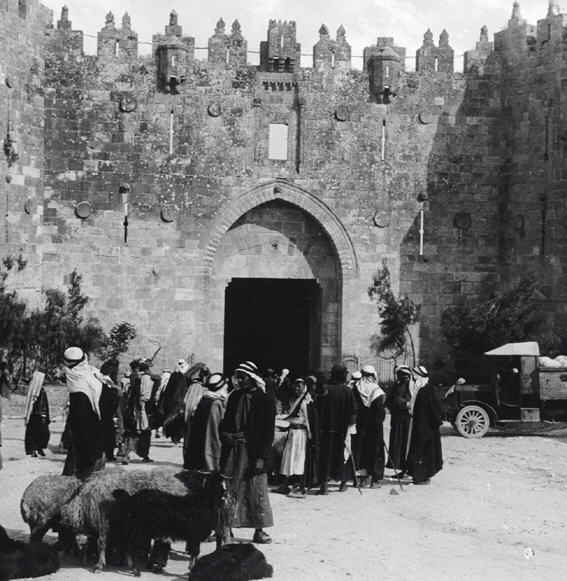
Damascus Gate northern facade, 1920

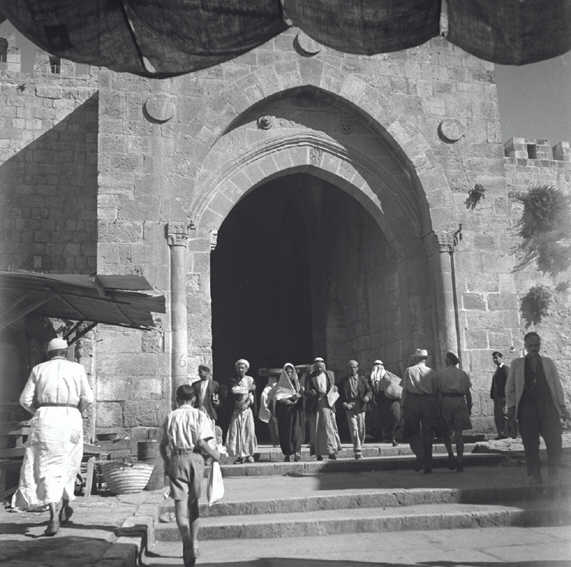
The Damascus Gate from inside the walls, 1945

== Description ==
The Damascus Gate is flanked by two towers, each equipped with machicolations. It offers access from the north to the Arab bazaar (souk) in the Muslim Quarter. In contrast to the Jaffa Gate, where stairs rise towards the gate, at the Damascus Gate the stairs descend towards the gate. Until 1967, a crenellated turret loomed over the gate, but it was damaged in the fighting that took place in and around the Old City during the Six-Day War. In August 2011, the Israeli authorities restored the turret, including its arrowslit, with the help of photos taken in the early twentieth century when the British Empire controlled Jerusalem. Eleven anchors fasten the restored turret to the wall, and four stone slabs combine to form the crenellated top.

Directly below the current, 16th-century gate, an older gate is partially visible, thought to have been first erected as a triumphal gate for the visit of the Roman emperor Hadrian in 129/130 CE. Italian architect and engineer, Ermete Pierotti, who served under the Jerusalem governor Surraya Pasha (1857–1863), thought the gate to be identical with the 'North Gate' described by Josephus, through which the Jews made a sortie to disturb Titus' first reconnaissance of the city.

== Archaeology ==
=== Roman gate and plaza; Crusader gate ===
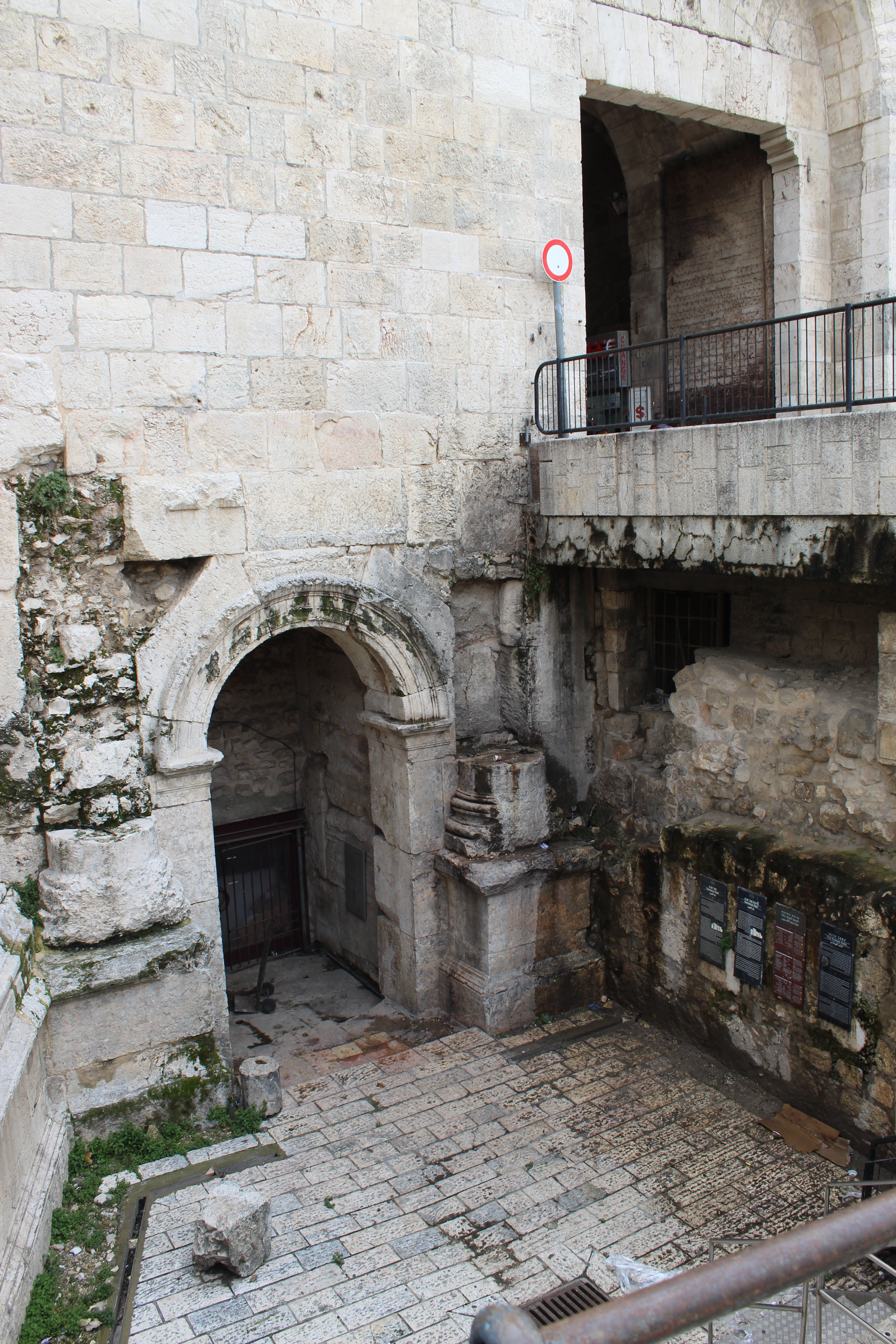
Remains of Roman-period gate under Damascus Gate

J.B. Hennessy and C.M. Bennett of the British School of Archaeology excavated in 1964–1966 next to Damascus Gate and exposed the facade of the Roman gate's eastern opening, and the Crusader-period outer gate or barbican. Menachem Magen directed a dig in 1979–1984, revealing the entire eastern gate opening, as well as the remains of the towers east and west of the gate and the pavement of the plaza opening up behind (south of) the gateway. The exact extent of the Roman plaza inside the gate is not known, even after the 2013 salvage excavation conducted by Zubair Adawi for the Israel Antiquities Authority (IAA) under a house approximately 40 m south of Damascus Gate. The large paving slabs he unearthed were probably part of the plaza's pavement, but it cannot be ruled out that they were laid out in one of the streets radiating south of it. Excavations have revealed that construction within the Damascus Gate continued under the Byzantine emperor, Justinian I.

== Culture and literature ==
Damascus Gate, video

The Damascus Gate is a cultural icon in much of Palestinian literature and culture. It has folkloric and sentimental value to many Palestinians which includes imagery of women selling baladi products and coffee shops in the square.

Damascus Gate is the title of Robert Stone's 1998 novel, set in Jerusalem at the turn of the millennium.

== Violent confrontations ==
Nazmi Jubeh, a professor at Birzeit University, said of Damascus Gate, "[It] has become a symbol for the Palestinian national struggle because of its accessibility to Palestinians and the main connecting point for both worshippers and for markets." Damascus Gate has been an ongoing site of violent confrontations between Palestinians and Israeli soldiers and police. In 2016, there were more than 15 attacks at the gate. The Washington Post published an article that year, entitled "Jerusalem's ancient Damascus Gate is at the heart of a modern wave of violence".

In April 2021, Israeli police closed the staired plaza outside the gate, a traditional holiday gathering spot for Palestinians. The closure triggered violent night clashes; the barricades were removed after several days.

On 18 October 2021, at least 22 Palestinians were wounded and 25 arrested. Since 10 October, when Jerusalem Municipality renewed excavations of graves in the historic Muslim Bab al-Asbat Cemetery near the Old City, mounting Palestinian anger led to daily arrests.

== See also ==
- Bezetha
- Herod's Gate
- Zedekiah's Cave
