= Walls of Jerusalem =

UNESCO World Heritage Site
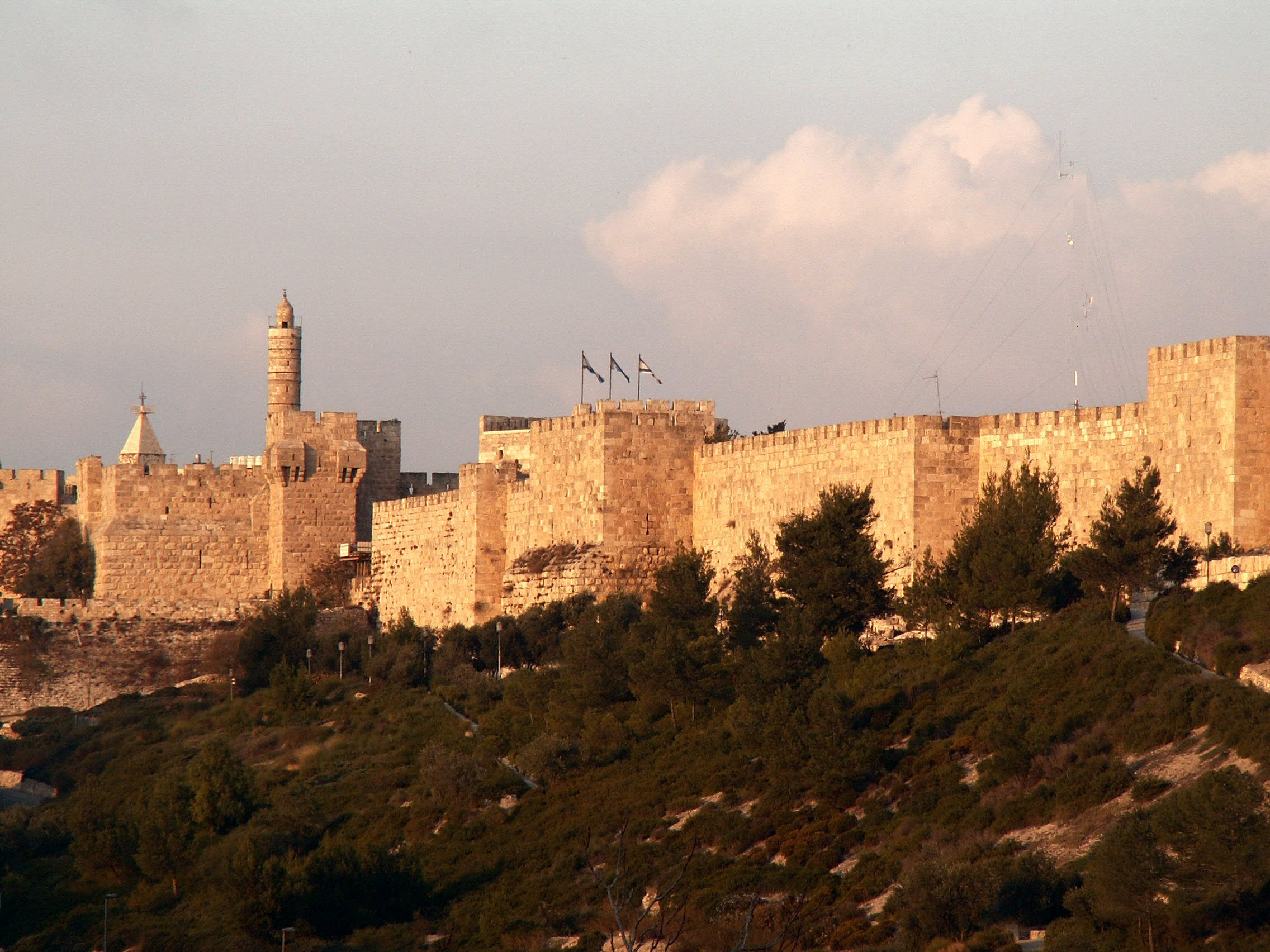
- Interactive map of Walls of Jerusalem
- Location: Jerusalem
- Part of: Old City of Jerusalem and its Walls
- Criteria: Cultural: (ii), (iii), (vi)
- Reference: 148rev
- Inscription: 1981 (5th Session)
- Endangered: 1982–...
- Coordinates: 31°47′N 35°13′E
- Site proposed by Jordan

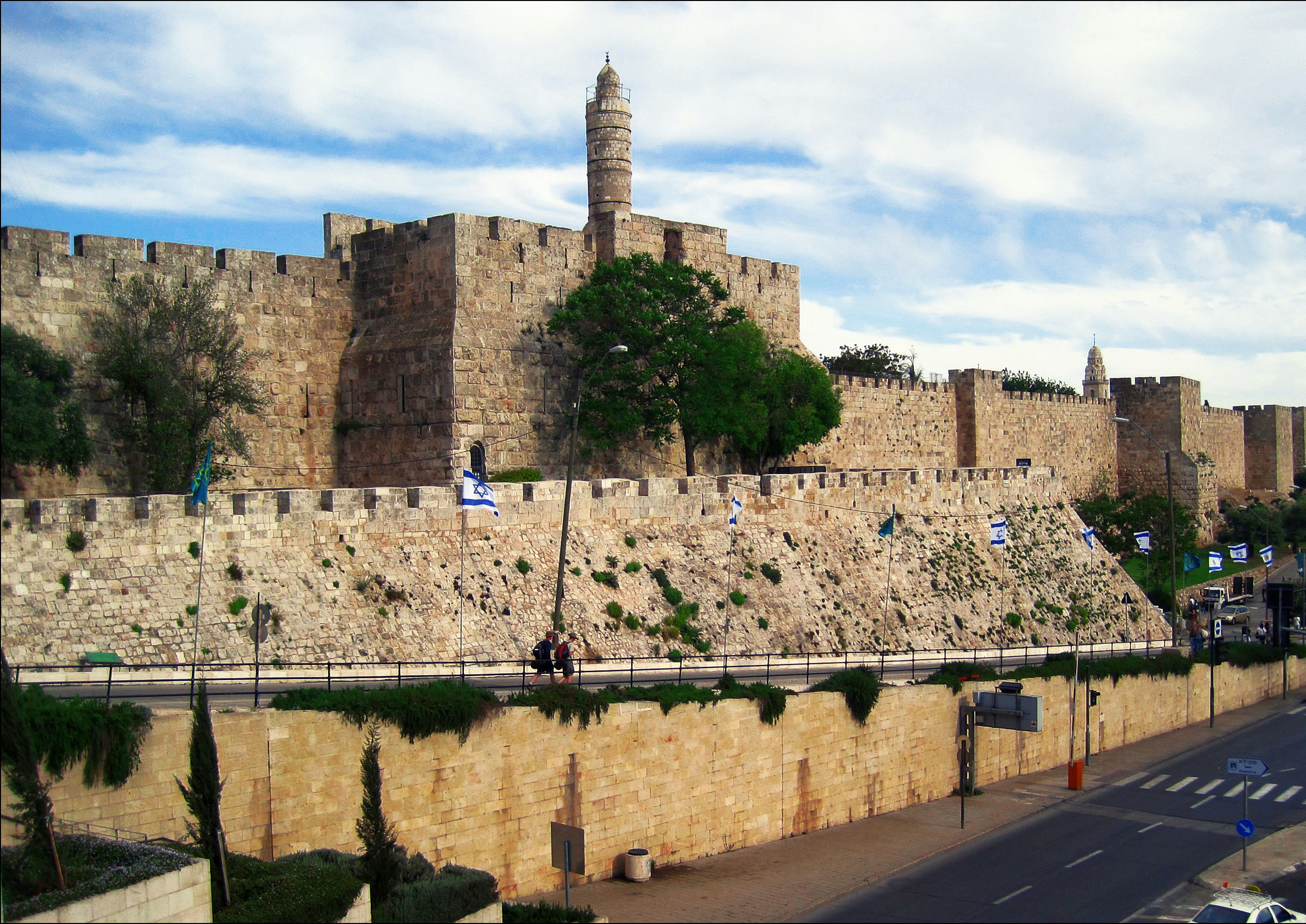
The 16th century walls of Jerusalem, with the Jerusalem Citadel minaret

The Walls of Jerusalem (Hebrew: חומות ירושלים, Arabic: أسوار القدس) surround the Old City of Jerusalem (approx. 1 km^{2}). In 1535, when Jerusalem was part of the Ottoman Empire, Sultan Suleiman the Magnificent ordered the ruined city walls to be rebuilt. The walls were constructed between 1537 and 1541. The walls are visible on most old maps of Jerusalem over the last 500 years.

The length of the walls is 4,018 meters (2.497 miles), their average height is 12 meters (39 feet) and the average thickness is 2.5 meters (8.2 feet). The walls contain 34 watchtowers and seven main gates open for traffic, with two minor gates reopened by archaeologists.

In 1981, the Jerusalem walls were added, along with the Old City of Jerusalem, to the UNESCO World Heritage Site list.

== Pre-Israelite city ==
The city of Jerusalem has been surrounded by defensive walls since ancient times. In the Middle Bronze Age, a period also known in biblical terms as the era of the Patriarchs, a city named Jebus was built on the southeastern hill of Jerusalem, relatively small (50,000 square meters) but well fortified. Remains of its walls are located above the Siloam Tunnel. The identification of Jebus with Jerusalem has been disputed, principally by Niels Peter Lemche. Supporting his case, every non-biblical mention of Jerusalem found in the ancient Near East refers to the city as 'Jerusalem'. An example of these records are the Amarna letters which are dated to the 14th century BCE, several of which were written by the chieftain of Jerusalem Abdi-Heba and call Jerusalem either Urusalim (URU ú-ru-sa-lim) or Urušalim (URU ú-ru-ša_{10}-lim) (1330s BCE). Also in the Amarna letters, it is called Beth-Shalem, the house of Shalem.

== Iron Age (ca. 1000–587/86 BCE) ==
According to Jewish tradition, as expressed in the Hebrew Bible, Jerusalem remained a Jebusite city until the rise of David, who conquered Jebus, renamed it the City of David and started expanding it. Outside today's Old City area, his city was still on the low southeastern hill. Solomon's Temple was built on the hilltop rising right above the town he had inherited, the Temple Mount, and then extended the city walls to protect it.

During the First Temple period, the city walls were extended to include the northwest hill, which is where today's Jewish and Armenian quarters are located.

The entire city was destroyed in 587/86 BCE during the siege led by Nebuchadnezzar of Babylon.

== Second Temple period ==
After the Babylonian captivity and then the Fall of Babylon, its new ruler Cyrus the Great allowed the Judahites to return to Judea and rebuild the Temple. The construction was finished in 516 BCE or 444 BCE. The Bible claims Artaxerxes I or possibly Darius II allowed Ezra and Nehemiah to return and rebuild the city's walls and to govern Judea, however there no archaeological evidence for wall building in this period, which was ruled as Yehud Medinata.

During the Second Temple period, especially during the Hasmonean period, the city walls were expanded and renovated, constituting what Josephus calls the First Wall. Herod the Great added what Josephus called the Second Wall somewhere between today's Jaffa Gate and Temple Mount. Herod Agrippa (r. 41–44 CE) later began the construction of the Third Wall, which was completed just at the beginning of the First Jewish–Roman War. Some remains of this wall are located today near the Mandelbaum Gate gas station.

In 1838, Edward Robinson surveyed and mapped prominent northern remains of the Third Wall that were subsequently lost to urban development. Decades later, during the 1920s and 1940s, Eleazar Lipa Sukenik and Leo Aryeh Mayer excavated eight disconnected segments of this fortification line farther to the east. In 2016, a salvage excavation at the Russian Compound along the wall's western flank exposed a massive Second Temple-period tower base measuring 13 by 6.7 meters, a distinct burn layer, and 79 ballista stones, providing physical evidence of the Roman assault during the 70 CE siege. GIS research conducted by Joseph Spiezer (2023) georeferenced these historical surveys and scattered excavation plans into a single coordinate system, successfully establishing a contiguous northern line that tracked eastward before turning south to connect with the northeastern corner of the Temple Mount. This comprehensive mapping demonstrates that the Third Wall brought ancient Jerusalem to its peak historical footprint of approximately 1,800 dunams (≈445 acres). Rather than enclosing a dense residential district, it secured the sparsely built Bezetha quarter, which functioned as an agricultural zone and a seasonal camping ground for festival pilgrims, relying on massive water reservoirs and an integrated livestock market to transfer sacrificial animals directly into the Temple precinct via the northern Tadi Gate^{(he)}.

== Late Roman and Byzantine periods ==
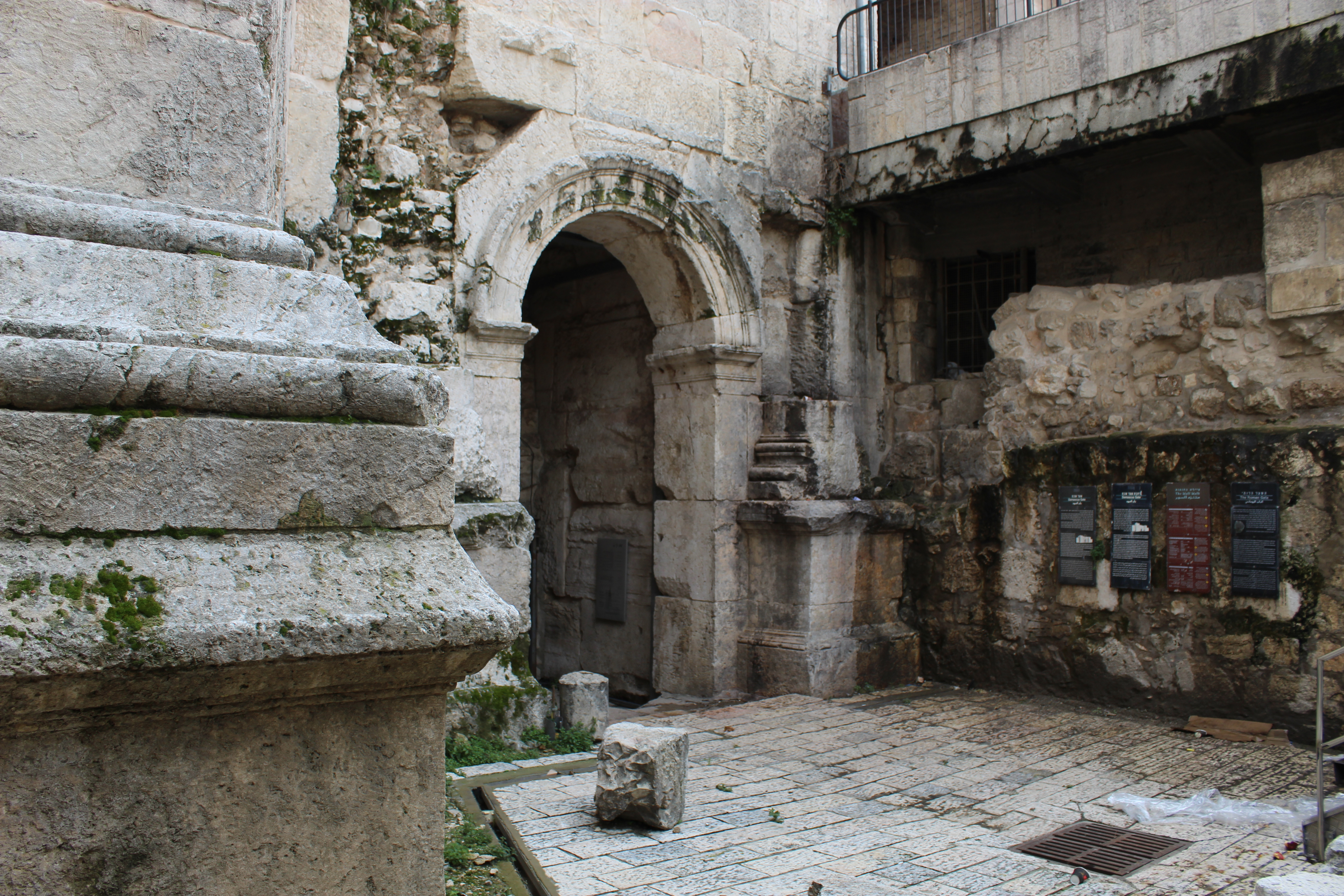
Old Roman era gate beneath the Damascus Gate in Jerusalem

In 70 CE, as a result of the Roman siege during the First Jewish–Roman War, the walls were almost completely destroyed. Jerusalem would remain in ruins for some six decades and without protective walls for over two centuries.

The pagan Roman city, Aelia Capitolina, which was built after 130 by Emperor Hadrian, was at first left without protective walls. After some two centuries without walls, a new set was erected around the city, probably during the reign of Emperor Diocletian, sometime between 289 and the turn of the century. The walls were extensively renewed by the Empress Aelia Eudocia during her banishment to Jerusalem (443–460).

== Middle Ages ==
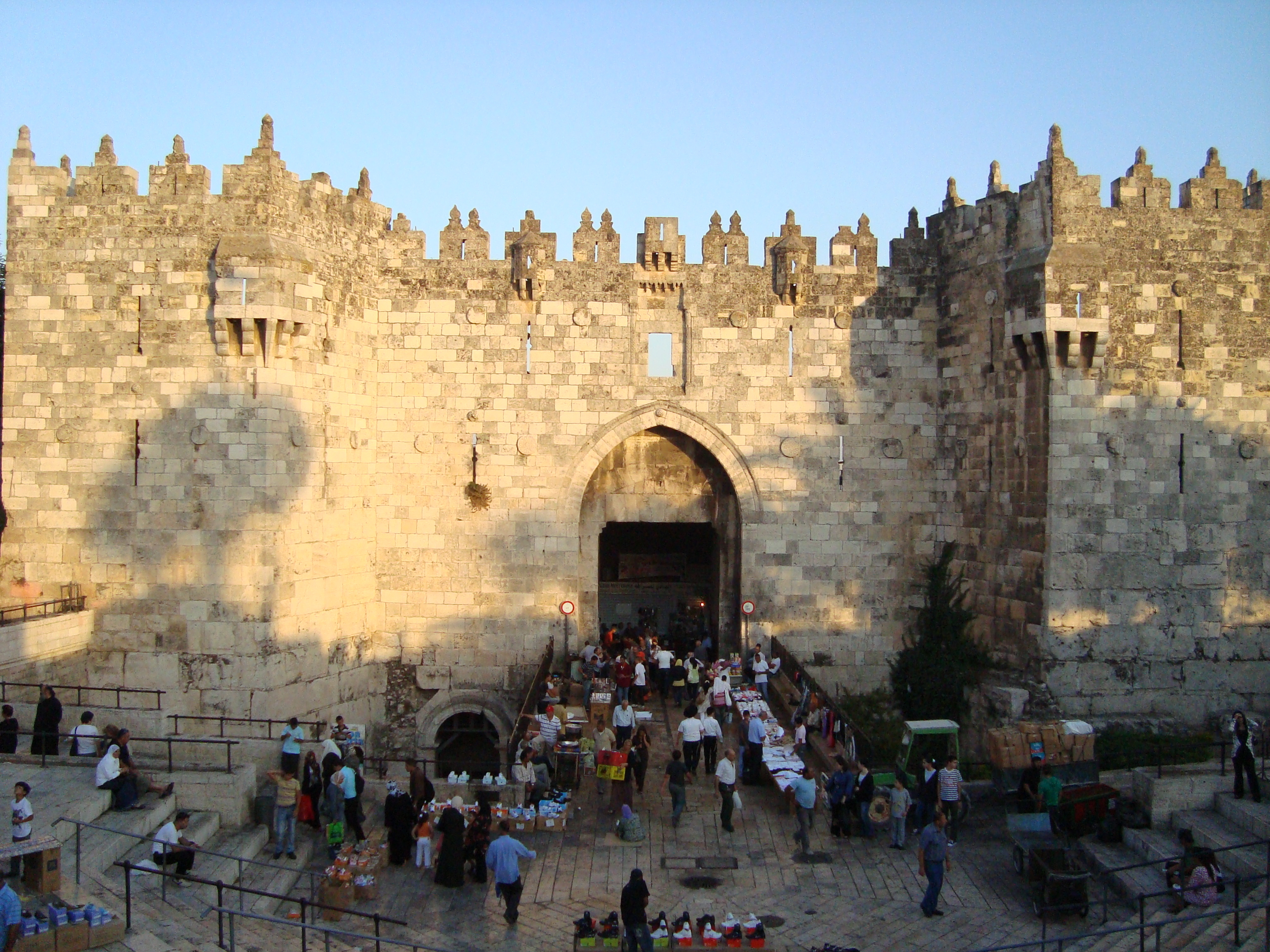
Damascus Gate with its battlements, view from north

Most of the walls constructed by Eudocia were destroyed in the 1033 Jordan Rift Valley earthquake. They had to be rebuilt by the Fatimid Caliphate, who left out the southernmost parts that had been previously included: Mount Zion with its churches, and the southeastern hill (the City of David) with the Jewish neighborhoods which stood south of the Temple Mount. In preparation for the expected Crusader siege of 1099, the walls were strengthened yet again, but to little avail. The conquest brought some destruction, followed by reconstruction, as did the reconquest by Saladin in 1187. From 1202–12, Saladin's nephew, al-Mu'azzam Isa, ordered the reconstruction of the city walls, but later on, in 1219, he reconsidered the situation after most of the watchtowers had been built and had the walls torn down, mainly because he feared that the Crusaders would benefit from the fortifications if they managed to reconquer the city. For the next three centuries, the city remained without protective walls, al-Aqsa and the Tower of David then being the only well-fortified areas.

== Ottoman period ==
In the 16th century, during the reign of the Ottoman Empire in the region, Sultan Suleiman the Magnificent decided to rebuild the city walls fully, partly on the remains of the ancient walls. Being built in circa 1537–1541, they are the walls that exist today.

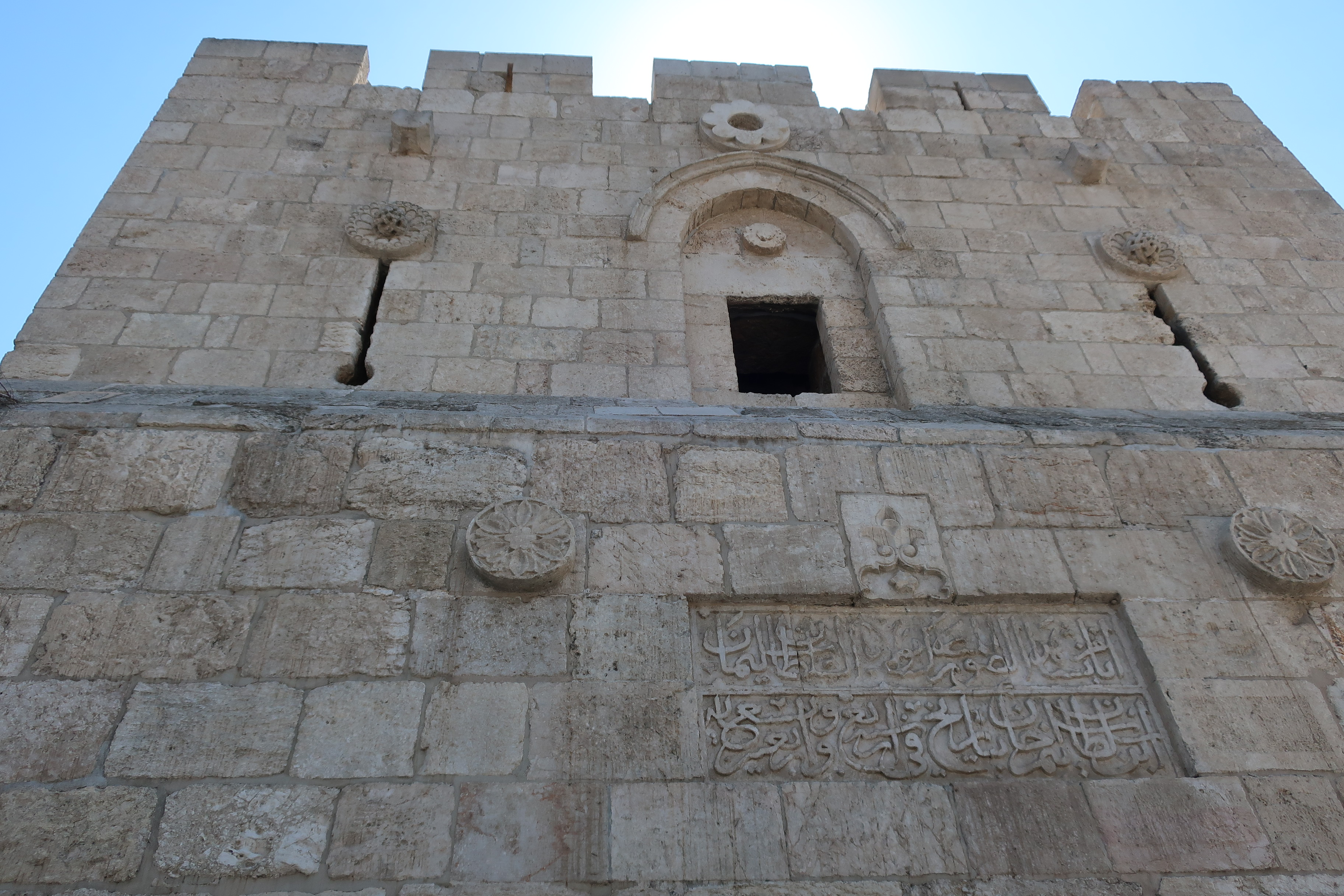
Frontage of northwestern wall in Jerusalem, with Arabic inscription

An inscription in Arabic from the reign of Suleiman the Magnificent states:

Has decreed the construction of the wall he who has protected the home of Islam with his might and main and wiped out the tyranny of idols with his power and strength, he whom alone God has enabled to enslave the necks of kings in countries (far and wide) and deservedly acquire the throne of the Caliphate, the Sultan son of the Sultan son of the Sultan son of the Sultan, Suleyman.

== Late Ottoman and British Mandate periods ==
Following their construction in the 16th century, the Ottoman walls of Jerusalem remained largely unchanged for centuries, with only minor repairs carried out after earthquakes or periods of unrest. By the late 19th century, as Jerusalem expanded beyond the Old City, the walls gradually lost their defensive role and became a symbolic boundary rather than a military one. In 1898, a breach was made in the wall near the Jaffa Gate to allow German Emperor Wilhelm II to enter Jerusalem during his official visit. This opening remains visible today and represents one of the earliest modern alterations to the Ottoman fortifications.

During the British Mandate period (1917–1948), the walls were recognized as a major historical monument. The British authorities adopted preservation-oriented policies and generally avoided structural changes. In 1922, the walls and gates were officially declared protected antiquities under the Antiquities Ordinance.

== Jordanian and Israeli periods ==
After the 1948 Arab–Israeli War, the Old City of Jerusalem, including its walls, came under Jordanian administration. Limited restoration work was undertaken during this period, and access to certain gates was restricted.

Following the 1967 Six-Day War, Israel gained control of East Jerusalem. Since then, archaeological research and conservation projects have been carried out along the walls, focusing on structural stabilization, documentation of earlier building phases, and preservation of original Ottoman masonry.

== Qasr Jalud ==
At the northwest corner of the Ottoman wall, archaeologists have discovered the meager remains of a large tower, c. 35x35 metres, probably first built in the 11th century during the Fatimid period, that fell to the Franks at the end of the First Crusade in 1099 and was expanded by the Ayyubids after Saladin's reconquest of the city in the Battle of Hattin in 1187. The tower is known in Arabic as Qasr al-Jalud "Goliath's Tower," and to the Kingdom of Jerusalem as Tancred's Tower after Tancred of Hauteville, the commander whose troops breached the Fatimid defenses at this specific point during the 1099 siege. The tower, as well as the entire city wall, were long destroyed by the time the Ottoman Turks built theirs, possibly since 1219 when Ayyubid ruler Al-Mu'azzam Isa razed most of the city fortifications.

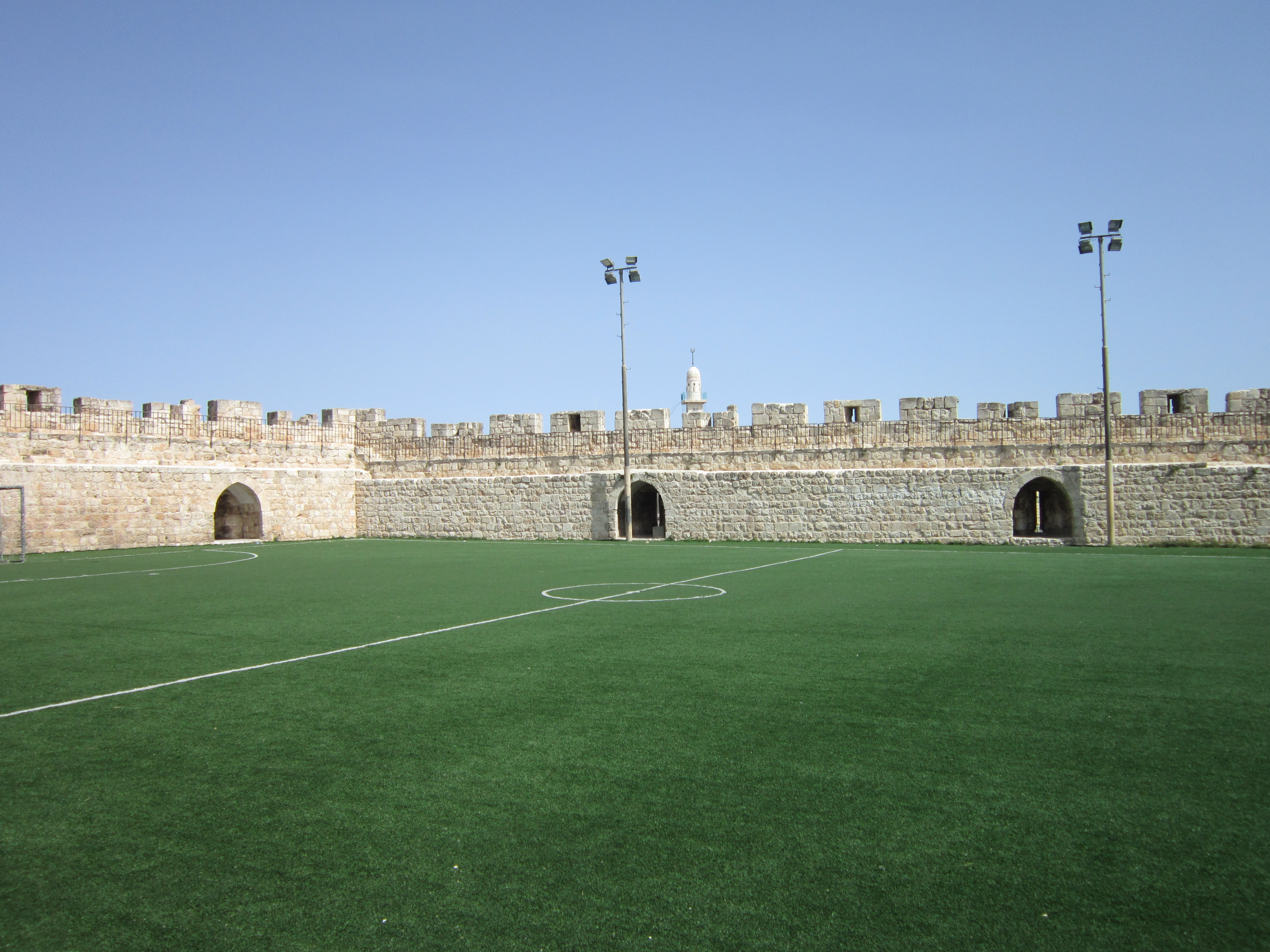
Football field with old city wall in the background, East Jerusalem

== See also ==
=== Regarding 16th-century walls ===
- Gates of the Old City of Jerusalem. Seven of the eight main gates belong to 16th-century walls.
- Mimar Sinan (1488/90-1588), Ottoman chief architect. The walls and gates of Jerusalem are attributed to him or his office, along with the mosque of Haseki Sultan Imaret.
- Clifford Holliday, Mandate-period architect who drew up a master plan for Jerusalem and the restoration of the Old City walls.

=== Not directly related ===
- Broad Wall – city wall of Jerusalem from the time of Hezekiah (ca. 700 BCE)
- Southern Wall of the Temple Mount
- Western Wall – also known as the Wailing Wall, the accessible part of the western retaining wall of the Temple Mount
- Walls of Jerusalem National Park – a national park in Tasmania, Australia named after the Walls of Jerusalem for having natural rock formations that resemble the Walls

== Sources ==
- Gibson, Shimon; Lewis, Raphael Y. (2023). "Capturing Jerusalem: the Fāṭimid/Seljȗk, Crusader, and Ayyȗbid Fortifications, Ditches, and Military Outworks of the City". Journal of Medieval Military History. XXI. Woodbridge: The Boydell Press: 1–74. ISBN 978-1-78327-750-6. ISSN 1477-545X.
- "Israeli Activities in Archaeological Sites in East Jerusalem and the West Bank. Five Case Studies" (PDF). www.ohchr.org.
