= Lions' Gate =

Gate of the Old City of Jerusalem

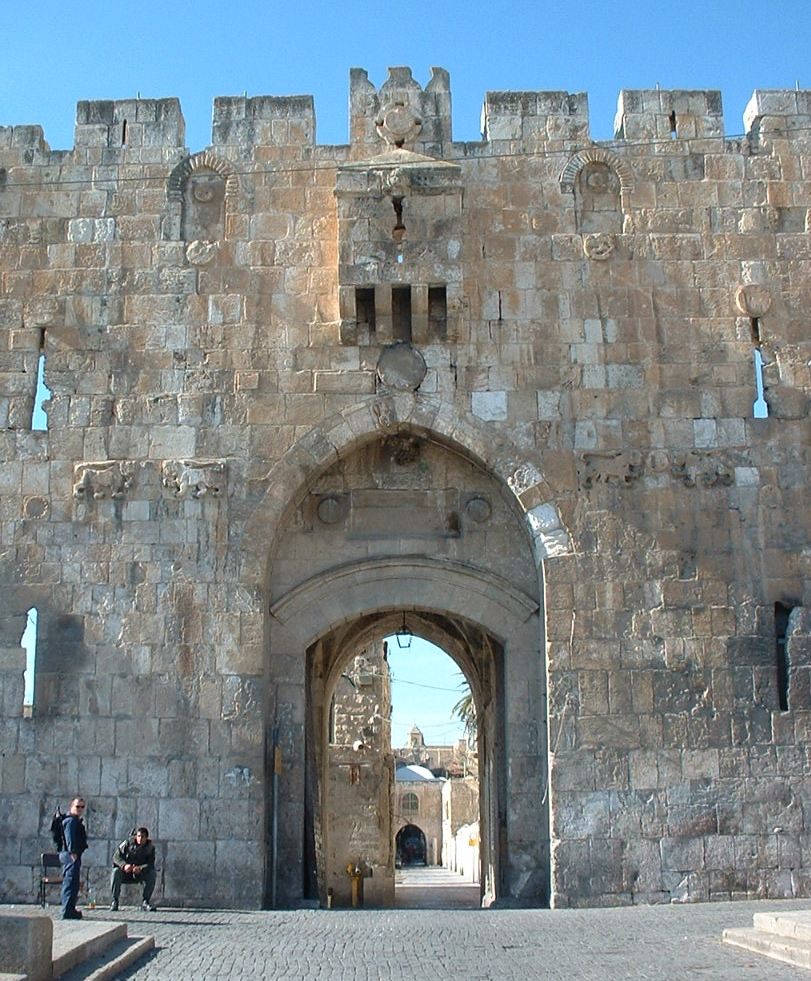
- Lions' Gate

- Location within Old City of Jerusalem
- Alternative names: St Stephen's Gate, Bab Sitti Maryam (lit. 'Gate of My Lady Mary')

General information
- Location: Jerusalem Old City, Muslim Quarter
- Coordinates: 31°46′51″N 35°14′13″E
- Completed: 1538/9 (AH 945)
- Renovated: 2012

Dimensions
- Other dimensions: Height: 13.7 m (45 ft)

Lions' Gate (Hebrew: שער האריות, romanized: Sha'ar ha-Arayot, lit. 'Lions' Gate', Arabic: باب الأسباط, romanized: Bab al-Asbat, lit. 'Gate of the Tribes'), also St Stephen's Gate, is one of the seven open Gates of the Old City of Jerusalem. It leads into the Muslim Quarter of the Old City.

== History ==
The start of the traditional Christian observance of the last walk of Jesus from prison to crucifixion, the Via Dolorosa, begins at the Lions' Gate, called St Stephen's Gate by Christians. Carved into the wall above the gate are four lions, two on the left and two on the right. Suleiman the Magnificent had the carvings made to celebrate the Ottoman defeat of the Mamluks in 1517. Legend has it that Suleiman's predecessor Selim I dreamed of lions that were going to eat him because of his plans to level the city. He was spared only after promising to protect the city by building a wall around it. This led to the lion becoming the heraldic symbol of Jerusalem.

Historian Moshe Sharon notes the similarity of the sculpted felines to similar pairs at Jisr Jindas and Qasr al-Basha in Gaza. All represent the same Mamluk sultan, Baibars. Sharon estimates that they all date to approximately 1273 C.E.

The gate is part of the city's extant walls, built by Ottoman Sultan Suleiman in 1538. The walls stretch for approximately 4.5 kilometers (2.8 mi) and rise to a height of 5–15 meters (16–49 ft), with a thickness of 3 meters (9.8 feet). Altogether, the Old City walls contain 43 surveillance towers and 11 gates, seven of which are presently open.

In 1967 during the Six Day War, it was through this gate that Israeli paratroopers broke into the Old City of Jerusalem, along with the rest of East Jerusalem and the whole West Bank, Judea and Samaria, from Jordan at the time.

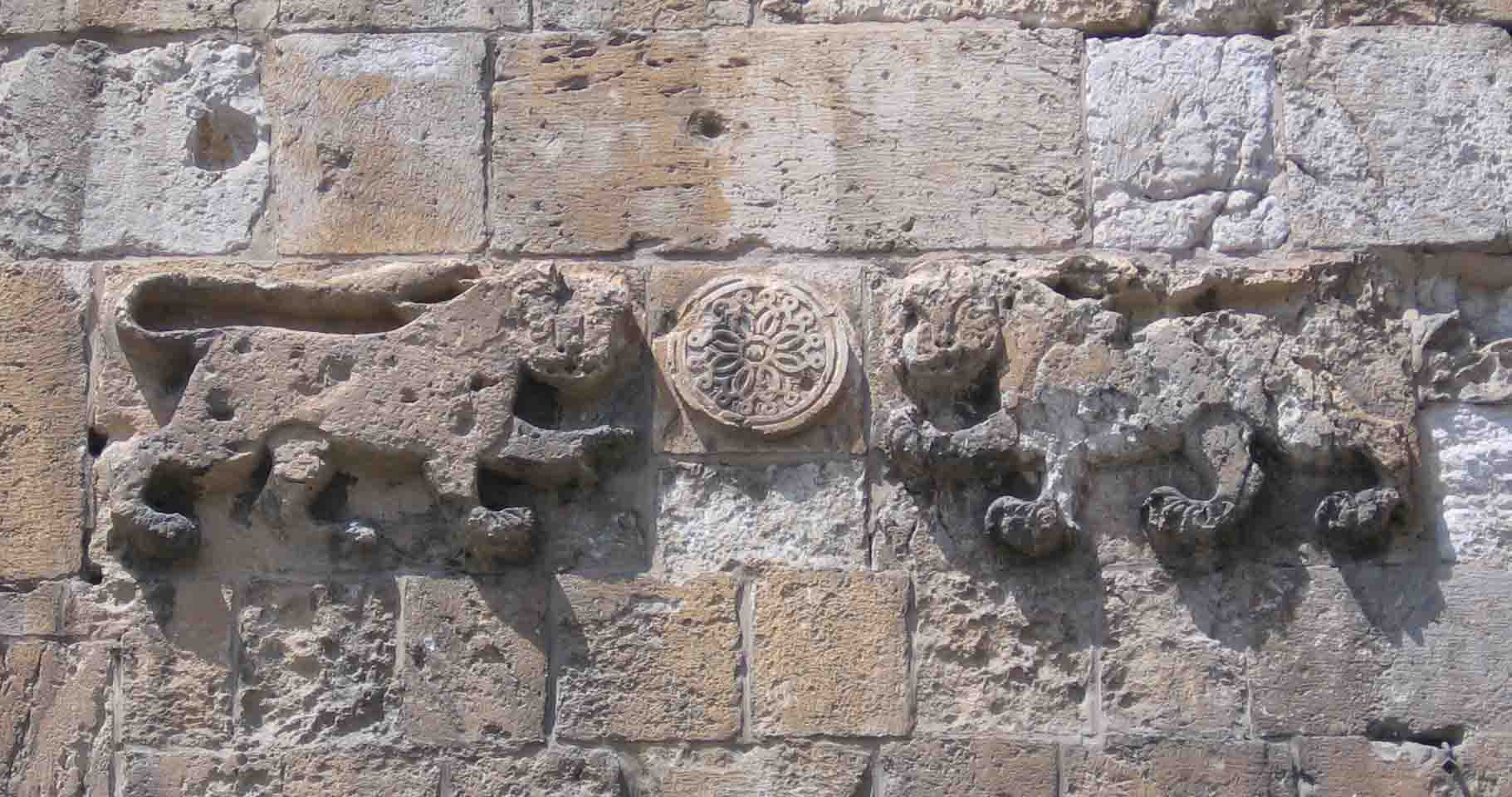
Detail of Lions' Gate carvings, actually leopards (panthers).

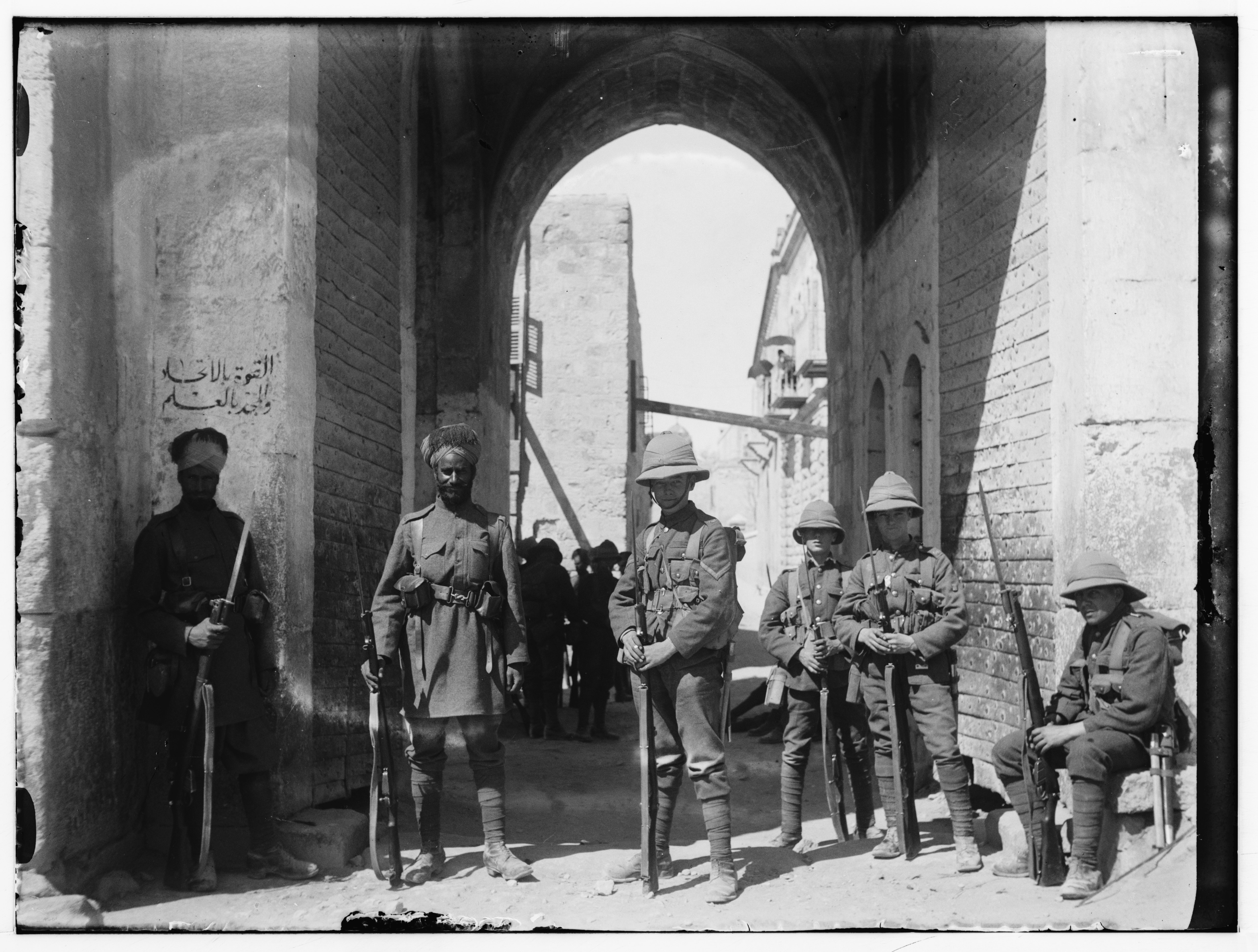
British imperial troops from India and Britain guard the gate in 1920

== See also ==
- Gates of the Old City of Jerusalem
