= Buraq =

Mythical beast in Islamic tradition

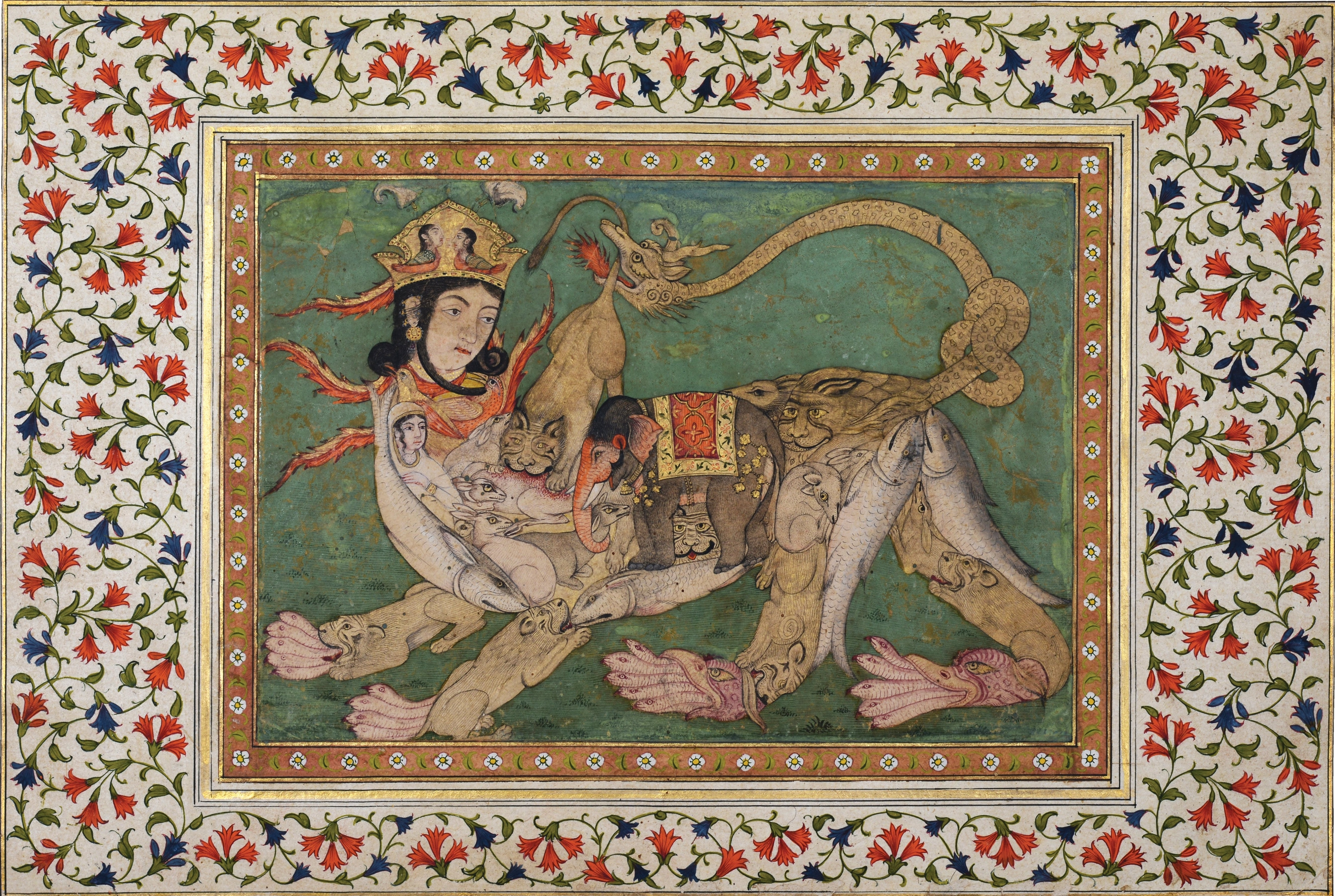
Al Buraq (1770–75), a Deccan painting incorporating Persian elements.

The Buraq (Arabic: الْبُرَاق /ælˈbʊrɑːk/, "lightning") is a supernatural equine-like creature in Islamic tradition that served as the mount of the Islamic prophet Muhammad during his Isra and Mi'raj journey from Mecca to Jerusalem and up through the heavens and back by night, although there is no mention of a mythical creature in the Quran itself. Although never stated to have wings, it is almost always depicted as a pegasus-like being. The Buraq is also said to have transported certain prophets such as Abraham over long distances within a moment's duration.

== Etymology ==
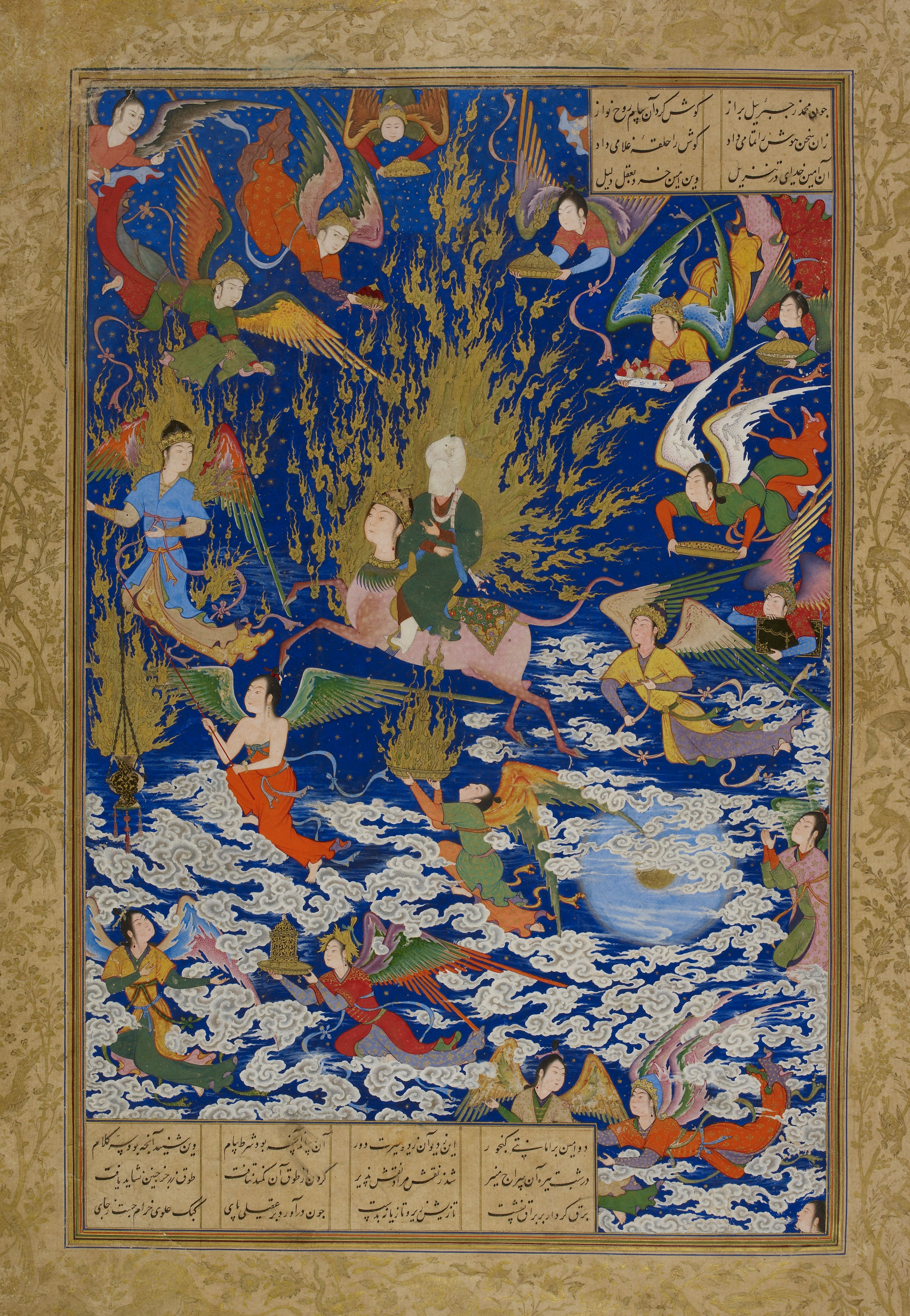
1539-43 illustration of the Mi'raj from the Khamsa, likely created by the court painter Sultan Muhammad, showing Chinese-influenced clouds and angels. This version was created for the Persian Shah Tahmasp I.

The Encyclopaedia of Islam, referring to the writings of Al-Damiri (d.1405), considers al-burāq to be a derivative and adjective of Arabic: برق barq "lightning/emitted lightning" or various general meanings stemming from the verb: "to beam, flash, gleam, glimmer, glisten, glitter, radiate, shimmer, shine, sparkle, twinkle". The name is thought to refer to the creature's lightning-like speed. According to Encyclopædia Iranica, "Boraq" is the Arabized form of "Middle Persian *barāg or *bārag, 'a riding beast, mount' (New Pers. bāra)". According to Emran El-Badawi, the word can be etymologically associated both with a "riding animal" and the "morning star".

== Journey to the Seventh Heaven ==
According to Islamic tradition, the Night Journey took place in 621 CE - ten years after Muhammad announced his prophethood. Muhammad had been in Mecca at the home of his cousin, Fakhitah bint Abi Talib, when he went to the Masjid al-Haram. While he was resting at the Kaaba, the Archangel Jibrīl (Gabriel) appeared to him bringing the Buraq, which carried Muhammad, in the archangel's company, to al-masjid al-aqṣá ("the furthest mosque")^{[Quran 17:1]} - traditionally held to be at the Temple Mount in Jerusalem and identified with the al-Aqsa Mosque. (Note: According to historian Oleg Grabar, "It is only at a relatively late date that the Muslim holy space in Jerusalem came to be referred to as al-haram al-sharif (literally, the Noble Sacred Precinct or Restricted Enclosure, often translated as the Noble Sanctuary and usually simply referred to as the Haram). While the exact early history of this term is unclear, we know that it only became common in Ottoman times, when administrative order was established over all matters pertaining to the organization of the Muslim faith and the supervision of the holy places, for which the Ottomans took financial and architectural responsibility. Before the Ottomans, the space was usually called al-masjid al-aqsa (the Farthest Mosque), a term now reserved to the covered congregational space on the Haram, or masjid bayt al-maqdis (Mosque of the Holy City) or, even, like Mecca's sanctuary, al-masjid al-ḥarâm.")

After reaching Jerusalem, Muhammad descended from the Buraq and prayed on the site of the Temple. He mounted the Buraq again as the creature ascended to the seven heavens, where he successively met Adam, Jesus and his cousin John, Enoch, Aaron, Moses, and Abraham one by one until he reached the throne of God. God communicated with him, giving him words and instructions, and most importantly the commandment to Muslims to offer prayers, initially fifty times a day.

== Abraham ==
According to Ibn Ishaq, the Buraq transported Abraham when he visited Hagar and Ishmael. Tradition states that Abraham lived with Sarah in Canaan but the Buraq would transport him in the morning to Mecca to see his family there and take him back in the evening.

== Hadith ==
Although the Hadith do not explicitly refer to the Buraq as having a human face, Near East and Persian art almost always portrays it so — a portrayal that found its way into Indian Deccan art. This may have originated from an interpretation of the creature being described with a "beautiful face" as the face being human instead of bestial.

An excerpt from a translation of Sahih al-Bukhari describes Buraq:

Then a white animal which was smaller than a mule and bigger than a donkey was brought to me ... The animal's step (was so wide that it) reached the farthest point within the reach of the animal's sight.

— Muhammad al-Bukhari, Sahih al-Bukhari

Another excerpt describes the Buraq in greater detail:

Then he [Gabriel] brought the Buraq, handsome-faced and bridled, a tall, white beast, bigger than the donkey but smaller than the mule. He could place his hooves at the farthest boundary of his gaze. He had long ears. Whenever he faced a mountain his hind legs would extend, and whenever he went downhill his front legs would extend. He had two wings on his thighs which lent strength to his legs. He bucked when Muhammad came to mount him. The angel Gabriel put his hand on his mane and said: "Are you not ashamed, O Buraq? By Allah, no-one has ridden you in all creation more dear to Allah than he is." Hearing this he was so ashamed that he sweated until he became soaked, and he stood still so that the Prophet mounted him.

— Muhammad 'Alawi al-Maliki, The Prophet's Night Journey and Heavenly Ascent

In the earlier descriptions there is no agreement as to the sex of the Buraq. It is typically male, yet Ibn Sa'd has Gabriel address the creature as a female, and it was often rendered by painters and sculptors with a woman's head. The idea that "al-Buraq" is simply a divine mare is also noted in the book The Dome of the Rock, in the chapter "The Open Court", and in the title-page vignette of Georg Ebers's Palestine in Picture and Word.

=== Western Wall ===
Various Janos and writers, such as ibn al-Faqih, ibn Abd Rabbih, and Abd al-Ghani al-Nabulsi, have suggested places where Buraq was supposedly tethered in stories, mostly locations near the southwest corner of the Haram. However, for several centuries the preferred location has been the al-Buraq Mosque, just inside the wall at the south end of the Western Wall Plaza. The mosque sits above an ancient passageway that once came out through the long-sealed Hittah Gate, whose huge lintel remains visible below the Maghrebi gate. Because of the proximity to the Western Wall, the area next to the wall has been associated with Buraq at least since the 19th century.

When a British Jew asked the Egyptian authorities in 1840 for permission to re-pave the ground in front of the Western Wall, the governor of Syria wrote:

It is evident from the copy of the record of the deliberations of the Consultative Council in Jerusalem that the place the Jews asked for permission to pave adjoins the wall of the Haram al-Sharif and also the spot where the Buraq was tethered, and is included in the endowment charter of Abu Madyan, may God bless his memory; that the Jews never carried out any repairs in that place in the past. ... Therefore the Jews must not be enabled to pave the place.

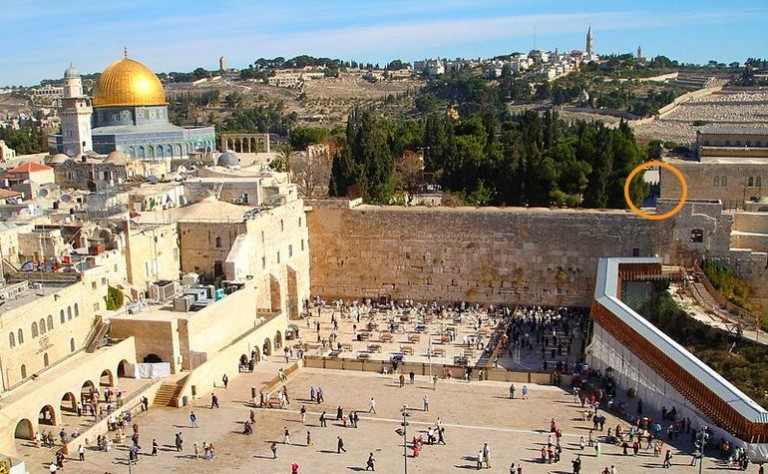
The Buraq Wall (circled in orange) facing the Al-Buraq Mosque

Carl Sandreczki, charged with compiling a list of place names for Charles William Wilson's Ordnance Survey of Jerusalem in 1865, reported that the street leading to the Western Wall, including the part alongside the wall, belonged to the Hosh (court/enclosure) of al Burâk, "not Obrâk, nor Obrat". In 1866, the Prussian Consul and Orientalist Georg Rosen wrote: "The Arabs call Obrâk the entire length of the wall at the wailing place of the Jews, southwards down to the house of Abu Su'ud and northwards up to the substructure of the Mechkemeh [Shariah court]. Obrâk is not, as was formerly claimed, a corruption of the word Ibri (Hebrews), but simply the neo-Arabic pronunciation of Bōrâk, ... which, whilst (Muhammad) was at prayer at the holy rock, is said to have been tethered by him inside the wall location mentioned above."

The name Hosh al Buraq appeared on the maps of Wilson's 1865 survey, its revised editions in 1876 and 1900, and other maps in the early 20th century. In 1922, the official Pro-Jerusalem Council specified it as a street name.

The association of the Western Wall area with Buraq has played an important role in disputes over the holy places since the British mandate.

For Muslims, the Wailing Wall (or Western Wall) is known as "Ḥā’iṭu ’l-Burāq" (Arabic: حَائِطُ ٱلْبُرَاق) - "the Buraq Wall", for on the other side (the Muslim side of the Wailing Wall on the Temple Mount) is where it is believed Muhammad tied the Buraq, the riding animal upon which he rode during the Night of Ascension (Arabic: مِعْرَاج Mi‘rāj). The wall links to the structure of the Al-Buraq Mosque.

== Cultural impact ==
- In Turkey, Pakistan and other Muslim-majority countries, Burak is a common male name.
- Al Boraq (Arabic: البُراق) is a 323-kilometre-long (201 mi) high-speed rail service between Casablanca and Tangier operated by ONCF in Morocco. The rail is the first of its kind on the African continent, and the fastest.
- Two airlines have been named after Buraq: Buraq Air of Libya and the defunct Bouraq Indonesia Airlines of Indonesia, which ceased operations in 2006.
- El-Borak is a pirate in Rafael Sabatini's novel The Sea Hawk; El Borak is a character in short stories by Robert E. Howard. Both are named for their speed and reflexes.
- The Iranian Boragh armoured personnel carrier is named after it.
- Pakistan's NESCOM Burraq was named after the Buraq.
- A Bangladeshi Transport company is named Boraq Paribahan (বোরাক পরিবহন).
- A Malaysian petrol company is named Buraq Oil.
- Aceh, Indonesia has adopted the image of a Buraq on the rampant in the proposed Aceh official seal.

== See also ==
- Ancient astronauts
- Centaur
- Cherub
- Denglong (mythology)
- Elijah's chariot of fire
- Faster than light travel
- Haizum, the horse of Gabriel in Islamic tradition
- Intergalactic travel
- Spacecraft
- Spaceplane
- Starship
- Zuljanah, the horse of Husayn ibn Ali at the Battle of Karbala
- Kamadhenu (similar winged cow creature)
- Lamassu (similar winged bull creature)
- Merkabah mysticism
- Pegasus
- Rakhsh
- Tetramorph
- Vahana
