= Gates of the Temple Mount =

Gateways to Al-Aqsa, Jerusalem

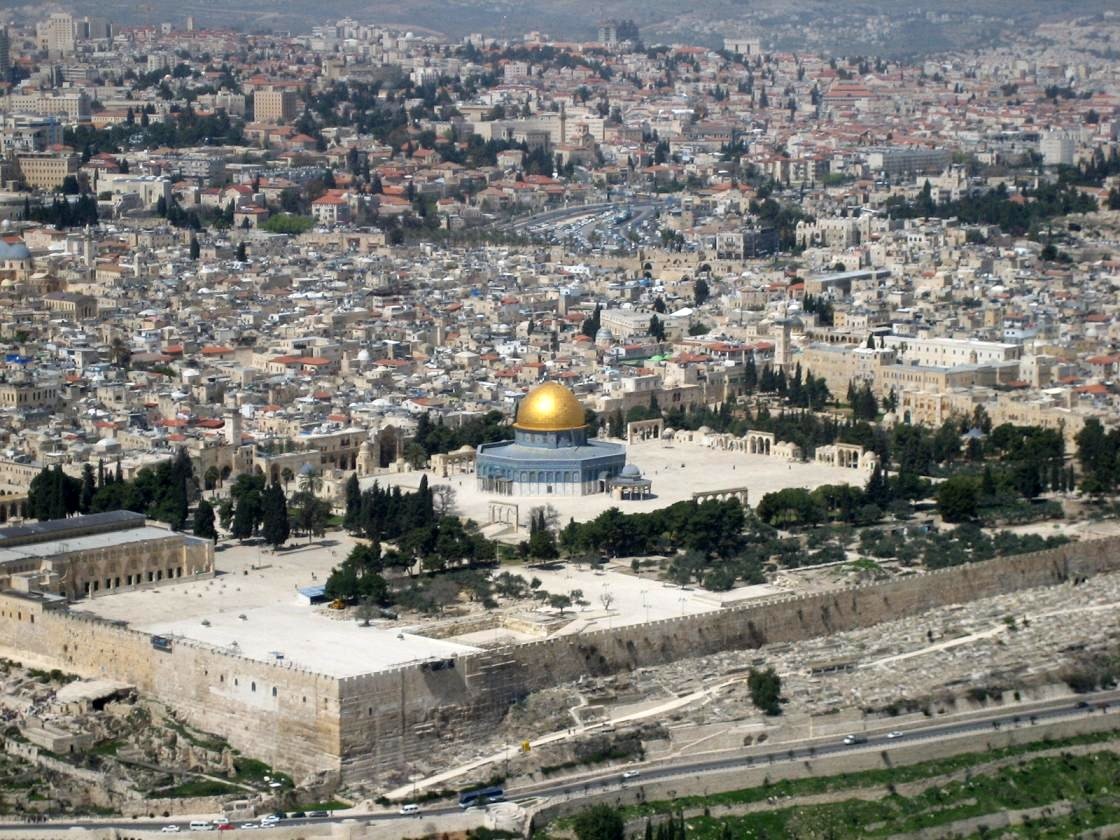
The Temple Mount viewed from southeast

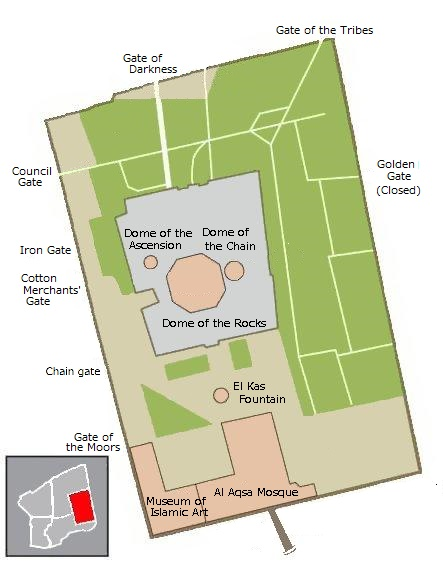
Map of the Temple Mount; some gates are marked on the map

The Temple Mount, a holy site in the Old City of Jerusalem, also known as the al-Ḥaram al-Sharīf or Al-Aqsa, contains twelve gates. One of the gates, Bab as-Sarai, is currently closed to the public but was open under Ottoman rule. There are also six other sealed gates. This does not include the Gates of the Old City of Jerusalem which circumscribe the external walls except on the east side.

== List of openable gates ==
The following is a counter-clockwise list of gates which open onto the Al-Aqsa Compound. Currently eleven gates are open to the Muslim public. Non-Muslims are only permitted to enter through the Magharibah (Maghrebis) gate. The keys to all the gates, with the exception of the Magharibah gate are held by the Islamic Waqf; they can only open or close gates with the permission of Israel.

=== Gate of the Tribes (Bab al-Asbat) ===
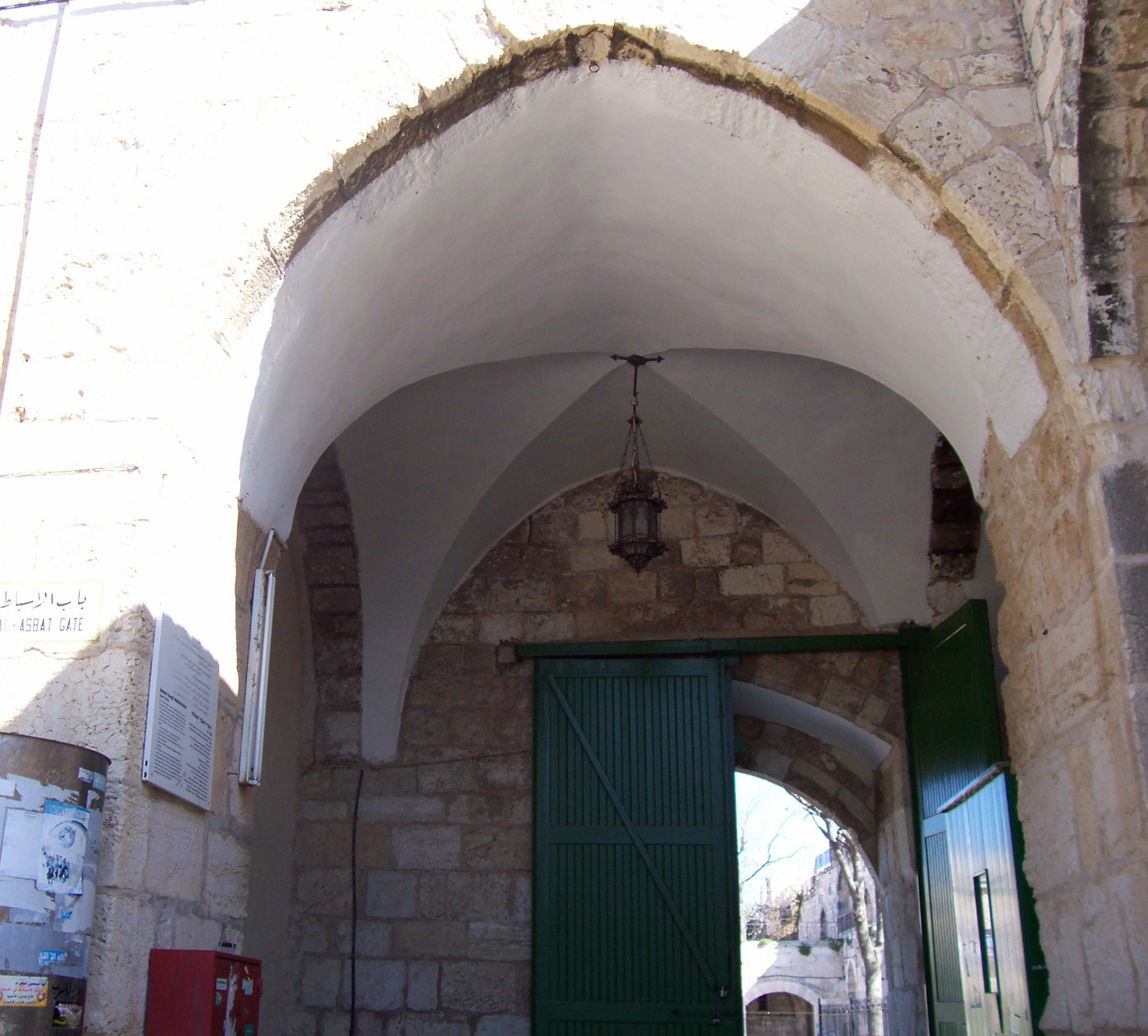
Gate of the Tribes

The Gate of the Tribes (Arabic: باب الأسباط Bāb al-ʾAsbāṭ, Hebrew: שער השבטים) is located at the north-eastern corner of the compound. Its name refers to the Twelve Tribes of Israel ("Bani Isra'il") who left Egypt and came to the Holy Land/Bayt al-Maqdis to find the Promised Land. Bab al-Asbāt is located to the east of the short northern side of the compound. Behind the gate, there is also a road as the Lions' Gate in the old city (also known as St Stephen's Gate).

Asbāt gate is one of the important ancient gates and the gate names had been given by Ibn al-Fakih and Ibn Abd' Rabbih two earliest authorities. The Asbāt gate was first built by the Mamluk ruler Baybars. Later, the door was renewed by Sultan Süleyman I during the Ottoman period. According to a legend, Sultan Suleyman I, who had a bad dream, is claimed to have started to renew the walls of Jerusalem (Beit el-Maqdis) after this dream.

The Asbāt gate is located on the northern wall of the Haram al-Sharif and it is in the double gateway also, it is almost directly opposite Ahwab Mihrab Mariam. The entrance to the gate is impressively decorated. There has the single opening of a semicircular arch with a distinctive 45-degree chamfer and segmental inner arch at the part of the gate that has reached the present time, also the masonry of the wall shows that there are two gates because 1.20 meters of the gate wall reaches to the west side. According to Ratrout, the Early Muslim architecture of Bab al-Asbāt and its dimensions coincide with those of Bab al-Hashmi. Bab al-Asbāt is 2.81 meters in the width of the doorway, 3.30 meters in the width of the inner threshold of the doorway, and 4.30 meters in height of its arch. Due to its level with the ground, this gate is the only gate through which ambulances can enter the mosque in case of emergency.

=== Gate of Remission (Bab al-Hitta) ===
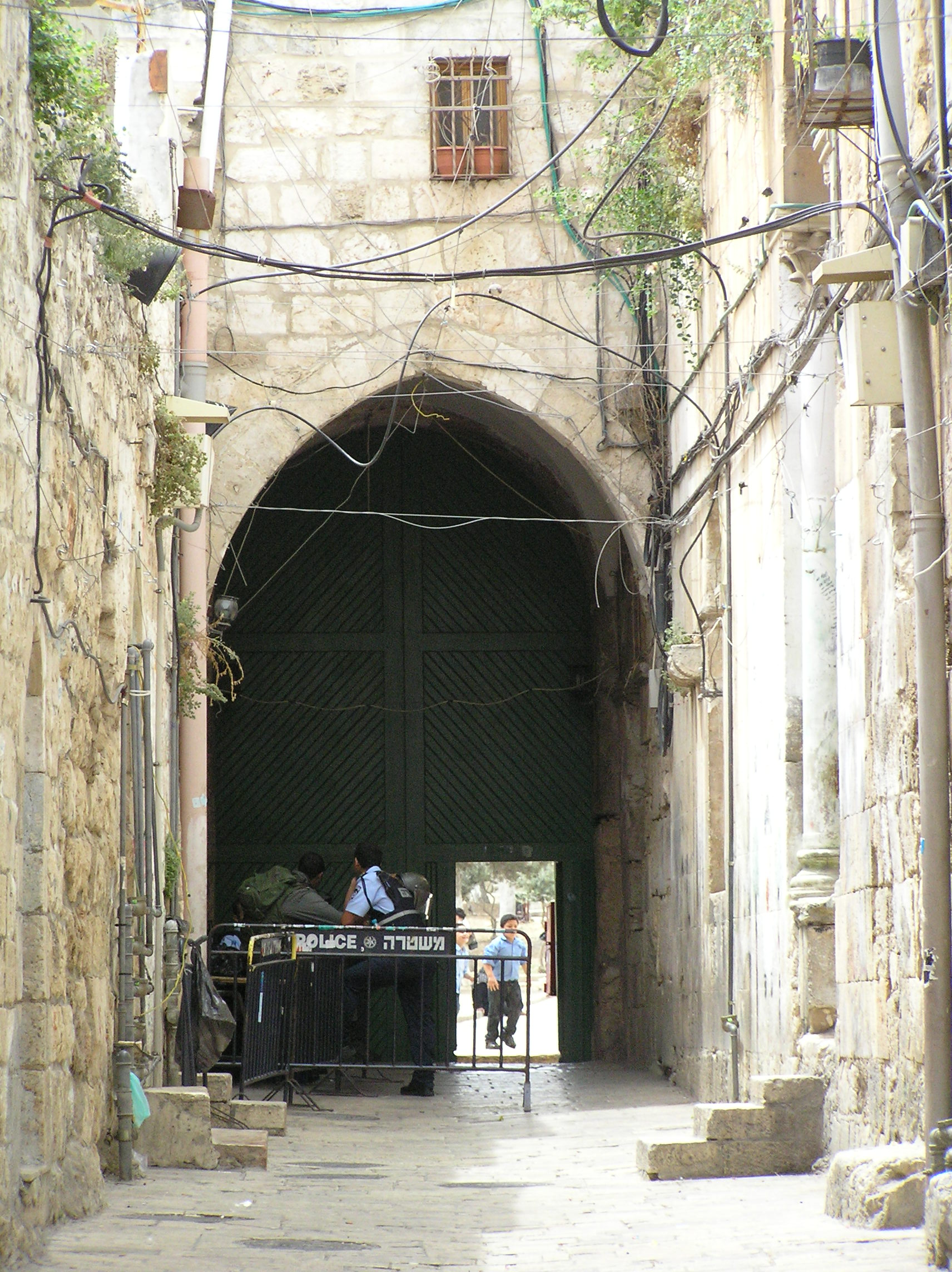
Remission (Forgiveness) Gate

The Gate of Remission (Arabic: باب الحطه Bāb al-Ḥiṭṭa), where 'remission' means 'forgiveness', is located on the north side, about 130 metres (430 ft) westward of the far eastern-end of the Temple Mount. It is one of the oldest gates of the Al-Aqsa compound, and is the main entrance for visitors entering from the northern side of the city of Jerusalem (al-Quds), including the neighborhood of Bab Huta.The gate is said to have taken its Arabic name from a verse in the Quran (Surah 2, 55–56), which has a reference to 'remission of sins'.

=== Gate of Darkness (Bab al-Atim) ===
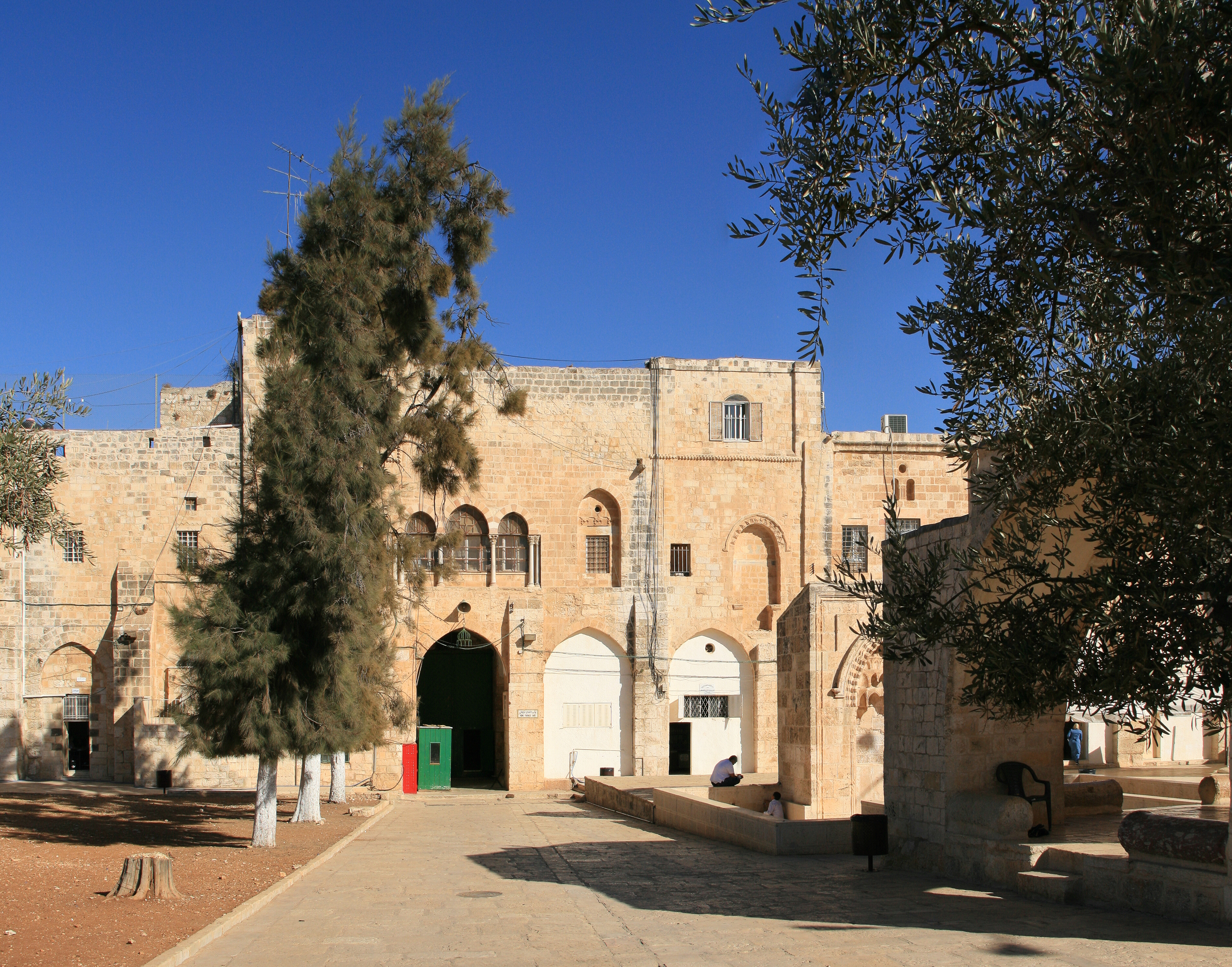
King Faisal's Gate (Gate of Darkness)

The Gate of Darkness (Arabic: باب العتم Bāb al-ʿAtim or -ʿAtam) is one of the three gates located on the north side. It was called "Gate of al-Dawadariya" (باب الدوادرية), after a nearby school. It is now also known as King Faisal's Gate (باب الملك فيصل). The gate is four meters tall, with an arched roof. At least two renovations are known, once circa 1213, during the reign of Ayyubid King al-Mu'azzam Isa, and then circa 1930 by King Faisal of Saudi Arabia. It is one of the three gates on the north. The gate is also known as the "Gate of Honor of the Prophets" (باب شرف الانبیاء).

=== Gate of the Bani Ghānim (Bab al-Ghawanima) ===
The Gate of the Bani Ghānim (Arabic: باب الغوانمه Bāb al-Ghawānima) is located on the north-western corner. The name is the Arabic collective for the clan name Ghanim, a name documented since at least the 16th century. It was called the al-Khalil gate (باب الخلیل).

=== Gate of the Seraglio or Palace (Bab as-Sarai; closed) ===
A twelfth gate still open during Ottoman rule is now closed to the public: Bab as-Sarai (Gate of the Seraglio, or of the Palace); a small gate to the former residence of the Pasha of Jerusalem; in the northern part of the western wall, between the Bani Ghānim and Council Gates.

=== Council Gate (Bab al-Majlis) ===
The Council Gate (باب المجلس Bāb al-Majlis), also known as the Inspector's Gate (Bāb an-Nāẓir or Nadhir), is located on the northern side of the western Temple Mount wall. It was called Bāb al-Mīkāʾīl (باب المیکائیل) and Bāb al-Ḥabs (باب الحبس). The gate is thought to have existed as early as the Crusader period. The gate was refurbished during the reign of the Ayyubid Sultan, al-Mu'azzam 'Issa, in 1203 CE. An inn for wayfarers was built on the road leading from the gate in the years 1260–1277, and was later converted into a prison compound, hence the name Bāb al-Ḥabs (= "Prison Gate"). The name 'Council Gate' (Bāb al-Majlis) is derived from the fact that on the north side of the gate stood the office of the Supreme Muslim Council during the British Mandate over Palestine.

=== Iron Gate (Bab al-Hadid) ===
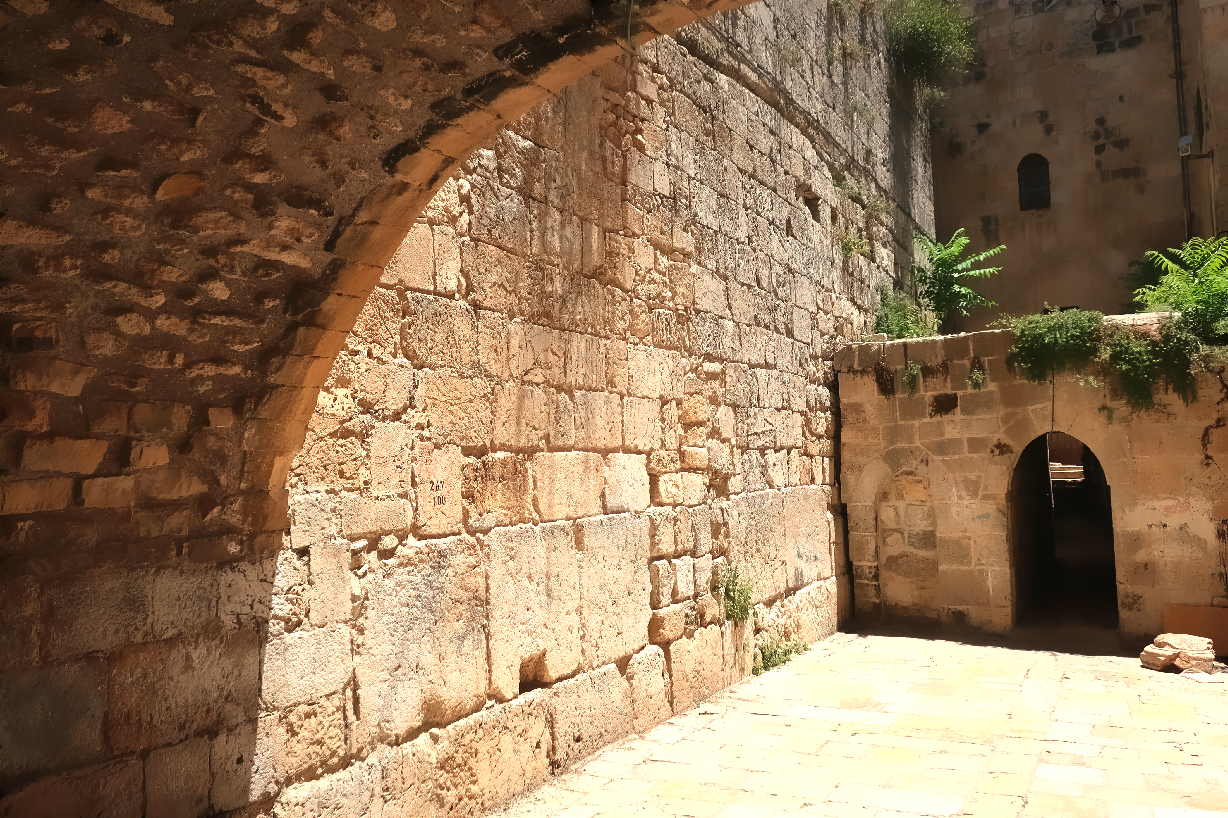
Little Western Wall near the Iron Gate

The Iron Gate (باب الحديد Bāb al-Ḥadīd, Hebrew: Shaar Barzel) is located on the western side, at the end of Bab al-Hadid Street, being within the Muslim Quarter, and where, before entering, one gains access to an exposed and contiguous section of the ancient wall of the Temple Mount, known locally as the Little Western Wall.

=== Cotton Merchants' Gate (Bab al-Qattanin) ===
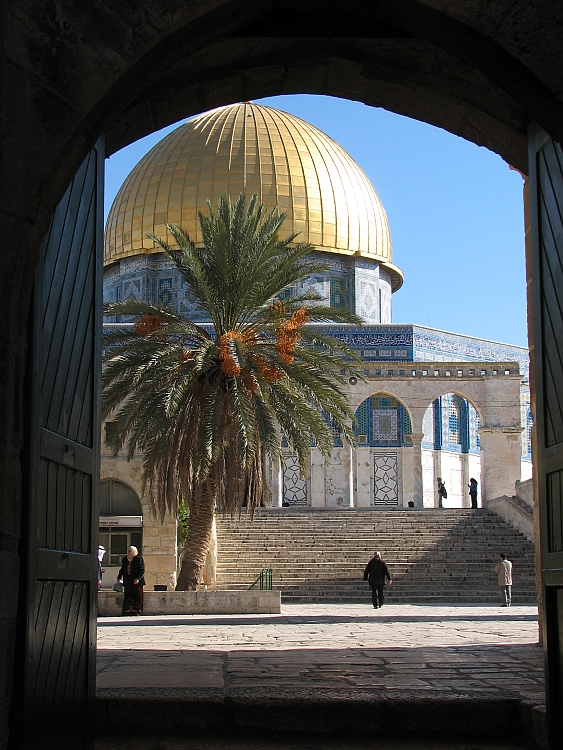
Dome of the Rock viewed through Cotton Merchants' Gate

The Cotton Merchants' Gate (Arabic: باب القطانين Bāb al-Qaṭṭānīn Hebrew: שער מוכרי הכותנה) leads onto the Temple Mount. Merchant shops align both sides of the passage-way leading to the Cotton Merchants' gate, a mercantile zone known as the Bazaar of the Haram. The gate was built by the ruler of Damascus, Tankiz, during the reign of Mamluk Sultan ibn Qalawun, as marked by an inscription over the door. Since this site is the closest a person can get to the Foundation Stone (the natural rock and cavern at the center of the Dome of the Rock and thought by some scholars to be the even ha-shetayah) without setting foot on the mount itself, the gate was a popular place of prayer for Jews during the 19th century.

=== Ablution Gate (Bab al-Mathara) ===
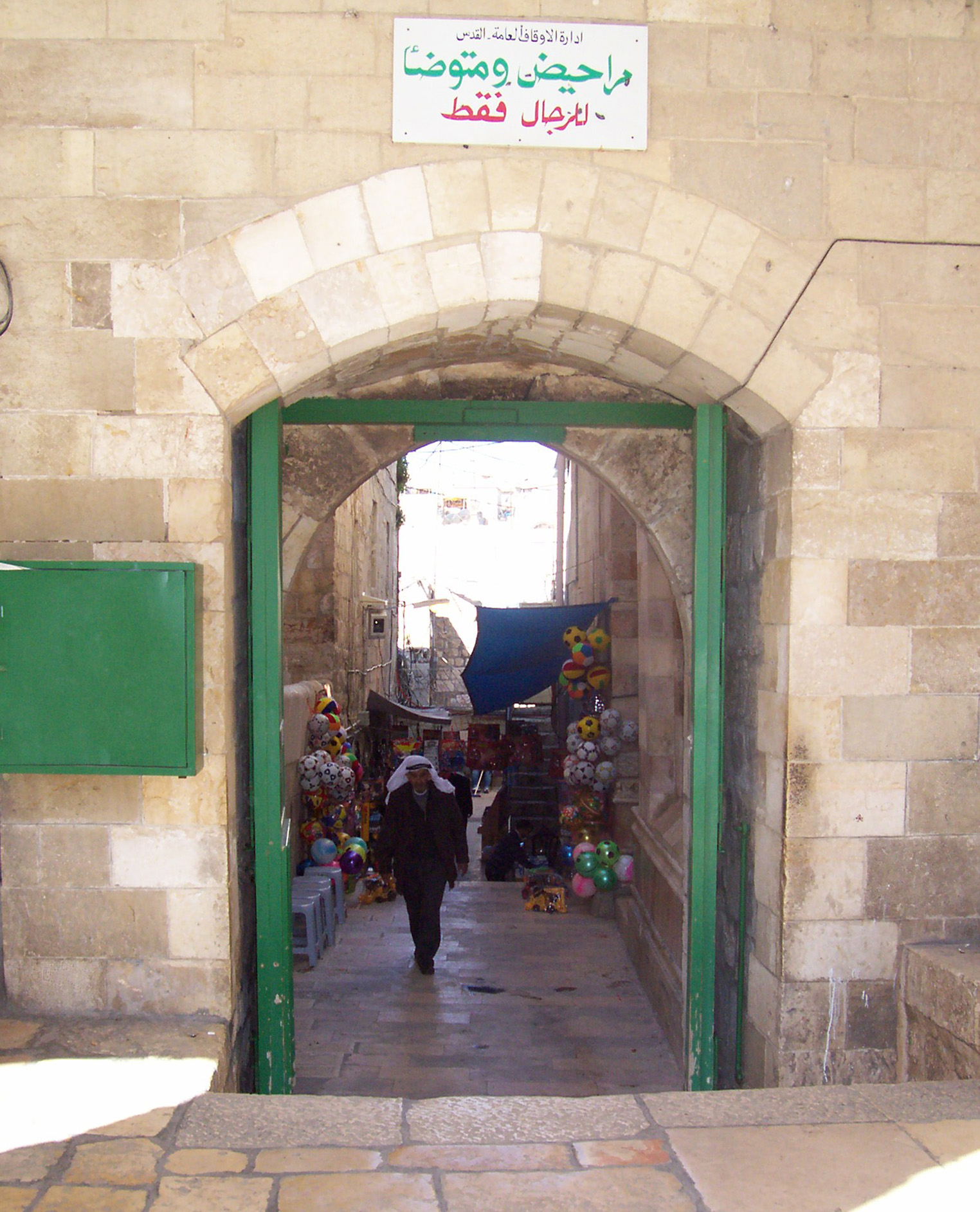
Through the Ablution Gate towards the Old City

The small Ablution Gate (Arabic: باب المطهرة Bāb al-Maṭhara or باب المتوضأ Bāb al-Mutawaḍḍaʾ, or Bāb aṭ-Ṭahāra (باب الطهارة) is located on the western flank.

The gate is rectangular in shape and reaches a height of 3.5 m. It was renovated during the reign of the Mamluk emir Alaa al-Din al-Busairi in the year 666 AH (1266 CE). It is the only gate that does not lead to the streets and alleys of the Old City, but to a private road that leads to the Ablutions Place al-mathara located 50 meters away from it.

The Waqf (Islamic Endowments) Department in Jerusalem, which is in charge of managing the affairs of the Al-Aqsa Mosque, rebuilt it in the 1980s.

The name of the Ablution Gate is a euphemistic indication that it leads toward public latrines. These might well be the oldest still in use worldwide, dating back to 1193, when Saladin's brother Adil had them built.

=== Tranquility Gate (Bab as-Salam) ===
The Tranquility Gate (Bāb as-Salām), or what is also known as the Gate of the Divine Presence (Bāb as-Sakīna), is the closed, twin gate of the Chain Gate. It is situated on the north side of the 'Chain Gate'.

=== Chain Gate (Bab as-Silsila) ===
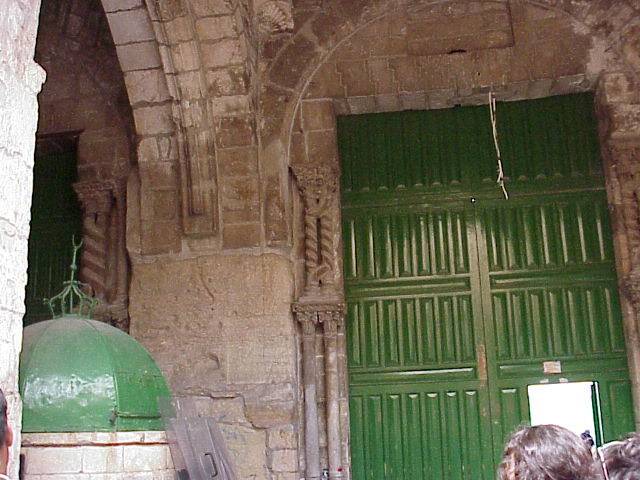
Gate of the Chain

The Chain Gate (Arabic: باب السلسلة, Bāb as-Silsila; Hebrew: Shaar HaShalshelet) is located on the western flank. Though not without dispute, some think that this was the site of the Kipunos (Coponius) Gate, which existed during the Second Temple period. The Chain Gate (Bāb as-Silsila) lies immediately over the Pool al-Burak.

=== Magharibah Gate ===
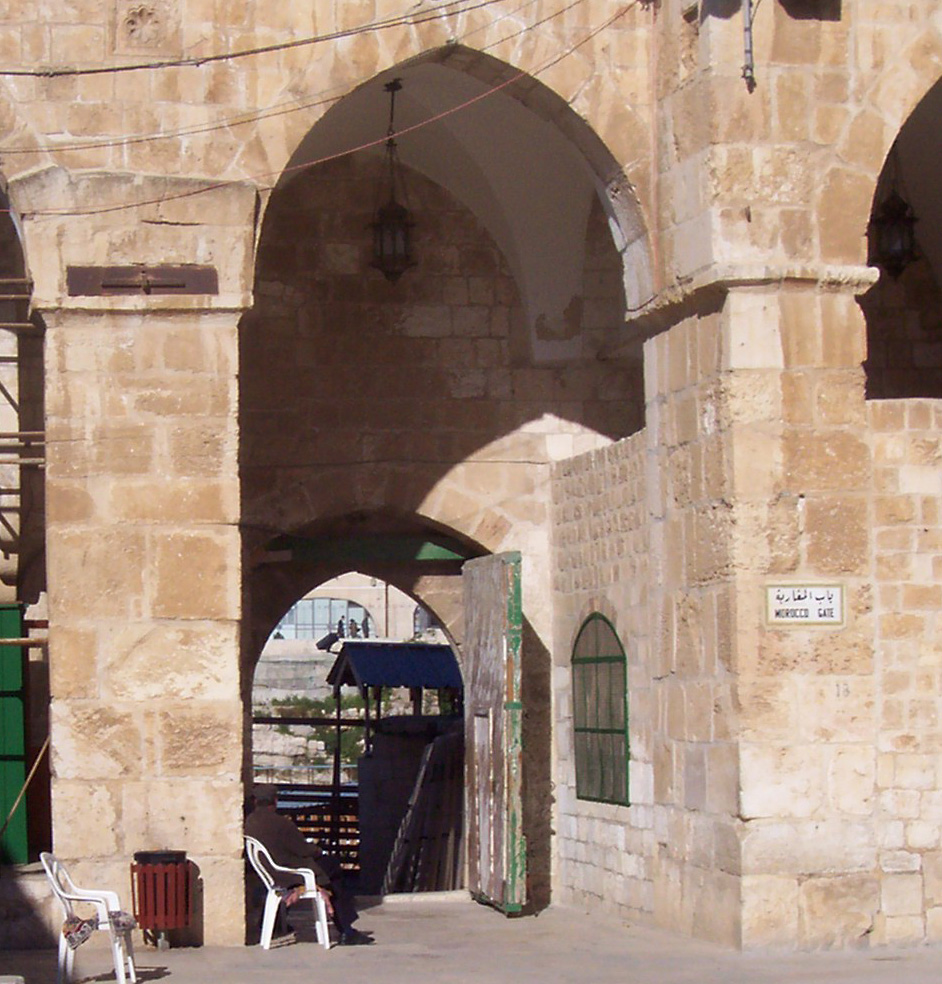
The Magharibah Gate from within the Mount

The Moors' Gate, also known as Magharibah Gate (Arabic: باب المغاربة Bāb al-Maghāriba; Hebrew: Shaar HaMughrabim), is the southernmost gate on the western flank of the compound, built directly over the Herodian-period gate known as the Gate of the Prophet (also known as Barclay's Gate, named for James Turner Barclay). It is believed that the current gate was built during the Ayyubid period and renovated and connected to the western section of the compound during Mamluke rule. The gate was constructed around the time that the Ayyubids endowed the quarter to North Africans and Moors of Andalusia, Malikites, who were living side by side in Jerusalem. The Magharibah, as these communities were called in Arabic, lived in this area until they were dispersed with the quarter's demolition in 1967 by Israel in order to construct the Western Wall Plaza for the Jews to pray. Some 130 homes were destroyed, displacing the North African inhabitants who came and settled in the area since the time of Saladin.

Over the years, the ground level outside the Magharibah Gate rose by many meters above its threshold and the Gate of the Prophet (Barclay's Gate) was finally walled up in the 10th century. At some stage, a new gate called Bab al-Magharibah was installed in al-Buraq Wall (Western Wall) above the Gate of the Prophet (Barclay's Gate), at the level of the compound esplanade. It was named after the residents of the adjacent neighborhood, who had come to Jerusalem from the Maghreb in the days of Saladin. This gate is open to this day and since 1967 has been the entrance to the grounds of the Al-Aqsa Mosque, accessible to non-Muslims only. Muslims have been banned from using this gate since 1967.

Although the keys to the Al-Aqsa compound gates are in the hands of Islamic Waqf organization, access to the al-Magharibah gate has been dictated by Israel since 1967.

The gate, specifically the excavation of the historic ramp leading up to it, has been a point of contention between Israelis and Arab Muslims. In February 2004, a wall which supported the 800-year-old ramp jutting out from al-Buraq Wall (Western Wall) and leading up to the Maghariba Gate, partially collapsed. Israeli authorities believed a recent earthquake and snowfall may have been responsible, while Hamas and Muslim officials blamed the collapse on Israelis working in the area. The Maghariba Gate is the only access for non-Muslims to enter the site, meaning its closure will prevent both Jews and tourists from visiting until a replacement structure is built. The ramp leads from the plaza by the Western Wall up to the adjoining compound, known to Muslims as Haram al-Sharif, which houses the Al-Aqsa Mosque. It is known that Israel has been carrying out archaeological excavations in an area outside the compound, inviting the charge that they are trying to destabilise the mosque, Islam's third holiest site. In 2007, the Israel Antiquities Authority (IAA) built a temporary wooden pedestrian bridge to the Maghariba Gate. No agreement could be reached over a more permanent structure.

The damaged ramp, situated beneath the bridge and not connected to it, consists of an accumulation of archaeological layers which have been excavated by the IAA, who removed surface material and made visible several ruined structures. This was done in contravention to the action plan initially submitted by the IAA to the UNESCO.

In 2013, an archaeological excavation was conducted at the Maghariba Gate by Hayim-Her Barbe, Roie Greenvald, and Yevgeni Kagan, on behalf of the Israel Antiquities Authority (IAA).

Firas Dibs, Press Spokesperson for the Jerusalem Islamic Foundations Administration, stated that the Israeli police attacked the al-Haram as-Sharif community. Dibs pointed out that there was a dispute and friction between Palestinian youth and Israeli police in front of the Al-Maqariba (Maghrebis) Gate in the south west of Al-Aqsa Mosque, and write that the police intervened with sound bombs and rubber bullets.

On 24 May 2021, the Temple Mount complex was reopened to Jews for the first time in 20 days after Muslim unrest.

== Sealed gates ==
The wall surrounding the Temple Mount contains six sealed gates.

=== Golden Gate ===
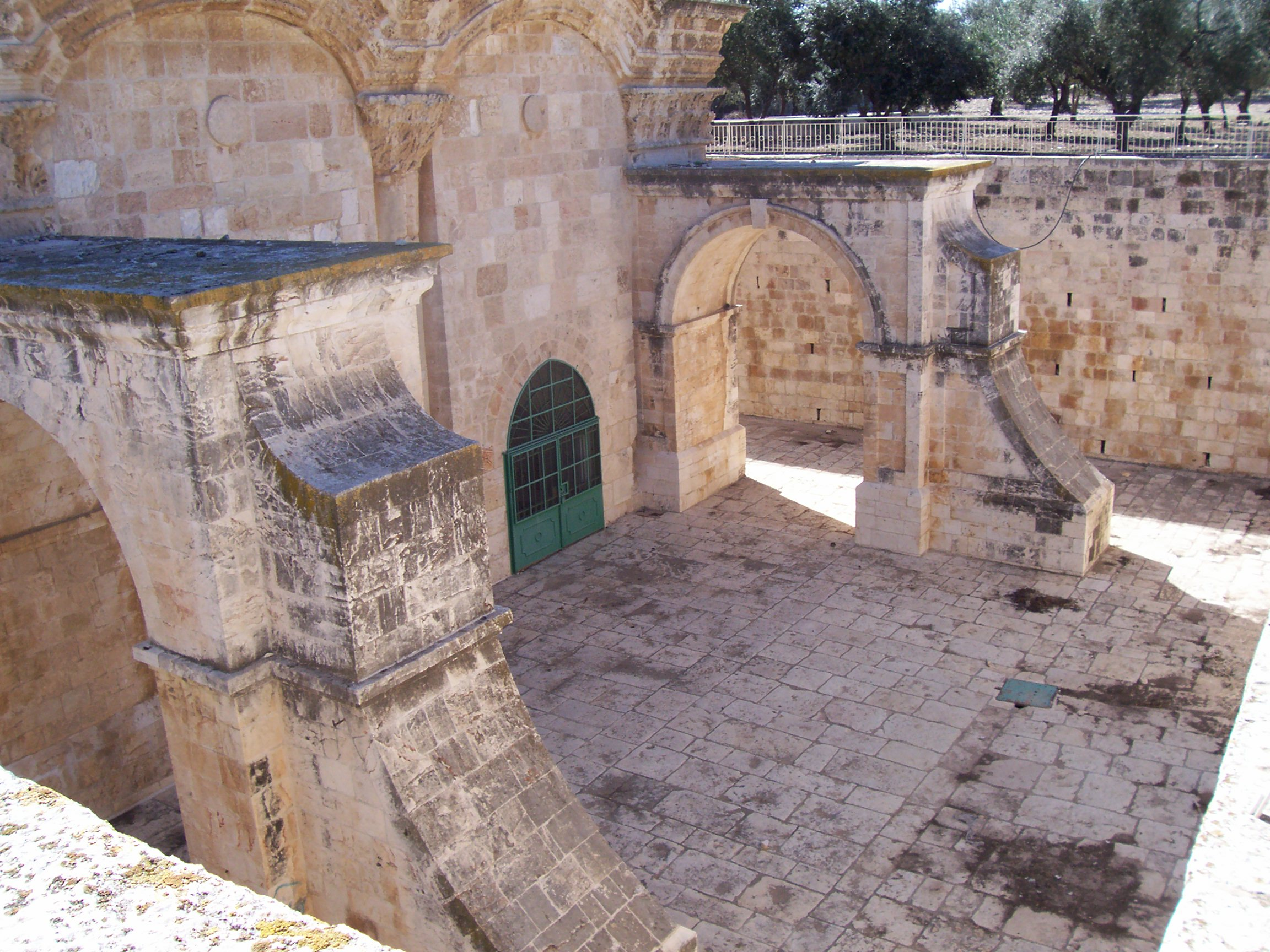
The Golden Gate from within the Mount

The Golden Gate (Arabic: باب الرحمة, romanized: Bāb al-Raḥma, lit. 'Mercy Gate'; Hebrew: Sha'ar Harachamim, "Gate of Mercy"), located on the eastern wall of the Temple Mount, was probably built in the 520s CE, as part of Justinian I's building program in Jerusalem, on top of the ruins of an earlier gate in the wall. An alternate theory holds that it was built in the later part of the 7th century by Byzantine artisans employed by the Umayyad khalifs. It has two vaulted halls which lead to the Door of Mercy, Bab al-Rahma, and the Door of Repentance, Bab al-Taubah. Closed by the Muslims in 810, reopened in 1102 by the Crusaders, it was walled up by Saladin after regaining Jerusalem in 1187. Suleiman the Magnificent rebuilt it together with the city walls, but walled it up in 1541, and it has stayed that way until today. The 1st-century historian, Josephus, who mentions the "eastern gate" in his Antiquities, makes note of the fact that this gate was considered within the far northeastern extremity of the inner sacred court. According to the Mishnah, there was formerly a causeway which led out of the Temple Mount eastward over the Kidron Valley, extending as far as the Mount of Olives. Rabbi Eliezer, dissenting, says that it was not a causeway, but rather marble pillars over which cedar boards had been laid, used by the High Priest and his entourage. This gate was not used by the masses to enter the Temple Mount, but reserved only for the High Priest and all those that aided him when taking out the Red Heifer or the scapegoat on the Day of Atonement.

Dutch archaeologist Leen Ritmeyer, who explored the gate in the 1970s, reached the conclusion that the two monolithic massive gateposts seen on the inside of the gate belong to an old structure of the gate, thought to be the Shushan Gate (mentioned in Mishnah Middot 1:3 as being the only gate in the Eastern Wall), and that it dates from the First Temple period.

During the Ottoman-Turk era, the inner recess (vestibule) built within the western side of the Golden Gate was used for brick burning, which bricks were then used to renovate buildings and structures in the Haram esh-Sharif (Temple Mount enclosure). A small mosque was built near the Golden Gate to cater to the brick burners, but which was later destroyed, along with part of the gate's wall, by order of the sultan in the 19th century in order to make room for renovations. A new wall and two new arches were added to the Gate's western interior. The gate house, which is accessed from the Temple Mount by descending a wide flight of stairs leading into it, and where the current ground floor is built in the shape of a rectangle measuring 24 metres (79 ft) × 17 metres (56 ft) (exterior wall measurements), is surrounded by walls, the length of which space is divided by a row of columns forming two equal divisions. At the ground level can be seen the top of an ancient arch (the lower stones still buried underground), the existence of which leads to the conclusion that the original ground level was much lower than what it is today.

=== Warren's Gate ===
Gate in the western wall, north of Barclay's Gate; now accessible only through the Western Wall Tunnels and in use as a synagogue, as it stands closest to the Foundation Stone, associated with the Holy of Holies and covered since the 7th century by the Dome of the Rock.

=== Hittah Gate/Barclay's Gate ===
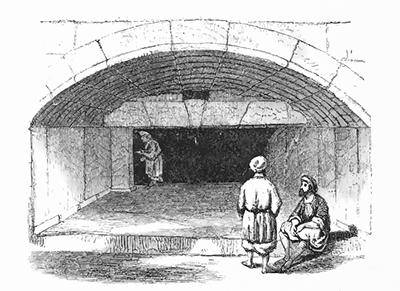
Al-Buraq Mosque drawn by Barclay, c. 1851–1854

Barclay's Gate lies within the Al-Buraq Mosque, under the Magharibah Gate (Moors' Gate) and is one of the four al-Masjid al-Aqsa compound's original gates on its western side. Its Arabic name is Bāb an-Nabi, "Gate of the Prophet [Muhammad]"—not to be confused with the Triple Gate, which has the same Arabic name. It is named after James Turner Barclay, a 19th-century Christian missionary who discovered the main structure of the gate buried underground within the Al-Aqsa compound in 1852. Several researchers identified it as one of the Second Temple period gates, possibly the Coponius Gate, which is mentioned in Jewish and Christian sources of the period. The gate was blocked with stones at the end of the 10th century and the internal gate room was transformed into a mosque dedicated to Buraq. Today the room is closed and entrance to it is prohibited without the approval of the Waqf.

After the Six-Day War, the Israel Religious Affairs Ministry and Benjamin Mazar, who was at the time conducting the dig outside the southern wall of the Temple Mount, planned to uncover this gate, but they were prevented from doing so by both Jewish and Muslim religious leaders.

=== Huldah Gates ===
The Huldah Gates comprise two sets of bricked-up gates in the southern wall of the Temple Mount. The fact that the original entrance gateways still exist reflects an ancient promise cited in a work of rabbinic literature, Shir ha-Shirim Rabbah: "The Kohen Gate and the Huldah Gate were never destroyed and God will renew them". The 1st-century historian, Josephus, mentions these gates in his Antiquities: "...the fourth front of the temple [mount], which was southward, had indeed itself gates in its middle."

==== Double Gate ====
The Double Gate/ The Prophets Gate/ Bab Al Nabi The Prophets Gate or the Double Gate is one of the permanently closed gates along the Southern wall of Al Aqsa Compound. The Gate was used by the Umayyad Caliphs when they would visit Al Aqsa Mosque from their palaces to the south of the compound.

This gate is located around 100 metres from the South Western corner of the Compound. According to Khusru, Bab al Nabi was named as such because it was believed to be the place that the Prophet Muhammed entered Al Aqsa on the night of Isra and Miraj. Since the 19th Century according to Ratrout, the name “Double Gate” was given due to the two rectangular doorways which opened up into the long tunnel leading to the “Ancient Mosque” or “Al Aqsa Qadeem”. The Gateway enters into a long tunnel which measures more than 77 metres towards the north from the Southern wall. On the side of the doorways, above the arch there are floral engravings which according to Ben-Dov 1985, p138 is an “arch in the style of the Muslim Period”

According to Ratrout, p. 256, Bab Al Nabi leads to a square domed vestibule which then leads to a flight of stairs leading to a double passage tunnel up to the level of the compound. The tunnel according to Ratrout during the early Islamic Period was much shorter but was extended to the north by the Abbasid Caliphs Al Mansur and Al Mahdi in 154-163 AH/ 771-780 AD [Hamilton, 1949, p63]

==== Triple Gate ====
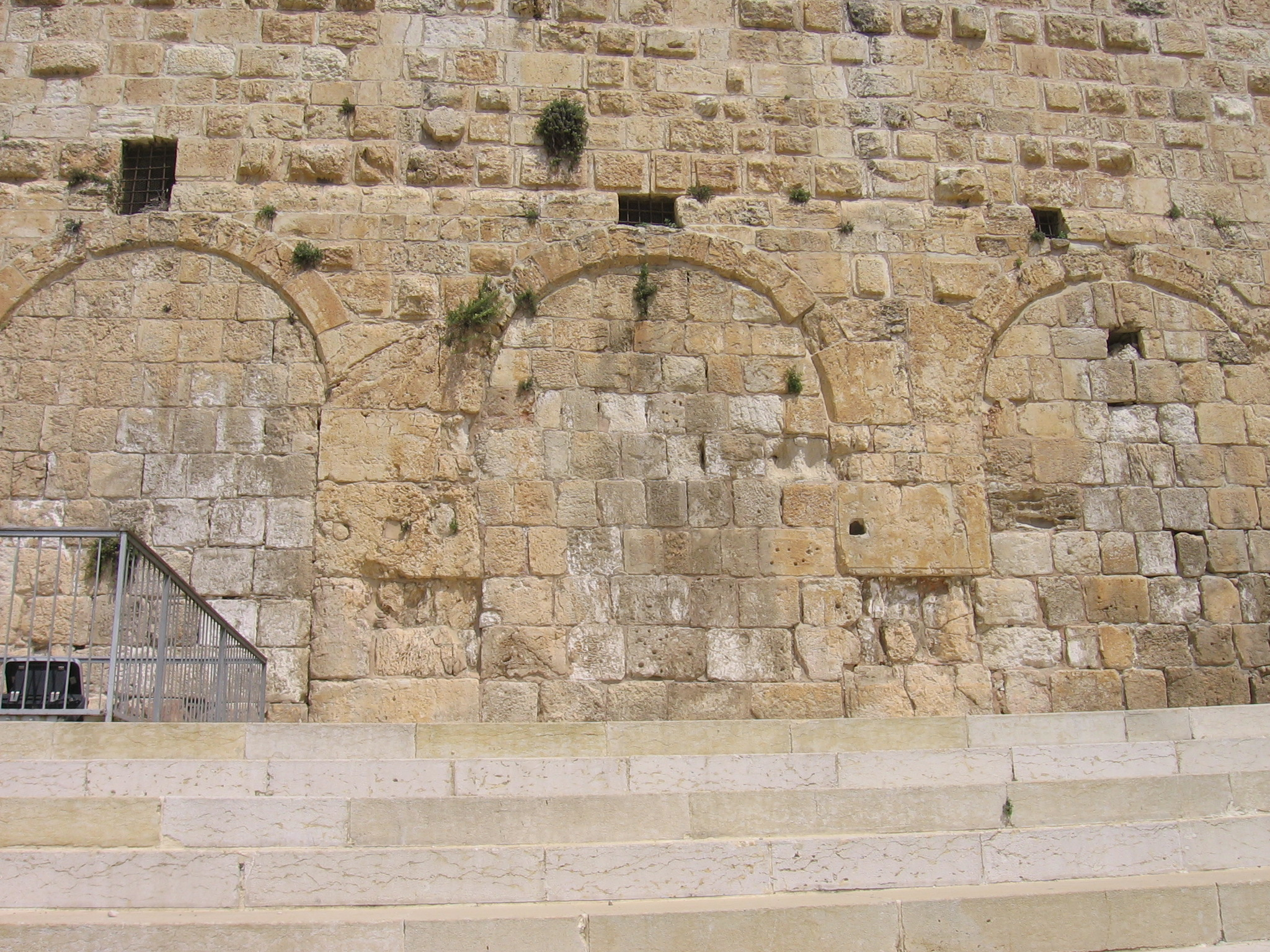
The Triple Gate

The set on the right is a triple-arched gate, known as the Triple Gate - not to be confused with Barclay's Gate, which has the same Arabic name. Each of the gates once led into a passageway stretching underneath the esplanade of the Mount, and then to steps leading up to the esplanade itself.

=== Single Gate ===
The Single Gate is located along the southern wall. It once led to the underground area of the Temple Mount known as Solomon's Stables or Marwani Mosque.

It was built over a Herodian substructure, which served as a drainage tunnel and possibly as an underground escape route. The Umayyads build the first actual gate there, probably so as to provide private access to the vaults from their adjacent palace. The Fatimids stabilised the wall after an 11th-century earthquake. The Crusaders remodelled the gate giving it its surviving pointed arch shape and used it to access the underground stables ("Solomon's Stables") inside the Mount. The gate was blocked and permanently sealed during the following Ayyubid, Mamluk, and Ottoman periods.

=== Gate of the Funerals, or of the Burāq ===
Bāb al-Janā’iz (باب الجنائز, 'Gate of the Funerals'), or Bāb al-Burāq (باب البراق, 'Gate of the Burāq') is a hardly noticeable postern, or maybe an improvised gate, once opening into the eastern wall a short distance south of the Golden Gate.

== See also ==
- Temple Mount entry restrictions
- Southern Wall
- Walls of Jerusalem
