= Little Western Wall =

Jewish religious site in Jerusalem

Coordinates: 31°46′42.63″N 35°14′2.75″E

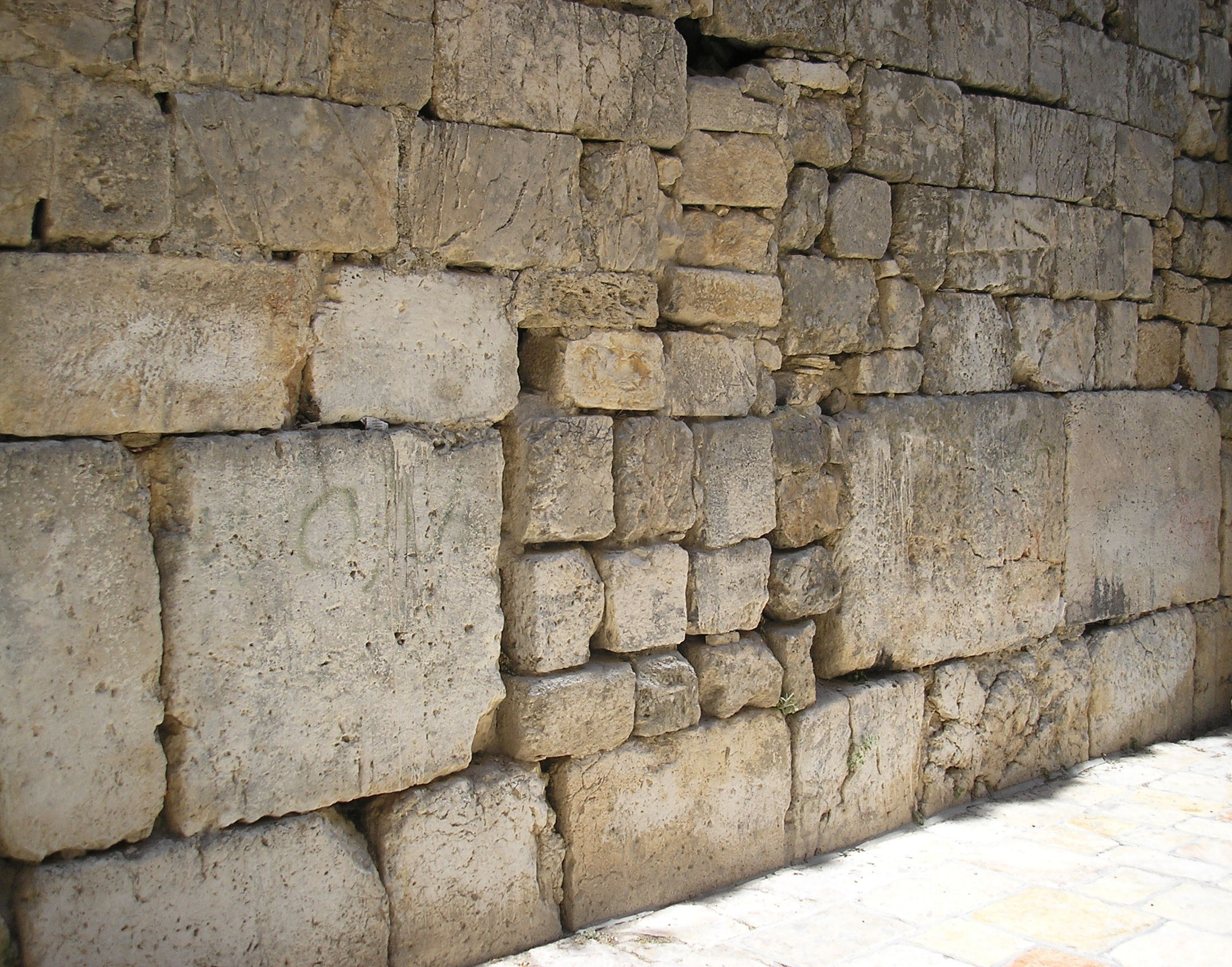

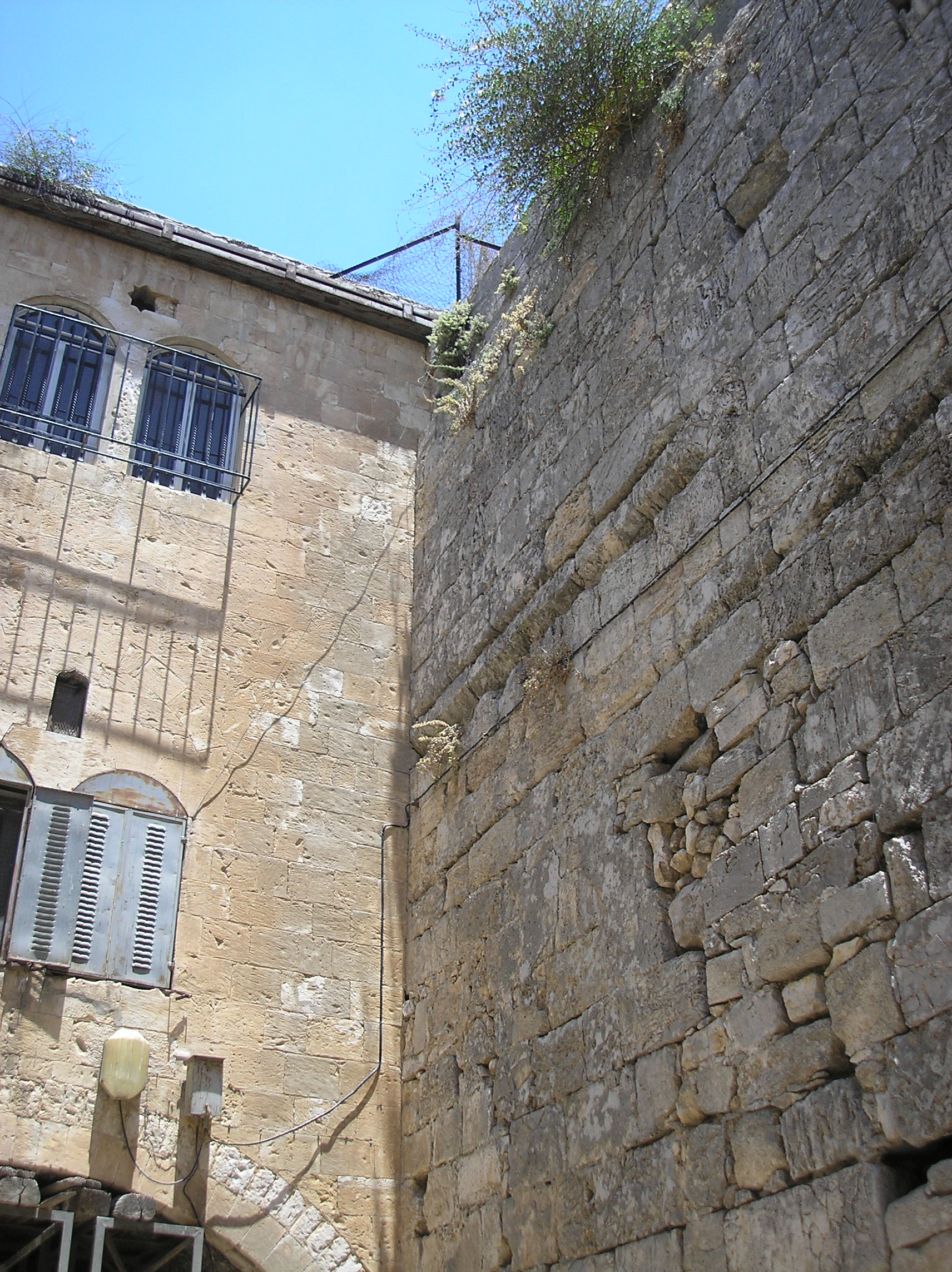

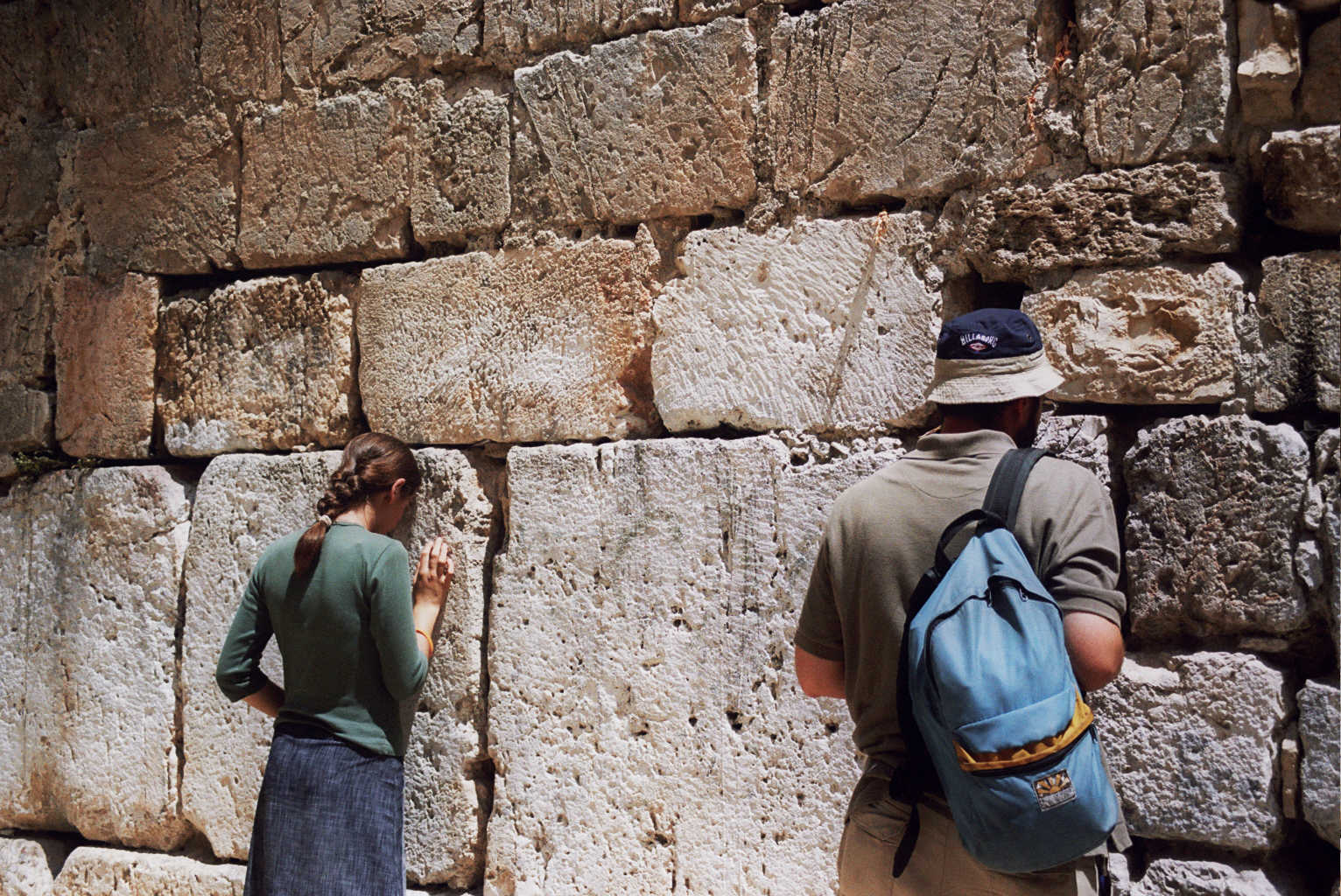
A man and a woman praying at the Little Western Wall

The Little Western Wall, also known as HaKotel HaKatan (Hebrew: הכותל הקטן) or just Kotel Katan, Kleiner Koisel (Yiddish for "Small Kotel/Wall"), the Small, or Little Kotel, is a Jewish religious site located in the Muslim Quarter of the Old City of Jerusalem near the Iron Gate to the Temple Mount. The wall itself dates from the Second Temple period (516 BCE – 70 CE). It is part of the Western Wall, a retaining wall of the Herodian Temple compound which also contains the by far more famous and larger section known in the West as the Wailing Wall, and almost exactly faces the Holy of Holies. HaKotel HaKatan and its famous counterpart are the only sections of the almost 500 m long Western Wall not covered by houses, but the smaller free-standing section is not as crowded as the larger one. This section of the wall is of deep spiritual significance because of its close proximity to the Holy of Holies. However, it is not the closest location to the Holy of Holies, as there is a location in the Western Wall Tunnel which directly faces the Holy of Holies.

== Dimensions ==
Unlike the more famous Western Wall, the Kotel Katan does not have a large plaza facing it. In this way it resembles the situation of the Wailing Wall as it appeared before the Six-Day War of 1967, before the Moroccan Quarter was razed and the Western Wall Plaza added. The Kotel Katan has a narrow alley, and only the two lowest courses (rows of building stones) date from the Second Temple period. Unlike those on the Western Wall, the stones have not been worn smooth by the touch of millions of worshippers.

== History ==
The passage alongside the wall is Hosh ash-Shihābī, the hosh (courtyard) of Ribāṭ Kurd (Ribāṭ Kurt al-Manṣūrī), a ribat (hospice) for Muslim pilgrims founded in 1293 or 1296 by Sayf ad-Dīn Kurd (Kurt) al-Manṣūrī, a mamluk of Sultan Qalāwūn. The entrance portal and passage are original, but other parts of the structure date from later periods.

Because the Kotel Katan is much closer to the site of the possible location of the Holy of Holies than the larger Western Wall, it has significance to Jews, who wish to continue to pray at the site.

== 1971 tunnelling damage ==
In late 1971, extensive tunnelling along the wall by the Israeli Department of Religious Affairs caused the partial collapse of Ribāṭ Kurd. The Department sought to take advantage of the situation by demolishing the 670-year-old structure to create a new plaza, but backed off after an international outcry. Instead, repairs consisting of a concrete buttress and steel supports were undertaken. During the repairs, workmen drilled some small holes in the wall. This caused protests from Haredi Jews, who collected the fragments of stone and ceremoniously buried them at the Western Wall.

== In the news ==
In October 2011, a group called Kotleinu ("our wall") and another group known as Legal Forum for the Land of Israel petitioned the government to include the Katan as part of the Law for the Protection of Holy Places as it is recognized as part of the Western Wall. The groups advocate for cleanup and the placement of benches, prayer books and an ark for the Torah be permanently placed at the site.

On Rosh Hashana in 2006, a young Jewish boy was arrested for blowing a shofar (ceremonial horn instrument) while at the wall. The Muslim occupants of the area complained to the police for the breach of the peace and the police warned the boy to stop blowing the shofar in that area and instead invited him to do so at the main area of the Kotel in the Western Wall Plaza. The boy refused to obey the order of the police and continued to blow the shofar at the Kotel Katan. The police arrested the boy and seized his shofar. They let him go after three hours of questioning, keeping the shofar. He was admonished not to visit the area for 15 days. The boy later sued the police for wrongful arrest and theft of the shofar. In 2012, the Jerusalem Magistrate's Court ruled against the boy and in favor of the police on both issues, determining that the actions of the police were "legitimate".
