= Mughrabi Bridge =

Bridge in Jerusalem

Coordinates: 31°46′34.98″N 35°14′3.47″E

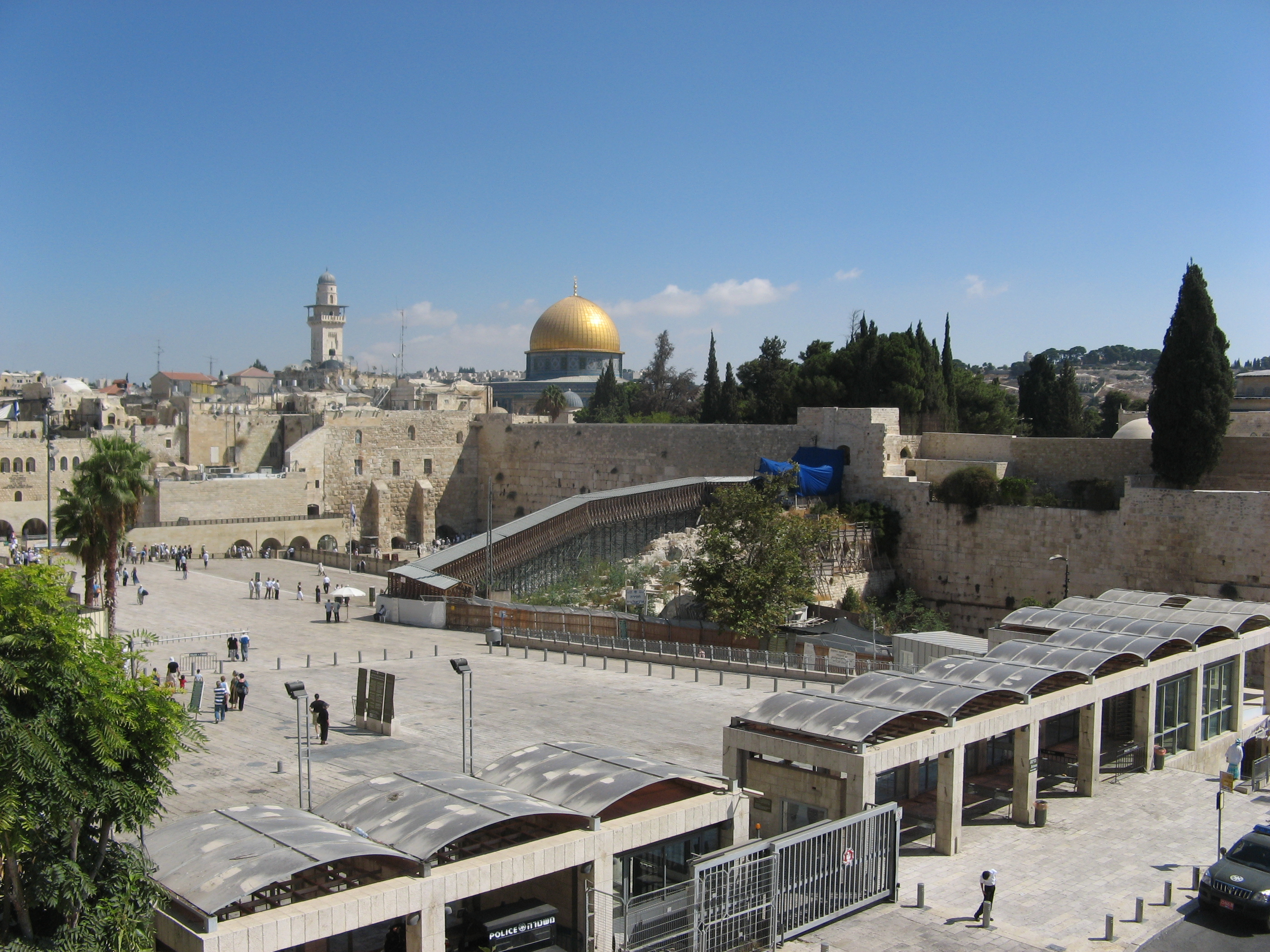
The Mughrabi Bridge

The Mughrabi Bridge is a wooden bridge connecting the Western Wall Plaza with the Mughrabi Gate of the Temple Mount in Jerusalem.

== History ==
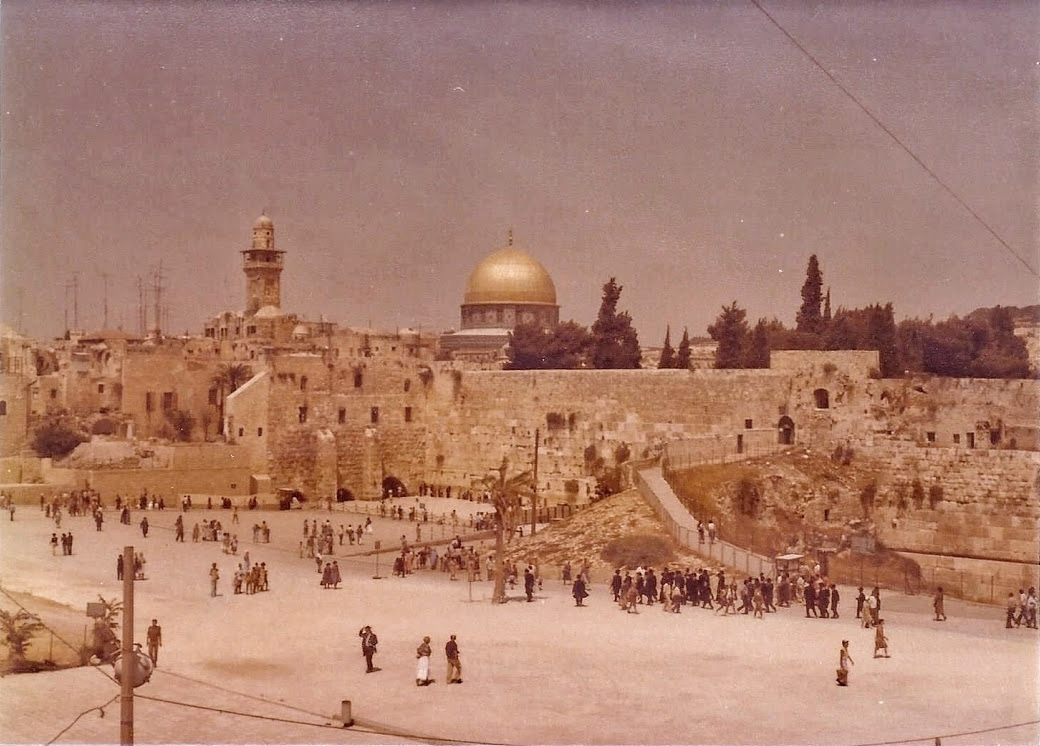
The old earthen ramp in the 1970s.

Until 2004 an earthen ramp allowed non-Muslim visitors direct access to the Temple Mount through the Mughrabi Gate. An 800-year-old wall holding back part of the hill jutting out from the Western Wall leading up to the Mughrabi Gate partially collapsed. Authorities believed a recent earthquake may have been responsible. During the winter of that year heavy snowfall (by Israeli standards) caused the ramp to collapse.

In 2007, the current wooden bridge was built, originally intended as a temporary measure that would stand for several months until a more permanent bridge was constructed. In order to build a permanent bridge, the remains of the old ramp and the earth under it had to be excavated, which resulted in accusations by the Waqf that Israel was trying to destabilise the Temple Mount and collapse the Dome of the Rock – 400 metres (1,300 ft) from the location of the ramp – which in turn resulted in international criticism, violent protests and calls for a third Intifada. Several of the neighbouring Arab states argued that the work threatened their internal stability, while other states threatened war.

As a result, the bridge was still standing at the end of 2011, when the city engineer of Jerusalem issued an order to close the structure because it was not safe. In 2012 and 2013, the support scaffolding of the bridge was replaced with a large metal beam structure and the area under the bridge was again open for visitors to walk around, resulting in a 1.5–2× increase in size of the Western Wall's women's prayer area (but not greater than the original area prior to construction).

=== 2014 addition ===
In August 2014, construction was started on a second bridge to the Mughrabi Gate. The second bridge would be a supplement to the 2007 Mughrabi Bridge. This secondary bridge became controversial, and at the wishes of the Jordanian government, work was halted and what had been built was torn down.

== Significance ==
The Mughrabi gate is the only gate to the Temple Mount that the Waqf allows non-Muslims to use for visiting the Temple Mount complex. The bridge is the only way to reach the gate.

The bridge and excavation of the historic ramp leading up to the gate have been a point of contention contributing to the hostility of the Arab–Israeli conflict.

== See also ==
- Gates of the Temple Mount
