= Al-Buraq Mosque =

Mosque in the al-Aqsa compound, Jerusalem

al-Buraq Mosque
- مَسْجِدُ ٱلْبُرَاق
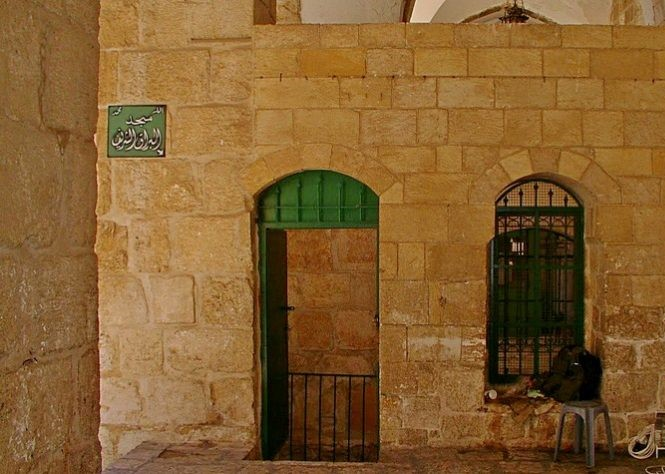
- Entrance to the mosque at the western portico (riwāq)

- Location of the mosque in the Old City of Jerusalem

Religion
- Affiliation: Islam
- Branch/tradition: Sunni
- Ecclesiastical or organisational status: Mosque
- Status: Active

Location
- Location: al-Aqsa compound, Old City, Jerusalem
- Interactive map of al-Buraq Mosque
- Coordinates: 31°46′35″N 35°14′04″E

Architecture
- Style: Mamluk
- Completed: c. 10th century CE (maybe earlier)

The al-Buraq Mosque (Arabic: مَسْجِدُ ٱلْبُرَاق, romanized: Masjid al-Burāq) is a subterranean musalla next to the Buraq Wall, near the southwest corner of the Masjid al-Aqsa compound in the Old City of Jerusalem. The mosque is called al-Buraq because of a ring that is nailed to its wall where Muslims believe Muhammad tied the buraq that carried him from the al-Haram Mosque to the al-Aqsa Mosque during the Night Journey.

== History ==
The first mention of the mosque, as "Marbat Al-Buraq", was made by the historian Ibn al-Faqih in 903 CE, where he mentioned that it is located in the corner of the Qibla lighthouse. The Qibla lighthouse is located in the southwestern corner and has been replaced by the current Al-Fakhriyyah minaret, dating from the Mamluk era.

The mosque is located inside the vaulted passage that once led to the old Hittah Gate, also known as Barclay's Gate, sealed with stones towards the end of the 10th century CE. In the early Islamic period, the gate was known to Muslims as it was mentioned by the Mufti of Jerusalem, Muhammad al-Taflati al-Maghribi (d. 1777 CE):

"It is the lower door, which is blocked by filling up soil and stones near the door of the Maghribeh Mosque."

— Muhammad al-Taflati al-Maghribi

The inside of the gate, which served as an entrance to the compound during the early Islamic period, is currently known as al-Buraq Mosque; (Note: Al-Ratrout's texts refer to Barclay's Gate by its former name of Bab Hittah — not to be confused with the current (and different) Bab Hittah near the Bab Hittah (Bab Hutta) neighborhood north of the compound. The current Bab Hittah was called Bab al-Asbat; the current Bab al-Asbat was called Mihrab Zakariyya (p. 350).) while it was known as "Marbat Al-Buraq" in the early periods. The entrance to the underground structure faces north and immediately left of the Moors' Gate, also known as Magharibah Gate (Bāb al-Magharibah).

It is believed that Salah al-Din al-Ayyubi closed the old Hittah Gate and established the al-Magharibah Gate in its place. Temple Mount traditionalists identify Barclay's Gate with the Kiponus Gate, mentioned as the western gate of the outer court in the Mishnah (Middot 3:1). They also suppose that the Kiponus Gate was named after Coponius (6–9 CE), a Roman procurator, thus one of the four gates described by Josephus.

== Etymology ==
The name Buraq come from the Arabic root of B-R-Q, to be a derivative and adjective of Arabic: برق barq "lightning/emitted lightning" or various general meanings stemming from the verb: "to beam, flash, gleam, glimmer, glisten, glitter, radiate, shimmer, shine, sparkle, twinkle".

== Architecture ==
According to the research of James Turner Barclay and his followers, the gate measures 5.06 metres (16.6 ft) wide and 8.80 metres (28.9 ft) high, which provides insight into the dimensions of the mosque. According to archeological sites, this gate was used as an entrance to the Temple Mount during the Umayyad period, in connection with structural features, such as the chamfered edge: a distinctive feature of all Umayyad gates in the vicinity, such as the Golden Gate and the Double Gate. A sign outside the mosque indicates that it dates from the Mamluk period. Overall, the gate passage was in use until some time after 985 CE, when it was blocked and changed into a cistern adjacent to al-Buraq Mosque. Even though the main gate of al-Buraq Mosque located in the Western Wall is permanently sealed, the mosque is accessible for worship from another entrance in Al-Aqsa mosque's western portico (riwāq).

At the end of the western corridor there is a gate that leads through steps to a rectangular underground room. On its southern side there is a small mihrab, and to its right there is a metal ring symbolizing the event when Muhammad tied the Buraq before entering the mosque on the Night of the Night Journey. In the west of the room, the upper part of a huge stone-blocked gate can be seen. Some believe that Muhammad entered through it, and then tied Al-Buraq next to the door, as it was previously a corridor for Al-Buraq Gate, then the place turned into Al-Buraq Musalla.

=== Metal ring ===
According to the traveler Abu Salem Al-Ayashi (1662 CE), it was a perforated stone on the outside of some of the western doors of Al-Aqsa Mosque. The stone is in a wall that people visit and seek blessings from, and they say that it is the one with which Prophet Muhammad tied Al-Buraq on the night of the Isra’. After 120 years, Al-Meknasy described the ring and said that the current ring (1785 CE) is not the place where Al-Buraq was tied, but it is a sign of the place, after the original place was backfilled by the soil.

== Gallery ==
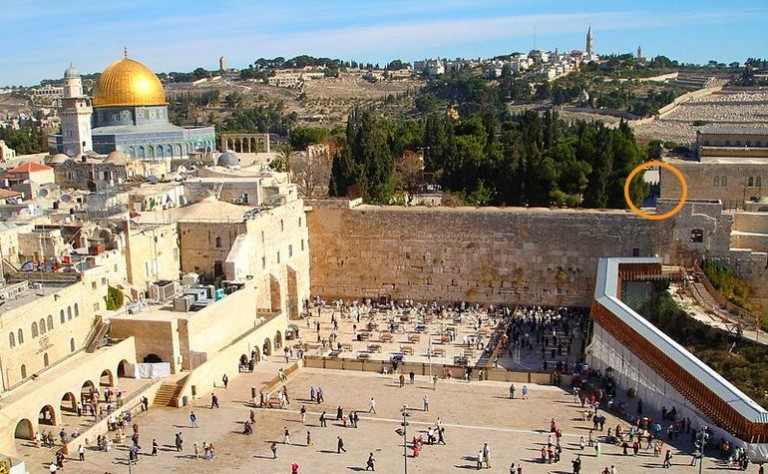
The Buraq Mosque located (circled in orange) beside the Western Wall (also known as Buraq Wall)

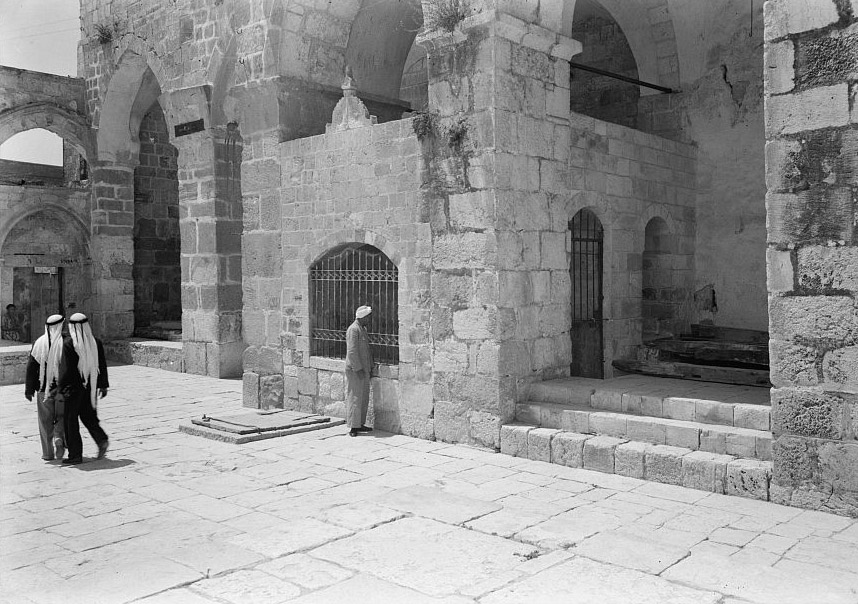
Al-Buraq Mosque, c. 1940, view towards south-west

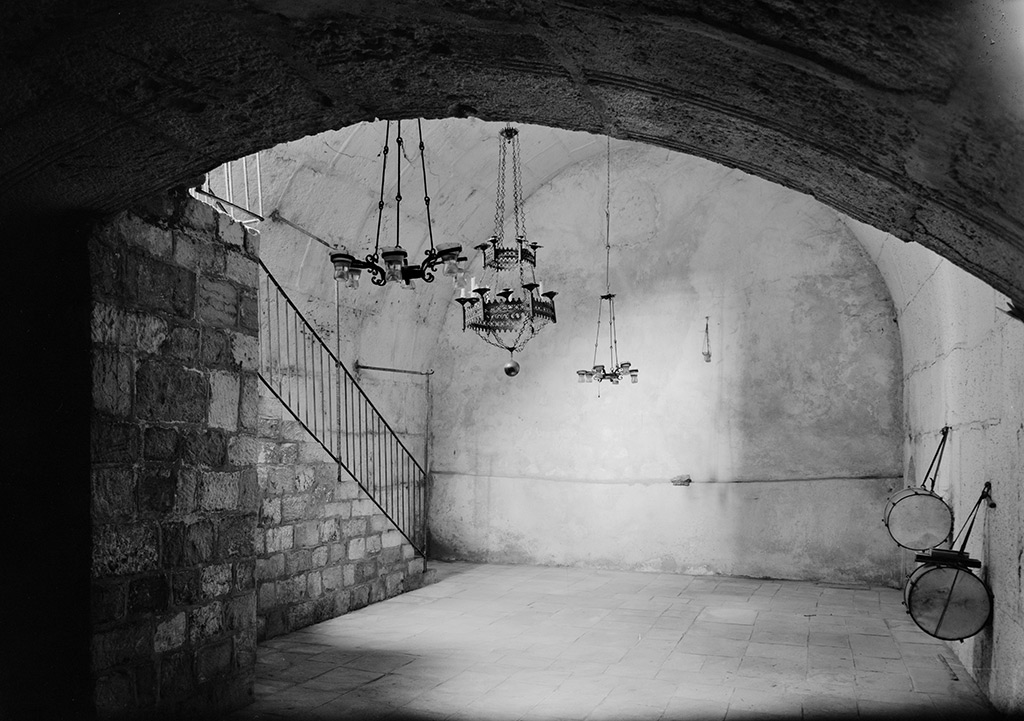
Vaulted space inside the subterranean chamber of Barclay's Gate, view towards east, c. 1940

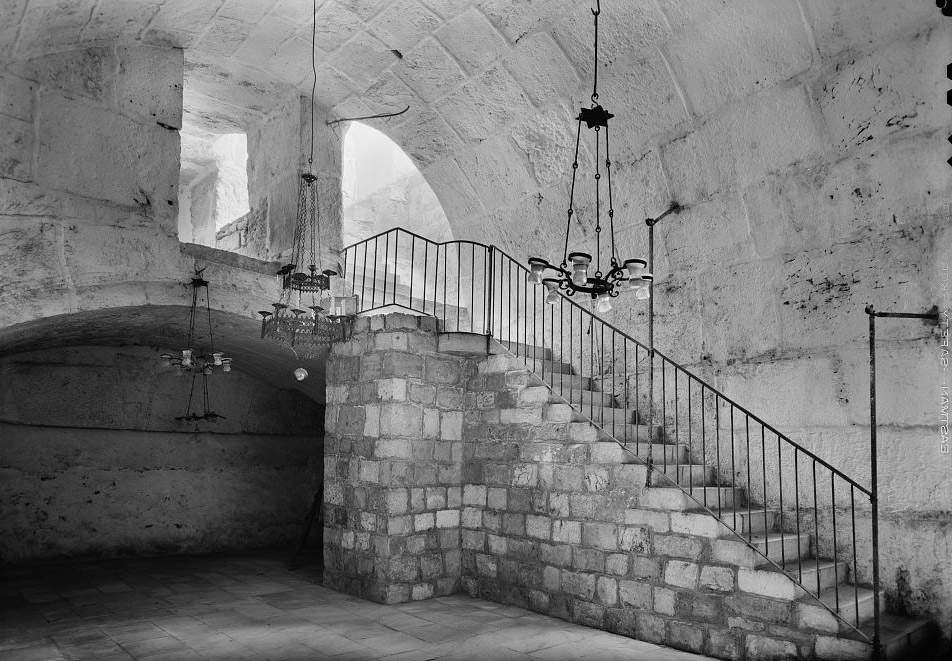
Vaulted space view towards the west, c. 1940

== See also ==
- List of mosques in Jerusalem
- Islam in Palestine
- Islam in Israel
