= James Turner Barclay =

American Biblical scholar (1807–1874)

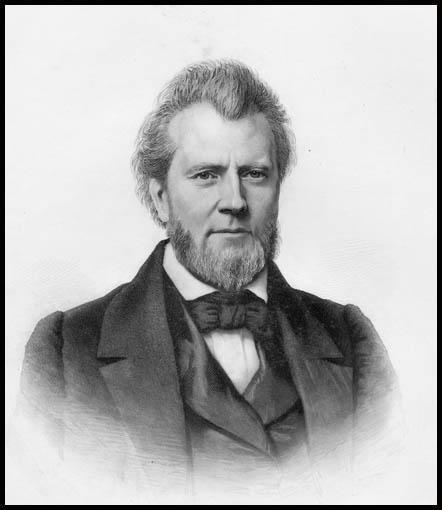
- Born: May 22, 1807; King William County, Virginia
- Died: October 20, 1874 (aged 67); Wheeler, Alabama

James Turner Barclay (born May 22, 1807, in King William County, Virginia, † October 20, 1874 in Wheeler, Alabama) was an American missionary and explorer of Ottoman Palestine.

== Life ==
James Turner Barclay was one of four children of Robert Barclay and Sarah Coleman Turner, and grandson of Thomas Barclay, first US consul to France and, later, consul to Morocco. In 1809, James' father, Robert Barclay, drowned in the Rappahannock River, and the widow married John Harris, a wealthy cotton merchant and owner of large estates in Albemarle County.

He enabled his stepson James Turner Barclay to study medicine at the University of Pennsylvania, which he completed in 1828 with a PhD. In 1830 he married Julia Ann Sowers. The couple settled in Charlottesville, where James Turner Barclay ran a pharmacy and devoted himself to drug development.

After Thomas Jefferson's death in 1826, Barclay purchased Jefferson's Monticello country estate in 1831, and carried out much criticized changes there in order to start a sericulture. As early as 1836, for financial reasons, he was forced to sell the country estate to Uriah Levy.

Barclay had turned to Presbyterianism since his marriage. He became increasingly religious, joined the Disciples of Christ Church and its splinter group, the American Christian Missionary Society, which emerged from Presbyterianism, and became a preacher of this church in Scottsville in 1849. The rapidly growing Disciples of Christ Church sent Barclay to Jerusalem as their first foreign missionary in the winter of 1851, at the age of 44, where he stayed and worked as a medical and evangelistic missionary until the outbreak of the Crimean War in 1854. During Barclay's first year in Jerusalem, he treated more than 2,000 malaria cases. Upon his return to the United States, he began making earnest efforts to publish his book.

By 1858, Barclay had returned with his family to Jerusalem, which stint lasted another three years, when he returned to the United States in 1861. In 1861, at the eve of the US Civil War, he published a series of articles for the Disciples' journal, The Millennial Harbinger, entitled "The Welfare of the World Bound Up with the Destiny of Israel," in which he began to encourage the immigration of Jews to the Holy Land.

Barclay saw the immigration of Jews to Ottoman Palestine as a sign of the end times and wanted to participate in salvation history by winning these religious Jews over to Christianity (millenarianism). To his disappointment, he met with rejection and was only able to baptize a few people. As a means of making a livelihood he worked as a physician, treating primarily malaria cases. While in Jerusalem, he conducted various geographical and archaeological studies, and also supported Edward Robinson in his research.

One of his patients was Nazir Effendi, a Turkish architect who was doing repair work on the Dome of the Rock. Barclay was given the opportunity to roam around the Haram esh-Sharif as his assistant, making drawings and measurements. Financial reasons led to the abandonment of the first Palestine mission.

Back in the United States, Barclay found a job with the Philadelphia Mint for his metallurgical skills.

In 1857 Barclay published his seminal work, The City of the Great King. The illustrations in the book are based on Barclay's photographs and drawings. In the same year, Barclay and his family returned to Jerusalem for another eight years. From 1868 he taught science at Bethany College in West Virginia, an institution of the Disciples of Christ Church. He spent his twilight years as a preacher in Wheeler, Alabama, where he died.

In 1906, Barclay's remains were exhumed and interred at Campbell Cemetery in Bethany, Brooke County, West Virginia.

== Research in Jerusalem ==
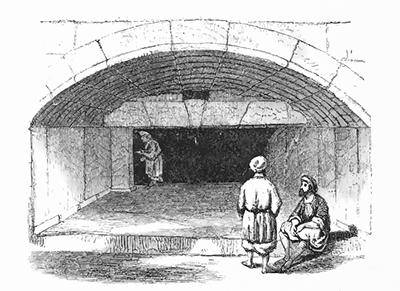
Al-Buraq Mosque, drawn by Barclay after a brief visit (1851–4). The back wall closes off the passage to "Barclay's Gate".

Barclay is known as an explorer of the Barclay Gate, an ancient gateway to the Jerusalem Temple which was sealed-off in his day, and which has since been named after him. The lintel of this gate is directly below the Maghrabi gate used by the tourists today to enter the Temple Mount from the west. Barclay discovered the Herodian-period gate while surveying the Temple precincts (Arabic: Ḥaram) in 1848. It is located slightly north of the ramp leading up to the Mugrabin Gate (Moors' Gate), and only part of it is still visible. After the original gate had been filled-in, the corridor into which it led had been made into a cistern. Barclay, describing the Gate, wrote: "It is directly below what is now Mugrabin Gate, and most of it is currently hidden by the house of the town clerk Abu Seul Effendi. Twenty feet and two inches of the lintel are visible today, and six feet and nine inches is its width; that's probably only half the original width. This lintel is only about four feet above the current floor level..." A complete description of Barclay's Gate is had in Sir Charles Warren's and Claude R. Conder's book Jerusalem, published by the Palestine Exploration Fund of London, besides being described also by Charles William Wilson. Other features of the Temple Mount enclosure (Ḥaram esh-Sharif) were also described by Barclay.

During the time in which he had access to the Haram, Barclay continues, he discovered part of a closed gate system in the Buraq mosque in the direct vicinity of this ancient lintel; but the guards of the holy place had been so restless about his presence there that it seemed advisable to him to make a hasty sketch and never come back. Indeed, in ancient times, one could ascend through a gallery with stairs from the Barclay Gate to the height of the Herodian temple platform. In the early 14th century, this gallery was walled up in the west and converted into the small Buraq mosque.

In the winter of 1854, Barclay examined Zedekiah's Cave which he called the Great Cavern Quarry in the north-west of the old city of Jerusalem and was the first in modern history to describe in great detail its interior recess. Barclay also explored a subterranean passageway leading from the Virgin's Fount (now called Gihon Spring), which channel led to a point within a short distance from the Mugrabin Gate, where it turned abruptly to the west, and where he could proceed no further because of it being blocked by stones and fallen debris. According to his hypothesis, the channel was made "to discharge surplus water into the Ophel channel, in order that it might be reservoired in the Pool of Siloam."

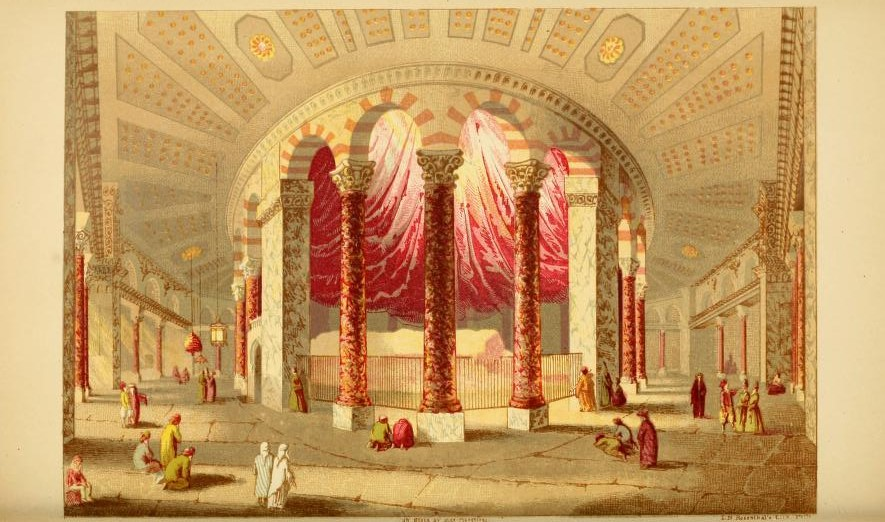
Interior view of the Dome of the Rock (Barclay - 1858)

Barclay's research, while pioneering in many respects, often lacked qualified, scientific data. As a result, some of his identifications of historic sites have been refuted by late biblical scholars, such as his identification of the Tower of David (Phasael's Tower) with the Hippicus Tower. Barclay, however, supplemented his work by providing many illustrations of Jerusalem in his day, as well as of plans and maps, which greatly enhanced the contemporary knowledge of Jerusalem. He also provided measurements of several buildings and sites, including the Dome of the Rock, and a description of the Al-Aqsa mosque.

Barclay was avant-garde in tracing the remains of a Roman-era built aqueduct, which led from Artas (in southwestern Judea) to the Temple Mount, in Jerusalem.

In the years spent in Jerusalem, Barclay notes that there were fourteen synagogues, with a Jewish population of about 10,249, a Christian population of about 4,515, and the rest (presumably Muslim) numbering some 15,000, many of whom resident Turks, for a total population of 30,000.

== Publication ==
- The City of the Great King, or Jerusalem as It Was, and It Is, and as It Is To Be. Philadelphia 1857 (Reprint New York 1977)

== Bibliography ==
- Barclay, J.T. (1857). City of the Great King (or, Jerusalem as it Was, as it Is, and as it To Be). Philadelphia: James Challen and Sons. OCLC 1152738303. (reprint: OCLC 980280533)
- Blowers, Paul M. (1993). ""Living in a Land of Prophets": James T. Barclay and an Early Disciples of Christ Mission to Jews in the Holy Land". Church History. 62 (4): 494–513. doi:10.2307/3168074. JSTOR 3168074.
- Lewis, J.P. (1988). "James Turner Barclay: Explorer of Nineteenth-Century Jerusalem". The Biblical Archaeologist. 51 (3). The University of Chicago Press: 163–170. doi:10.2307/3210066. JSTOR 3210066. S2CID 163772232.
