= Zedekiah's Cave =

Underground quarry in Jerusalem

- Solomon's Quarries
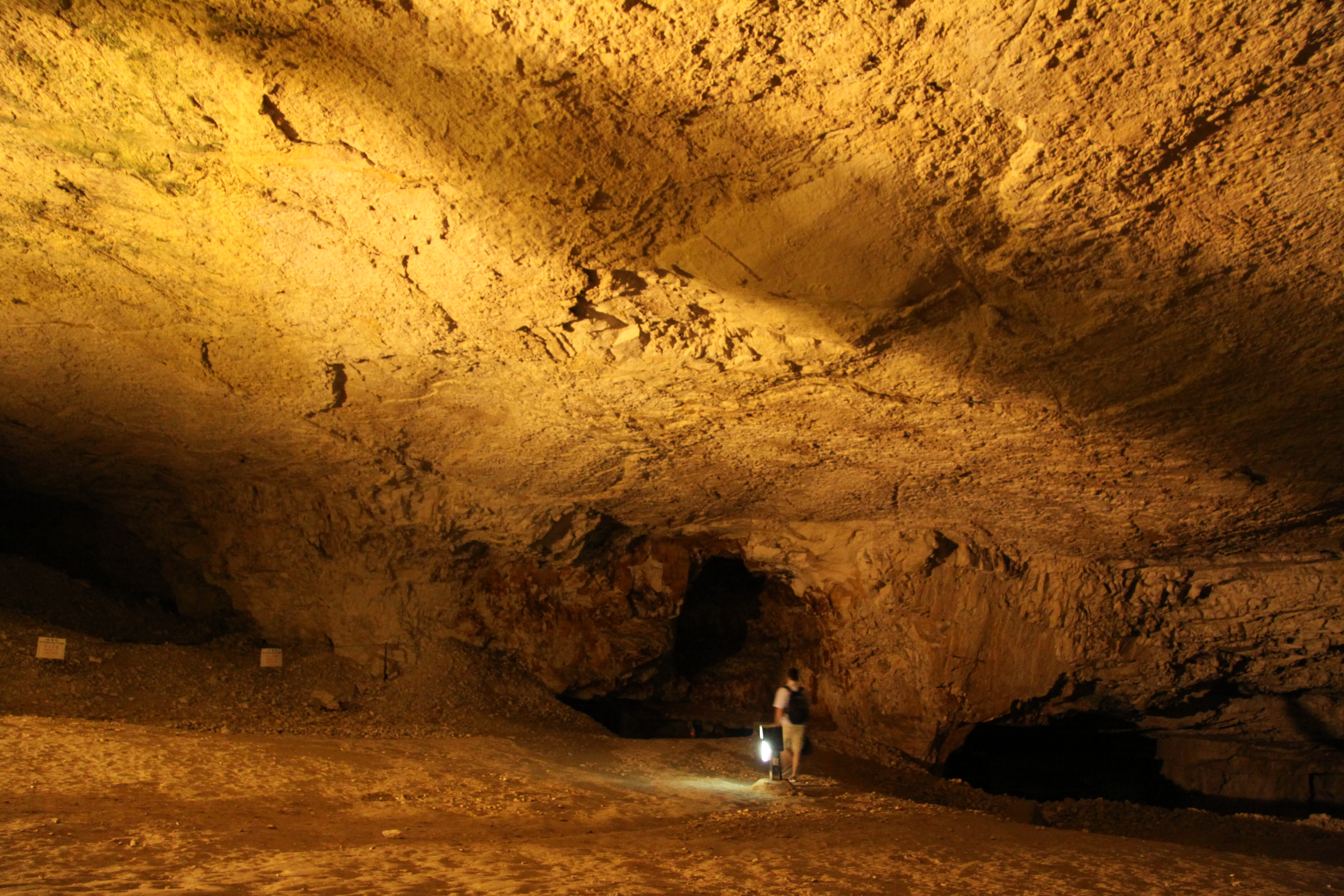
- Interactive map of Zedekiah's Cave
- Type: Quarry

Site notes
- Public access: Yes

Zedekiah's Cave, also known as Solomon's Quarries, is a 5-acre (20,000 m^{2}) underground meleke limestone quarry under the Muslim Quarter of the Old City of Jerusalem that runs the length of five city blocks, named after King Zedekiah (Tzidkiyahu; a Judean king of the 6th century BC). It was carved over a period of several thousand years and is a remnant of the largest quarry in Jerusalem.

== Names ==
In addition to Zedekiah's Cave and Solomon's Quarries, this site has been called Zedekiah's Grotto, Suleiman's Cave, the Royal Caverns (or Royal Caves or Royal Quarries), and Korah's Cave. The Arabic name Migharat al-Kitan (or "Cotton Cave") has also been used; the cavern is thought to have been once used as a storage place for cotton.

== Geography ==
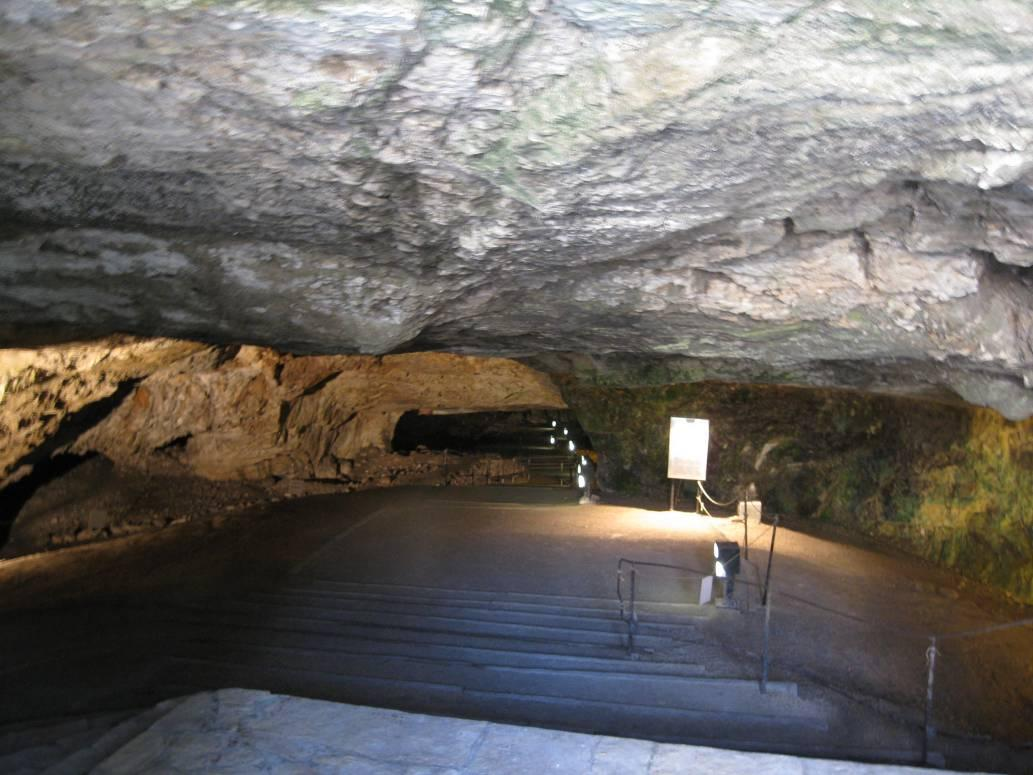
The sloping down entrance into Zedekiah's Cave

The entrance to Zedekiah's Cave is just beneath the Old City wall, between the Damascus and Herod Gates, about 500 feet (150 m) east of the former. Beyond the narrow entrance, the cave slopes down into a vast 300-foot-long auditorium-like chamber. Drops of water, known as "Zedekiah's tears", trickle through the ceiling.

Beyond the "auditorium" are a series of artificial galleries hewn by ancient stonecutters into chaotic, sometimes bizarre, patterns and formations. Paths give access to every corner of the quarry system, which takes at least 30 minutes to explore thoroughly. Chisel marks are visible in many sections and in some galleries huge, nearly finished building blocks destined for some long-ago structure are locked into the rock where the stonecutters left them centuries ago. In a few places the stones are marked in Arabic, Latin, Greek, Armenian and English by means of charcoal and engraved etchings (e.g., "W. E. Blackstone Jan. 1889"). Several plaques explaining some of the myriad legends associated with the site have been mounted on the cave walls.

From entrance to the farthest point, the cave extends about 650 feet (200 m). Its maximum width is about 330 feet (100 m) and its depth is generally about 30 feet (9.1 m) below the street level of the Muslim Quarter, although there are several lower levels and blocked tunnels too.

== History ==
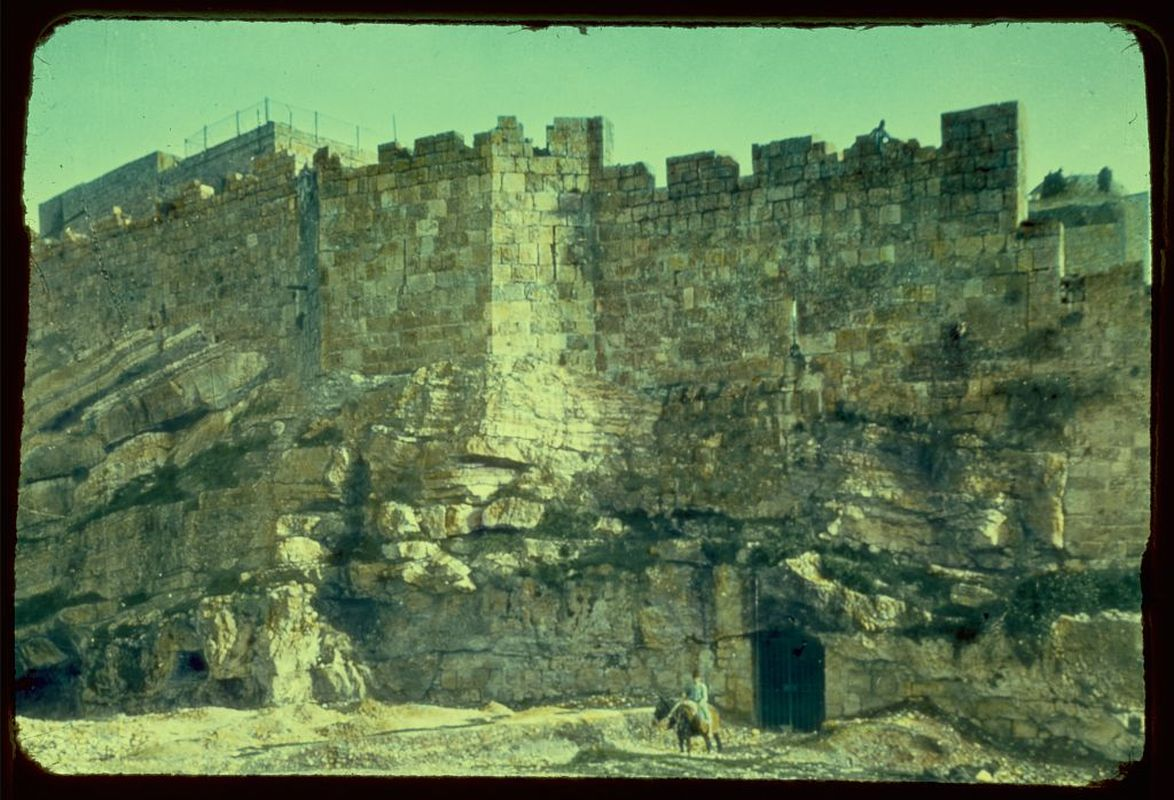
Entrance to Zedekiah's Cave, 1950

Only the mouth of the cave is natural. The interior was carved over a period of several thousand years.

Herod the Great used the main quarry at Zedekiah's Cave for building blocks in the renovation of the Temple and its retaining walls, including what is known today as the Western Wall. Stone from the quarry may also have been used for the building projects of Herod Agrippa I. The subterranean quarry would have been usable in all seasons and any weather. The Roman-Jewish historian Flavius Josephus writes about the "Royal Caverns" of the Old City, which may have been a reference to Zedekiah's Cave.

The medieval midrash Numbers Rabbah mentions the cave: "One who observed the Sabbath in a cave, even though it be like the cave of Zedekiah, which was eighteen miles long, may walk through the whole of it".

Suleiman the Magnificent (1494–1566), the Ottoman sultan who built the present walls around the Old City, also apparently mined the quarry, ultimately sealing it up around 1540 because of security concerns.

In 1854 the American missionary James Turner Barclay followed rumors of a cavern near the Damascus Gate, and, apparently with the help of his dog, discovered the entrance. Barclay and his two sons returned secretly at night and explored the cave.

In 1873, French archeologist Charles Clermont-Ganneau uncovered a crude carving of a winged creature in a small niche in the cave. It had two long narrow wings that opened like a pair of scissors, a curled tail and a bearded human head under a conical headdress. The site is now marked by a plaque.

In the mid-1880s, the cave was occupied by a German religious sect that was eventually evacuated by the German Consul in Jerusalem after many of the group fell ill from living in the damp, unsanitary conditions.

Some minor quarrying occurred in 1907 when stone was obtained to be used in the Ottoman clock tower over the Jaffa Gate. Otherwise, the site was not frequented again until the 1920s, when it began to be something of a tourist attraction.

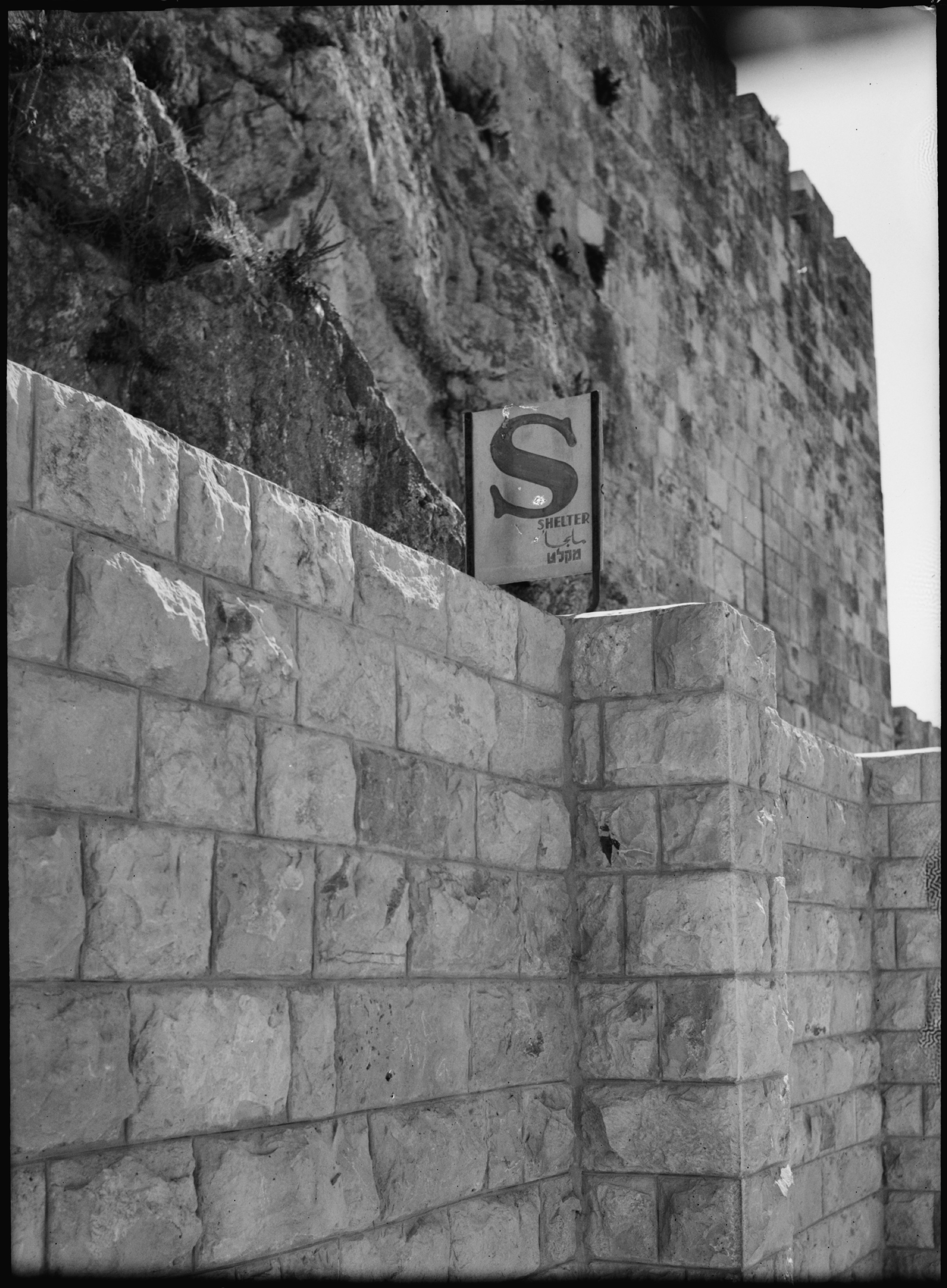
Entrance to the cave in 1945 when it was used as a bomb shelter

In 1968, a resident of East Jerusalem contacted the Israeli Ministry of Finance with a claim that, during the Ottoman period, his grandfather had buried three cases of gold in Zedekiah's Cave. He claimed he could show officials where the treasure was buried in return for 25% of the gold. The Ministry agreed, but, according to The Jerusalem Post, after digging a deep hole no gold was found.

In the mid-1980s, The Jerusalem Foundation built paths and installed lights throughout the cavern, facilitating tourist access. In the late 20th century, the East Jerusalem Development Corporation carried out restorations of the cave.

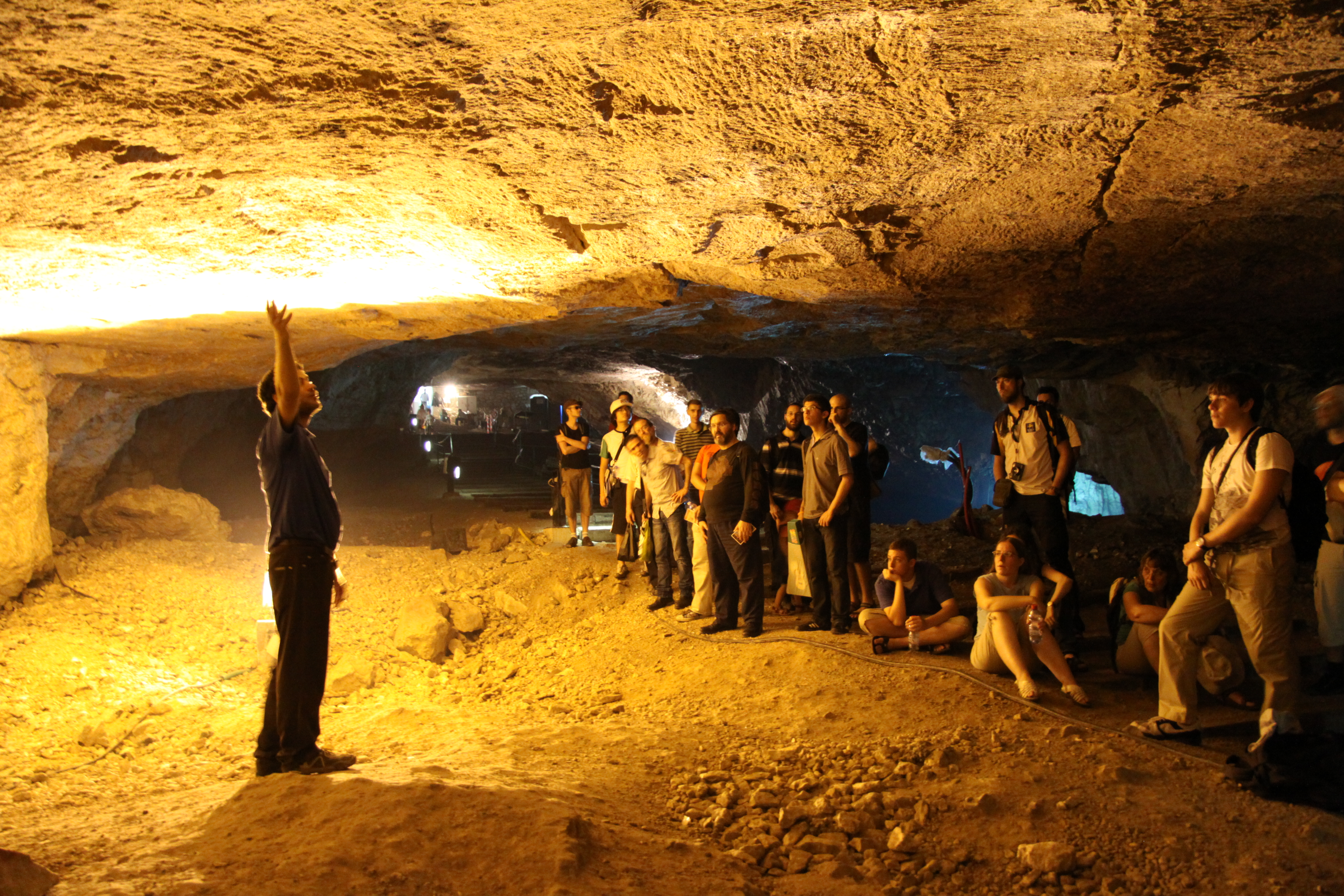
Wikimania 2011 touring the cave

The cave reopened to the public in 2023 after three years of renovation and the installation of an audiovisual show.

== Archaeology ==
Excavations were conducted in 2000 and 2002 for the purpose of determining the periods of use. The wall generally attributed to the Ottoman period was found to have been constructed earlier, in the 13th century, i.e. during the Mamluk period. A small number of fragments from the Iron Age were uncovered, but most remains were from the Roman and Byzantine periods. Further excavation in 2011 found an area that had been closed off for the use of quarry workers, probably in the late Islamic period.

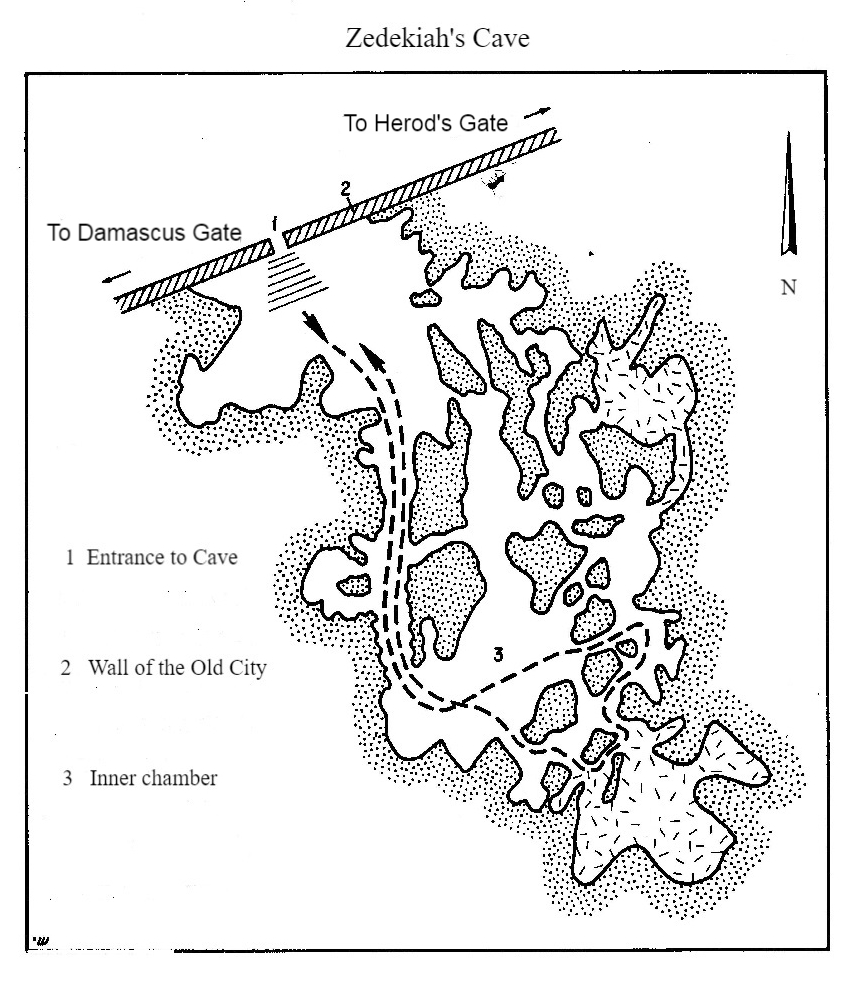
Map of Zedekiah's Cave

== Biblical associations ==
According to local lore, the cave served as a quarry for the First Temple of Israel; King Solomon's Temple. The meleke limestone of the quarry – which is strong, well suited to carving, and resistant to erosion – is thought to have been used for royal buildings. The name meleke is derived from Hebrew and Arabic words meaning "kingly" or "royal".

In the 10th century, Muslim geographer and writer Al-Mukaddasi wrote: "There is at Jerusalem, outside the city, a huge cavern. According to what I have heard from learned men, and also have read in books, it leads into the place where lie the people slain by Moses. But there is no surety in this, for apparently it is but a stone quarry, with passages leading therefrom, along which one may go with torches." The "people slain by Moses" refers to a story that appears in both the Bible and the Quran about a man named Korah (Arabic, Karun) who mounted a revolt against Moses and his brother Aaron, maintaining that they had led the children of Israel out of Egypt under false pretenses. According to the Old Testament, Korah and his fellow rebels were swallowed up by the earth.

The cave was also said to be the hiding place of King Zedekiah (Tzidkiyahu; a Judean king of the 6th century BC), with the Biblical commentator Rashi writing that Zedekiah hid here to escape the soldiers of Babylonian king Nebuchadnezzar I during the siege of Jerusalem in 597 BC. According to Rashi, "(t)here was a cave from the palace of Zedekiah to the plain of Jericho and he fled through the cave." He added that God sent a buck running along the surface on top of the cave as Zedekiah was walking down below. The soldiers chased the buck and arrived at the exit of the cave just as Zedekiah was coming out, enabling them to capture and blind him. Thus was born the legend and name of "Zedekiah's Cave". The Radak repeats this story.

== Freemasons ==
Masonic ceremonies have been held at the cave since the 1860s. According to Masonic ritual, King Solomon was their first grand master. In 1868, a ceremony was conducted by a past grand master of the state of Kentucky. The first Masonic lodge in the Holy Land, known as the Royal Solomon Mother Lodge No. 293, met in the cave on May 7, 1873.

The Freemasons of Israel consider it one of the most revered sites in Masonic history. According to the Supreme Grand Royal Arch Chapter of the State of Israel, the site "has special meaning for Mark Master Masons and the Royal Arch Masons in particular". Starting in the 1920s, in the early years of the British Mandate, the cave was used for the ceremony of Mark Master Masons. Although this practice was temporarily suspended between the years 1948 and 1968, the impressive ceremony of the consecration of the Supreme Grand Royal Arch Chapter of the State of Israel was commenced again in the spring of 1969, and ever since then (as if 1989), the Mark degree has been performed in the caves once a year on average. On May 10, 2015, a Masonic initiation was held in the cave on the occasion of a visit of Masons from the Grand Lodge of California to the Grand Lodge of Israel.

== See also ==
- Tourism in Israel
- Roman graffiti
