= Baybars (disambiguation) =

Baybars or Baibars (Arabic: بيبرس) is a given name of Kipchak Turkic origin. It may refer to:

- Baybars I (1223–1277), fourth sultan of Mamluk Egypt
- Baybars II (d. 1310), twelfth sultan of Mamluk Egypt
- Baybars al-Mansuri (d. 1325), Mamluk official and historiographer
- Baibars (Trinity Blood character)

== See also ==
- Rukn al-Din (disambiguation)
