= Haizum =

Mythological horse of an Angel in Islam

In Islam, Haizum is the name of the mare (female horse) of an Angel from the 3rd Heaven, whom Allah (God) sent among other angels as reinforcements to help the Muslims in fighting the polytheists in the Battle of Badr.

It is mentioned in the Authentic Hadith reported in Sahih Muslim (1763)
