= Hosh (architecture) =

Traditional Arab courtyard

A hosh (Arabic: حوش, romanized: ḥūš), or hawsh, is a courtyard in some traditional residential complexes in the Arab world. It represents the center of the housing structure.
