= Old City of Jerusalem =

Walled area in East Jerusalem

Coordinates: 31°46′36″N 35°14′03″E

Old City of Jerusalem and its Walls
UNESCO World Heritage Site
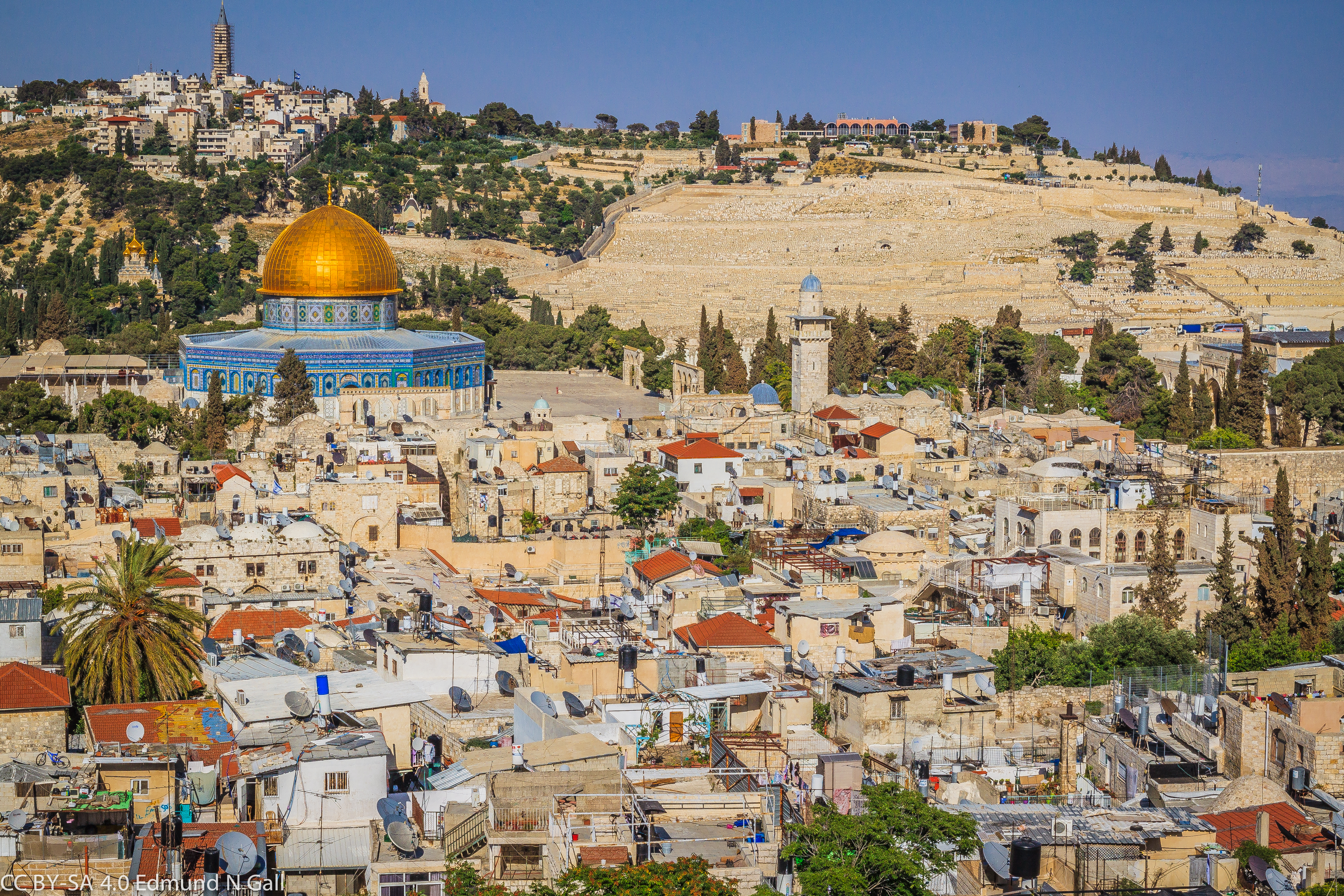
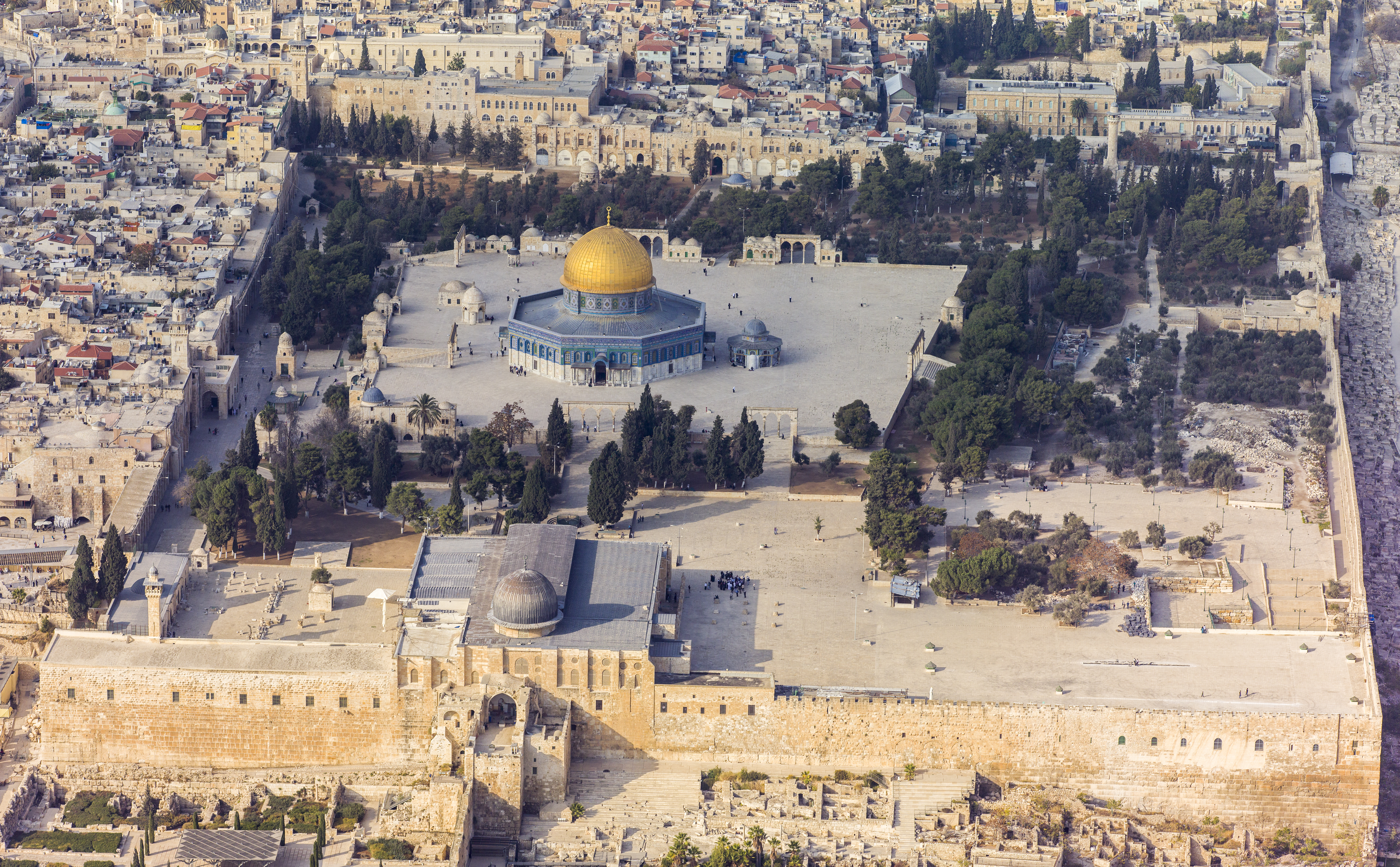
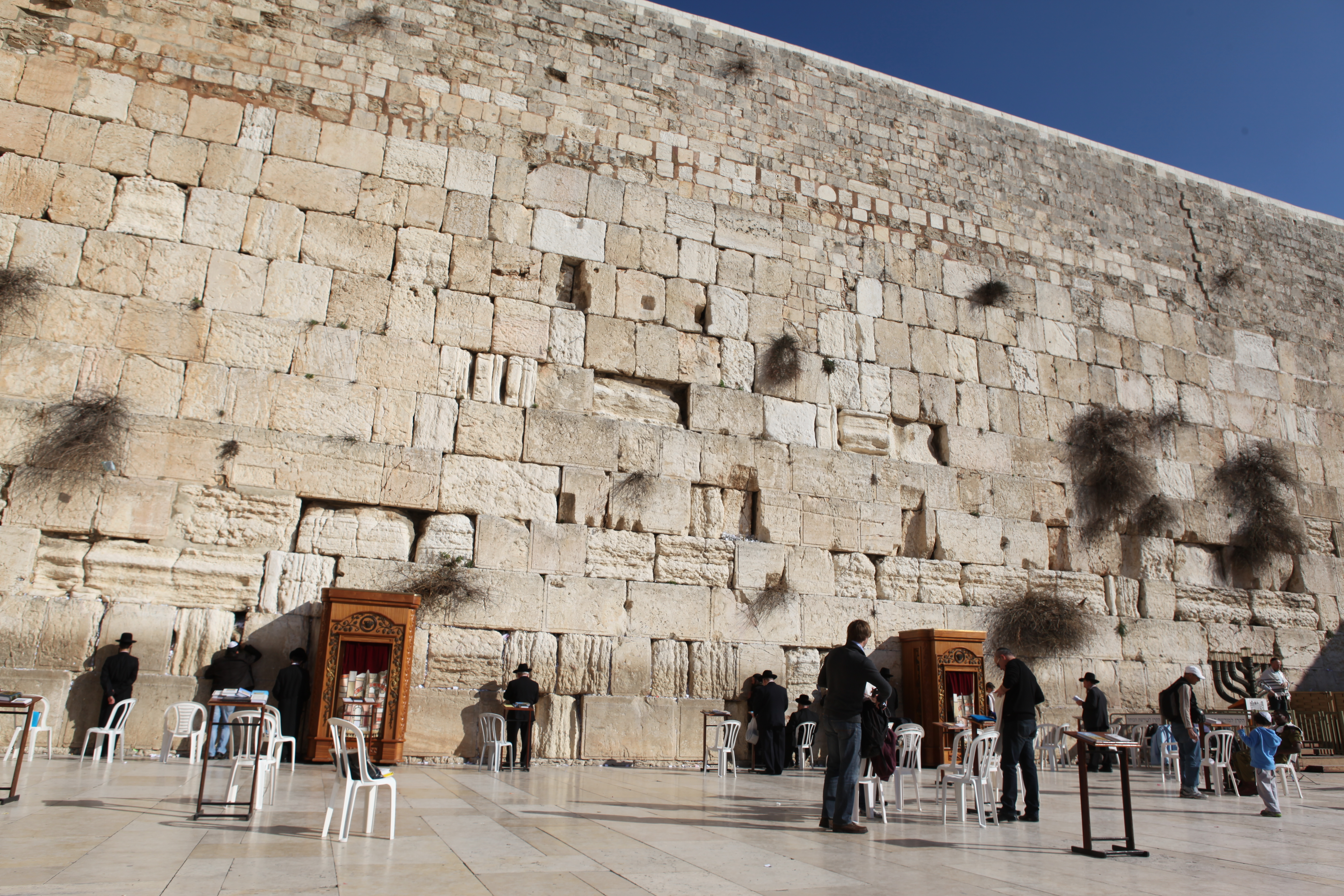
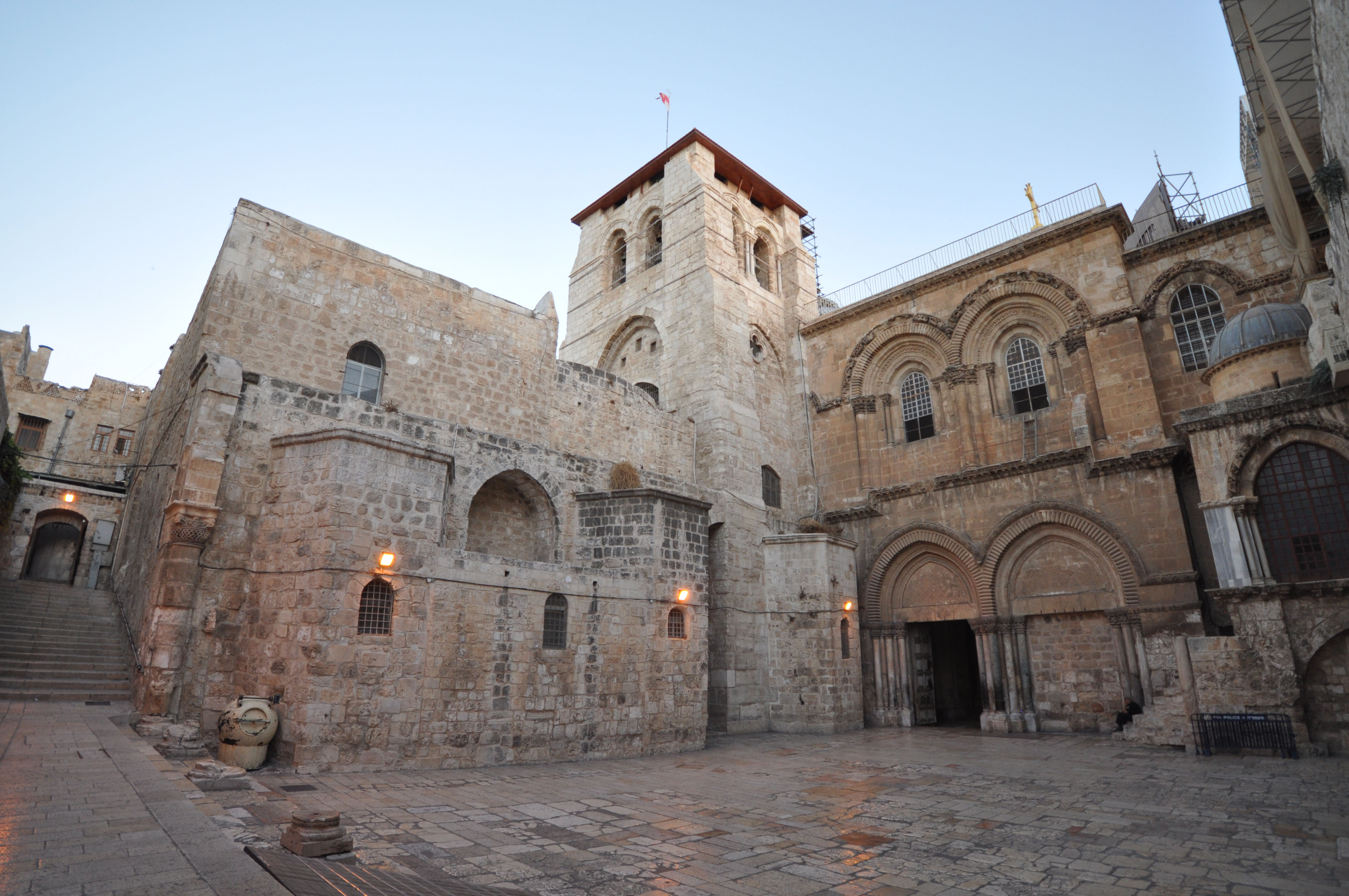
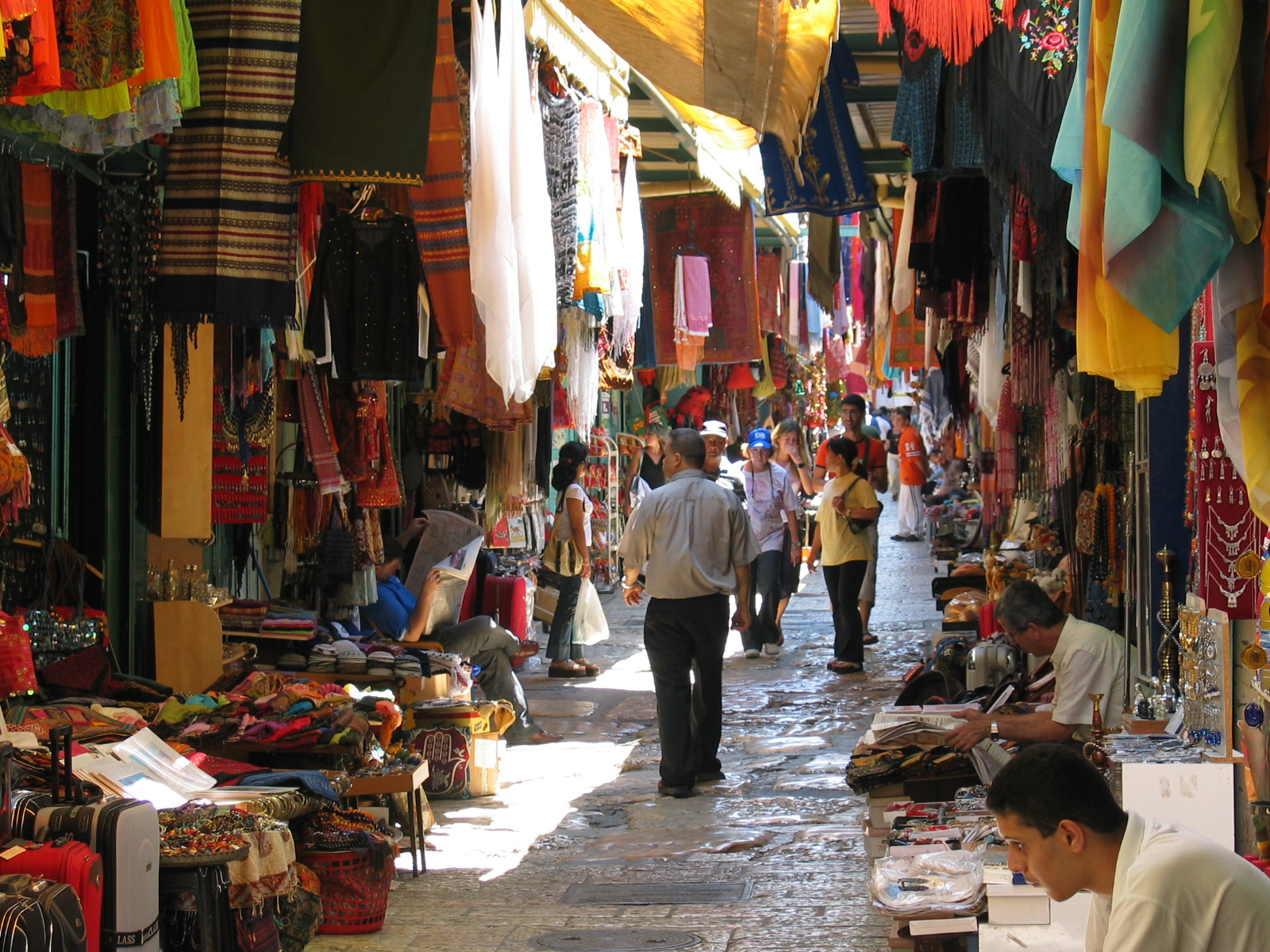
- Clockwise from top: View of the Old City and the Mount of Olives; The Western Wall; Arab bazaar in the Old City; Entrance view of the Church of the Holy Sepulchre; Aerial view of Al-Aqsa Mosque Compound (Temple Mount), including its Dome of the Rock and the Qibli (Al-Aqsa) Mosque
- Interactive map of Old City of Jerusalem and its Walls
- Location: East Jerusalem
- Criteria: Cultural: ii, iii, vi
- Reference: 148
- Inscription: 1981 (5th Session)
- Endangered: 1982–present

The Old City of Jerusalem (Note: /ˌoʊld ˈsɪti əv dʒəˈuːsələm/; Hebrew: הָעִיר הַעֲתִיקָה, romanized: Ha'ír Ha'atiká; Arabic: المدينة القديمة, romanized: al-Madīna al-Qadīma, lit. "the Old City") is a 0.9-square-kilometre (0.35 sq mi) walled area in East Jerusalem.

In a tradition that may have begun with an 1840s British map of the city, the Old City is divided into four uneven quarters: the Muslim Quarter, the Christian Quarter, the Armenian Quarter, and the Jewish Quarter. A fifth area is the Al-Aqsa Mosque compound or Al-Masjid Al-Aqsa (Temple Mount hill) and home to the monumental Dome of the Rock, the Qibli (Al-Aqsa) Mosque, and was once the site of the Jewish Temple.

The Old City's modern walls and city gates were built by the Ottoman Empire from 1535 to 1542 under Suleiman the Magnificent. The Old City is home to several sites of key importance and holiness to the three major Abrahamic religions: the Temple Mount area and the Western Wall for Judaism, the Church of the Holy Sepulchre for Christianity, and the Al-Aqsa Mosque compound including its Dome of the Rock and Qibli Mosque for Islam. The Old City, along with its walls, was added to the World Heritage Site list of UNESCO in 1981.

In spite of its name, the Old City of Jerusalem's current layout is different from that of ancient times. Most archeologists believe that the City of David, an archaeological site on a rocky spur south of the Temple Mount, was the original settlement core of Jerusalem during the Bronze and Iron Ages. At times, the ancient city spread to the east and north, covering Mount Zion and the Temple Mount. The Old City as defined by the walls of Suleiman is thus shifted a bit northwards compared to earlier periods of the city's history, and smaller than it had been in its peak, during the late Second Temple period. The Old City's current layout has been documented in significant detail, notably in old maps of Jerusalem over the last 1,500 years.

Until the mid-19th century, the entire city of Jerusalem, with the exception of David's Tomb complex, was enclosed within the Old City walls. The departure from the walls began in the 19th century, when the city's municipal borders were expanded to include Arab villages such as Silwan and new Jewish neighborhoods such as Mishkenot Sha'ananim. The Old City came under Jordanian control following the 1948 Arab–Israeli War. During the 1967 Six-Day War, Israel occupied East Jerusalem; since then, the entire city has been under Israeli control. Israel unilaterally asserted in its 1980 Jerusalem Law that the whole of Jerusalem was Israel's capital. In international law, East Jerusalem is defined as territory occupied by Israel.

== Population ==
The population of the Old City resides mostly in the Muslim quarter. In 2007, the total population was 36,965; there were 27,500 Muslims (growing to over 30,000 by 2013); 5,681 non-Armenian Christians, 790 Armenians (who decreased in number to about 500 by 2013); and 3,089 Jews (with almost 3,000 plus some 1,500 yeshiva students by 2013). By 2020, Old City's population dropped to 31,120.

== Political status ==
During the 1948 Arab–Israeli War, the Old City was captured by Jordan and all its Jewish residents were evicted. During the Six-Day War in 1967, which saw hand-to-hand fighting on the Temple Mount, Israeli forces captured the Old City along with the rest of East Jerusalem, subsequently annexing them as Israeli territory and reuniting them with the western part of the city. Today, the Israeli government controls the entire area, which it considers part of its national capital. However, the Jerusalem Law of 1980, which effectively annexed East Jerusalem to Israel, was declared null and void by United Nations Security Council Resolution 478. East Jerusalem is now regarded by the international community as part of occupied Palestinian territory.

== History ==
=== Israelite period ===
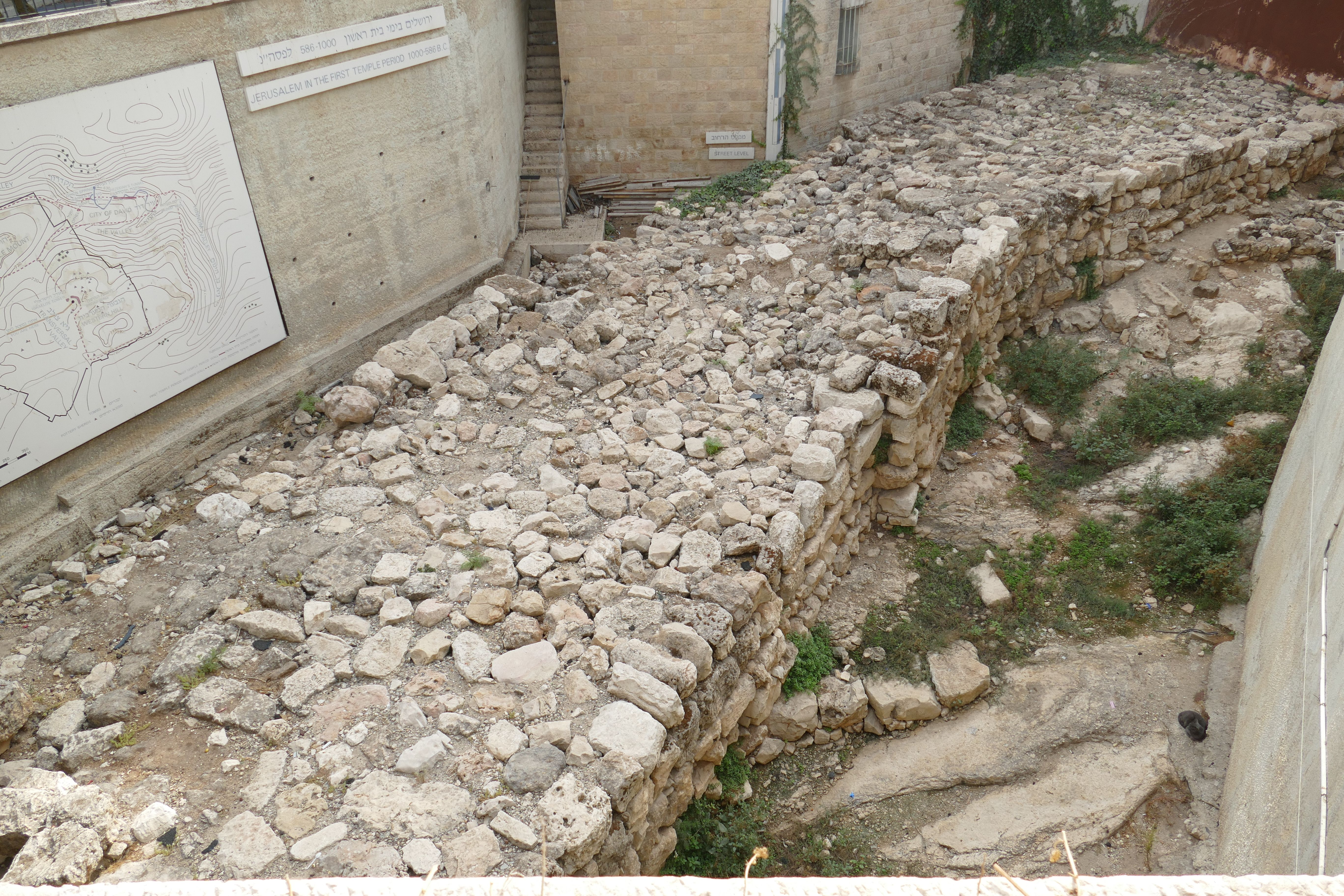
The Broad Wall, part of the wall surrounding the city's western hill, built by Hezekiah, king of Judah, during the late-8th century BCE

According to the Hebrew Bible, before King David's conquest of Jerusalem in the 11th century BCE the city was home to the Jebusites. The Bible describes the city as heavily fortified with a strong city wall, a fact confirmed by archaeology. The Bible names the city ruled by King David as the City of David, in Hebrew Ir David, which was identified southeast of the Old City walls, outside the Dung Gate. In the Bible, David's son, King Solomon, extended the city walls to include the Temple and Temple Mount. After the partition of the United Kingdom of Israel, the southern tribes remained in Jerusalem, with the city becoming the capital of the Kingdom of Judah.

Jerusalem was largely extended westwards after the Neo-Assyrian destruction of the northern Kingdom of Israel and the resulting influx of refugees. King Hezekiah had been preparing for an Assyrian invasion by fortifying the walls of the capital, building towers, and constructing a tunnel to bring fresh water to the city from a spring outside its walls. He made at least two major preparations that would help Jerusalem to resist conquest: the construction of the Siloam Tunnel, and construction of the Broad Wall.

The First Temple period ended around 586 BCE, as Nebuchadnezzar's Neo-Babylonian Empire conquered Judah and Jerusalem, and laid waste to Solomon's Temple and the city.

=== Second Temple period ===
In 538 BCE, the Persian King Cyrus the Great invited the Jews of Babylon to return to Judah to rebuild the Temple. Construction of the Second Temple was completed in 516 BCE, during the reign of Darius the Great, 70 years after the destruction of the First Temple.

In about 440 BCE, the city was rebuilt on a smaller scale during the Persian period, when, according to the Bible, Nehemiah led the Jews who returned from the Babylonian Exile. An additional, so-called Second Wall, was built by King Herod the Great, who also expanded the Temple Mount and rebuilt the Temple. In 41–44 CE, Agrippa, king of Judea, started building the so-called "Third Wall" around the northern suburbs. The entire city was totally destroyed by the Romans in 70 CE.

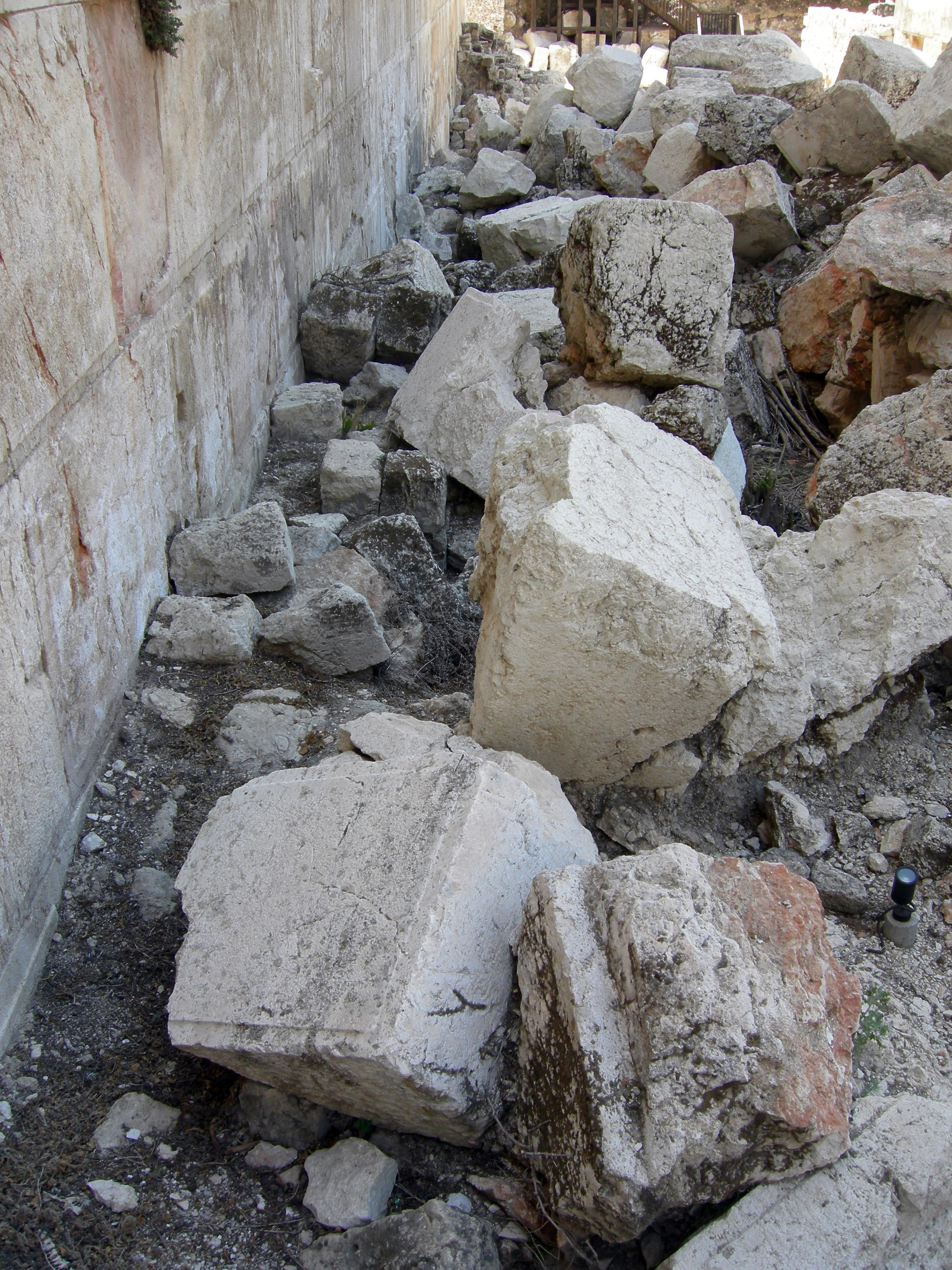
Stones from the Western Wall of the Temple Mount thrown during the Roman Siege of Jerusalem in 70 CE

=== Late Roman, Byzantine, and Early Muslim periods ===
The northern part of the city was rebuilt by the Emperor Hadrian around 130, under the name Aelia Capitolina. In the Byzantine period Jerusalem was extended southwards and again enclosed by city walls.

Muslims occupied Byzantine Jerusalem in the 7th century (637 CE) under the second caliph, `Umar Ibn al-Khattab who annexed it to the Islamic Arab Empire. He granted its inhabitants an assurance treaty. After the siege of Jerusalem, Sophronius welcomed `Umar, allegedly because, according to biblical prophecies known to the Church in Jerusalem, "a poor, but just and powerful man" would rise to be a protector and ally to the Christians of Jerusalem. Sophronius believed that `Umar, a great warrior who led an austere life, was a fulfillment of this prophecy. In the account by the Patriarch of Alexandria, Eutychius, it is said that `Umar paid a visit to the Church of the Holy Sepulchre and sat in its courtyard. When the time for prayer arrived, however, he left the church and prayed outside the compound, in order to avoid having future generations of Muslims use his prayer there as a pretext for converting the church into a mosque. Eutychius adds that `Umar also wrote a decree which he handed to the Patriarch, in which he prohibited Muslims gathering in prayer at the site. Caliph Umar and the subsequent Umayyad caliphs maintained generally cordial relations with the city's Christian communities and permitted Jews to resume annual pilgrimages to Jerusalem.

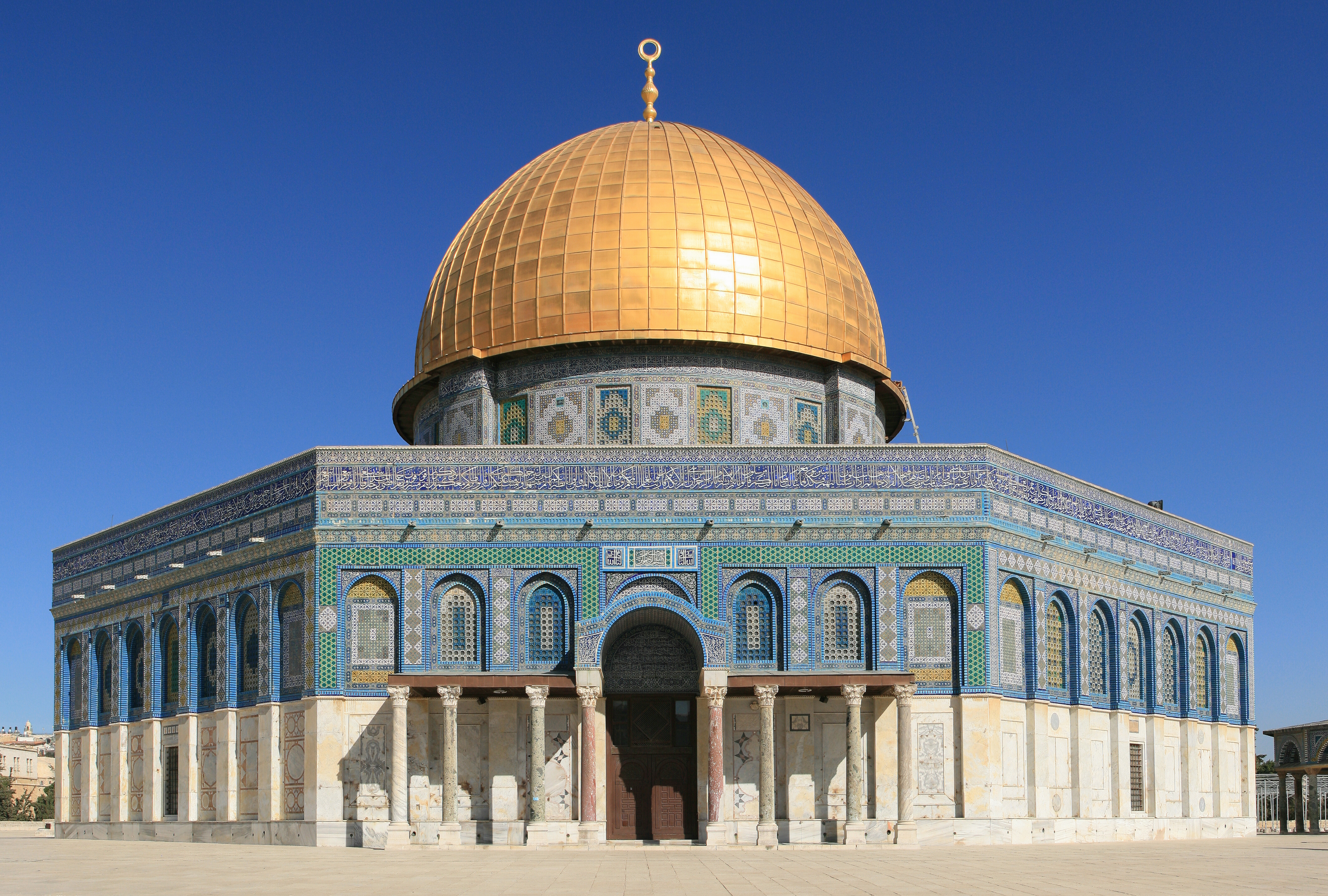
The Dome of the Rock (c. 685–692) built during the reign of Caliph Abd al-Malik

Because of the religious significance of Al-Masjid Al-Aqsa (Al-Aqsa Mosque Compound) in Islam, Caliph Umar ordered the construction of the first congregational mosque at the southern end of the mosque compound following the Muslim conquest of Jerusalem. This congregational mosque later became known as the Qibli Mosque, also referred to as Al-Aqsa Mosque. During the Umayyad period, Jerusalem acquired greater political importance, prompting the construction of numerous religious, administrative, and residential structures. The first Umayyad caliph, Muawiya (r. 661–680), chose Jerusalem as the site of his proclamation as caliph, reportedly at Al-Aqsa, and is traditionally credited with repairing or rebuilding the congregational Qibli Mosque. During the reign of Caliph Abd al-Malik (r. 685–705), the Dome of the Rock was constructed in the form that largely survives today. Abd al-Malik also initiated the second major reconstruction of the congregational Qibli (Al-Aqsa) Mosque, a project that was completed during the reign of his son and successor, Caliph al-Walid I (r. 705–715).

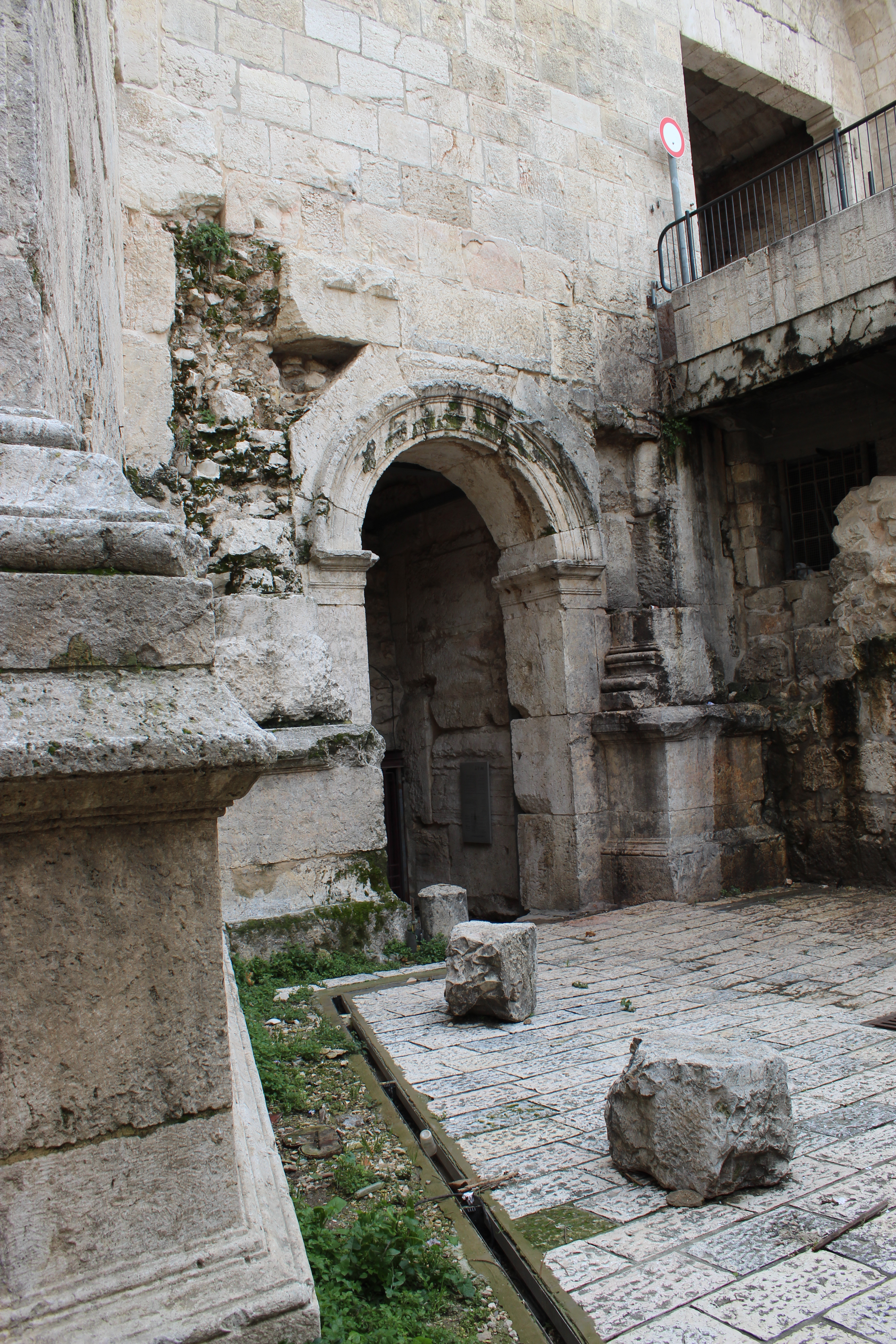
Remains of Late Roman-period gate under Damascus Gate

=== Crusader & Ayyubid periods ===
In 1099, Jerusalem was captured by the Western Christian army of the First Crusade and it remained in their hands until recaptured by the Arab Muslims, led by Saladin, on October 2, 1187. He summoned the Jews and permitted them to resettle in the city. In 1219, the walls of the city were razed by Sultan Al-Mu'azzam of Damascus; in 1229, by treaty with Egypt, Jerusalem came into the hands of Frederick II of Germany. In 1239 he began to rebuild the walls, but they were demolished again by Da'ud, the emir of Kerak. In 1243, Jerusalem came again under the control of the Christians, and the walls were repaired. The Khwarazmian Turks took the city in 1244 and Sultan Malik al-Muazzam razed the walls, rendering it again defenseless and dealing a heavy blow to the city's status.

=== Mamluk & Ottoman periods ===
During the Mamluk period (1250–1517), numerous structures were erected in the city, especially within and around the Al-Aqsa Mosque compound, including madrasas, sabils, and other religious and charitable buildings, particularly along its western and northern walls. The Al-Aqsa Mosque Compound underwent major restoration campaigns under Sultan al-Nasir Muhammad and later under Sultan Qaitbay, both of whom sponsored extensive renovations. Most of the mosque's existing minarets also date from this period.

Ordnance Survey of Jerusalem (1865)

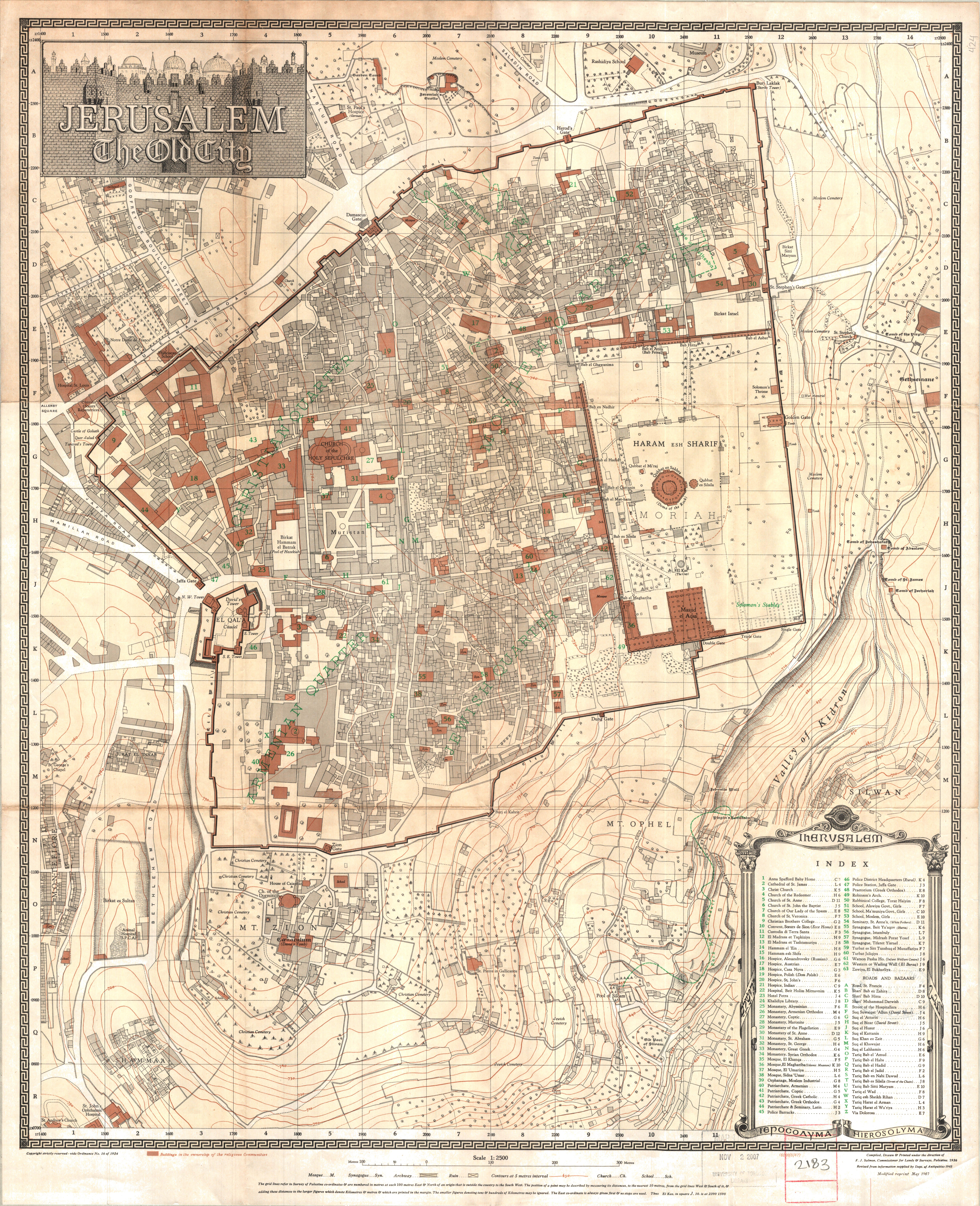
Survey of Palestine (1936)

The cartography of the Old City of Jerusalem culminated in these two detailed British maps, showing the city as it stood in the mid-19th and mid-20th centuries.

The current walls of the Old City were built in 1535–42 by the Ottoman Turkish sultan Suleiman the Magnificent. The walls stretch for approximately 4.5 km (2.8 miles), and rise to a height of between 5 and 15 metres (16.4–49 ft), with a thickness of 3 metres (10 feet) at the base of the wall. Altogether, the Old City walls contain 35 towers, of which 15 are concentrated in the more exposed northern wall. Suleiman's wall had six gates, to which a seventh, the New Gate, was added in 1887; several other, older gates, have been walled up over the centuries. The Golden Gate was at first rebuilt and left open by Suleiman's architects, only to be walled up a short while later. The New Gate was opened in the wall surrounding the Christian Quarter during the 19th century. Two secondary gates were reopened in recent times on the southeastern side of the city walls as a result of archaeological work.

== UNESCO status ==
In 1980, Jordan proposed that the Old City be listed as a UNESCO World Heritage Site. It was added to the List in 1981. In 1982, Jordan requested that it be added to the List of World Heritage in Danger. The United States government opposed the request, noting that the Jordanian government had no standing to make such a nomination and that the consent of the Israeli government would be required since it effectively controlled Jerusalem. In 2011, UNESCO issued a statement reiterating its view that East Jerusalem is "part of the occupied Palestinian territory, and that the status of Jerusalem must be resolved in permanent status negotiations."

== Archaeology ==
=== Israelite period ===
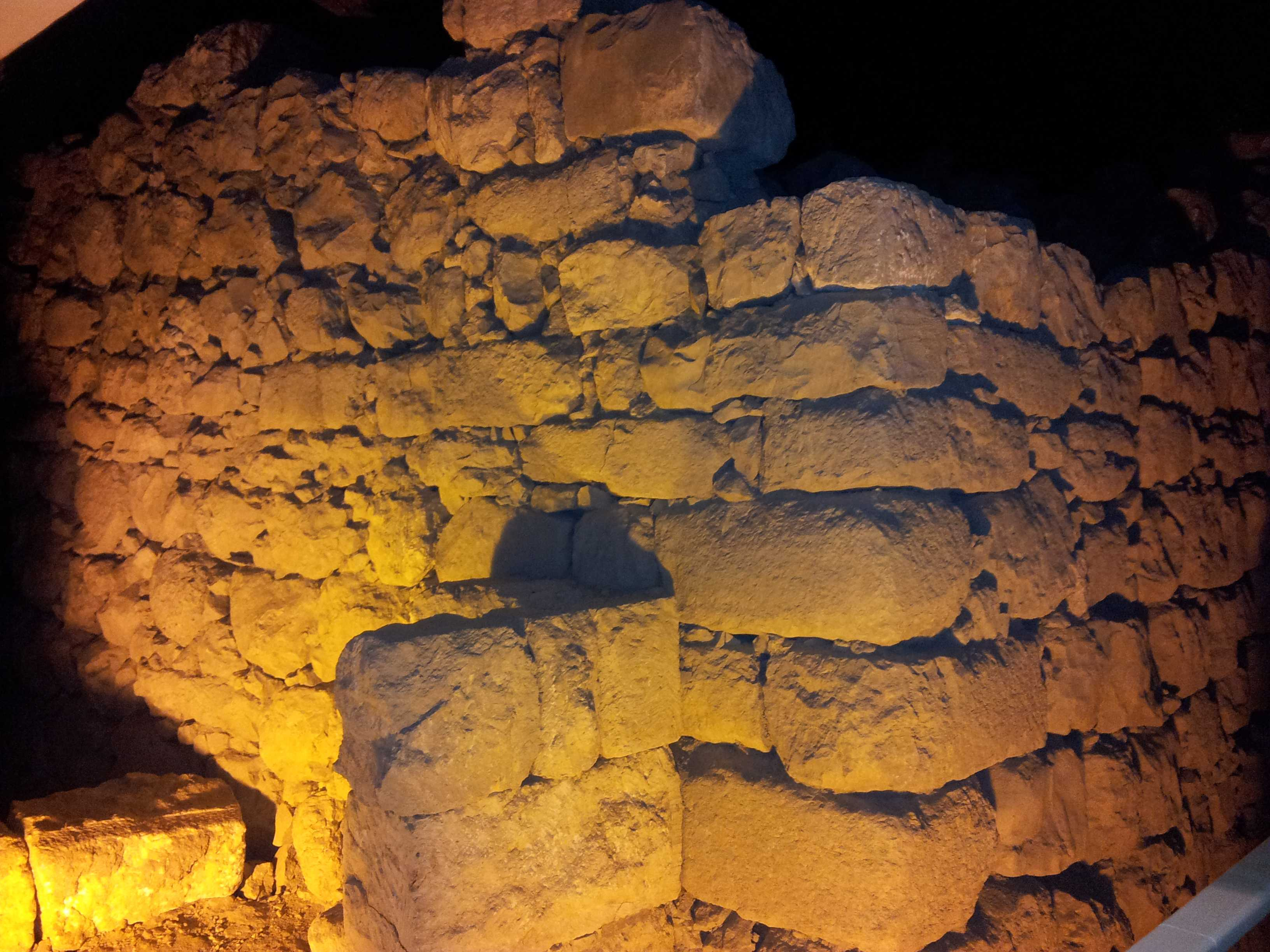
The Israelite Tower dating back to the Iron Age

Among the Israelite period finds in the Old City are two portions of the 8th and 7th century BCE city walls, in the area of the Israelite Tower, probably including parts of a gate where numerous projectiles were found, attesting to the Babylonian sack of Jerusalem in 586 BCE. Another part of the late 8th-century BCE fortification discovered was dubbed the "broad wall", after the way it was described in the Book of Nehemiah, built to defend Jerusalem against the Assyrian siege of Jerusalem of 701 BCE.

=== Hellenistic period ===
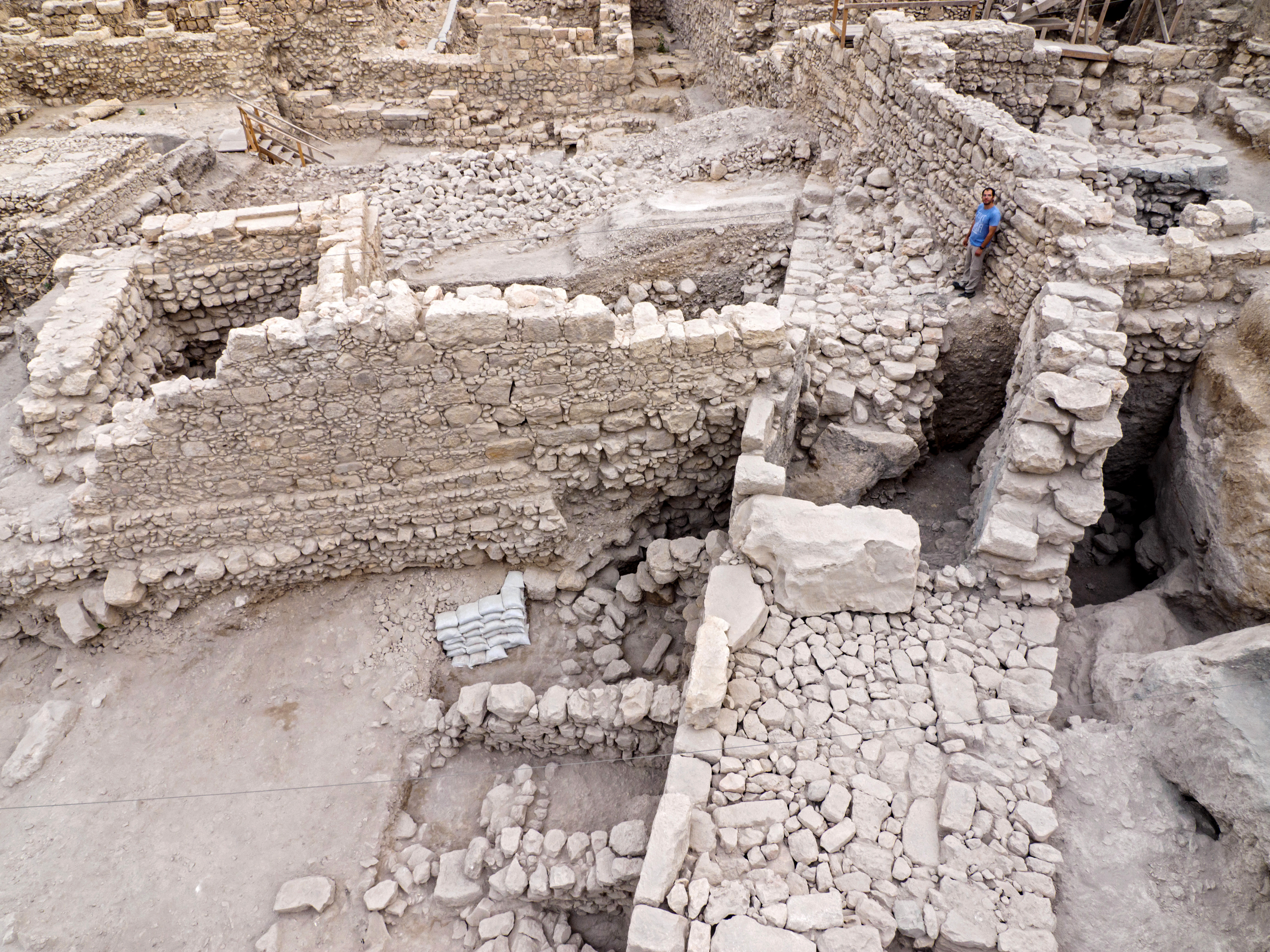
Possible remains of the Acra fortress

In 2015, archaeologists uncovered the remnants of an impressive fort, built by Greeks in the center of old Jerusalem. It is believed that it is the remnants of the Acra fortress. The team also found coins that date from the time of Antiochus IV to the time of Antiochus VII. In addition, they found Greek arrowheads, slingshots, ballistic stones and amphorae.

In 2018, archaeologists discovered a 4-centimeter-long filigree gold earring with a ram's head around 200 meters south of the Temple Mount. The Israel Antiquities Authority said it was consistent with jewelry from the early Hellenistic period (3rd or early 2nd century BCE). Adding that it was the first time somebody finds a golden earring from the Hellenistic times in Jerusalem.

=== Herodian period ===
Many structures dated to the Herodian period were discovered in the Jewish Quarter during archaeological excavations carried out between 1967 and 1983. Among them was unearthed a palatial mansion from the Herodian period, believed to be the residence of Annas the High Priest. In its vicinity, a depiction of the Temple menorah was discovered, carved while its model still stood in the Temple, engraved in a plastered wall. The palace has been destroyed during the final days of the Roman siege of 70 CE, suffering the same fate as the so-called Burnt House, a building belonging to the Kathros priestly family, which was found nearby.

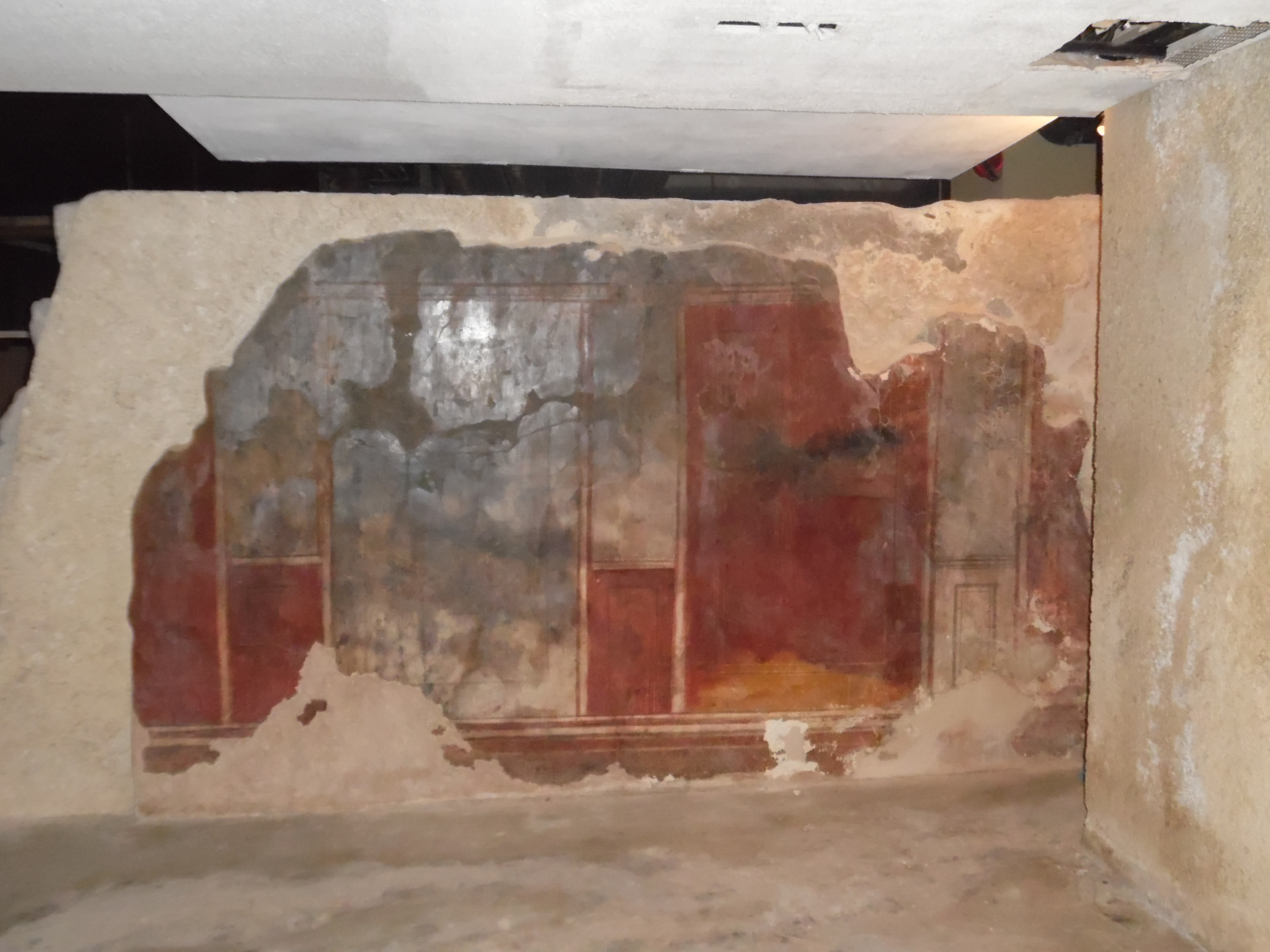
Fresco showing signs of burning, dating to the time of the destruction of the Second Temple, Wohl Archaeological Museum

In 1968, the Trumpeting Place inscription was found at the southwest corner of Temple Mount, and is believed to mark the site where the priests used to declare the advent of Shabbat and other Jewish holidays.

=== Byzantine period ===
In the 1970s, while excavating the remains of the Nea Church (the New Church of the Theotokos), a Greek inscription was found. It reads: "This work too was donated by our most pious Emperor Flavius Justinian, through the provision and care of Constantine, most saintly priest and abbot, in the 13th year of the indiction." A second dedicatory inscription bearing the names of Emperor Justinian and of the same abbot of the Nea Church was discovered in 2017 among the ruins of a pilgrim hostel about a kilometre north of Damascus Gate, which proves the importance of the Nea complex at the time.

=== Umayyad period ===
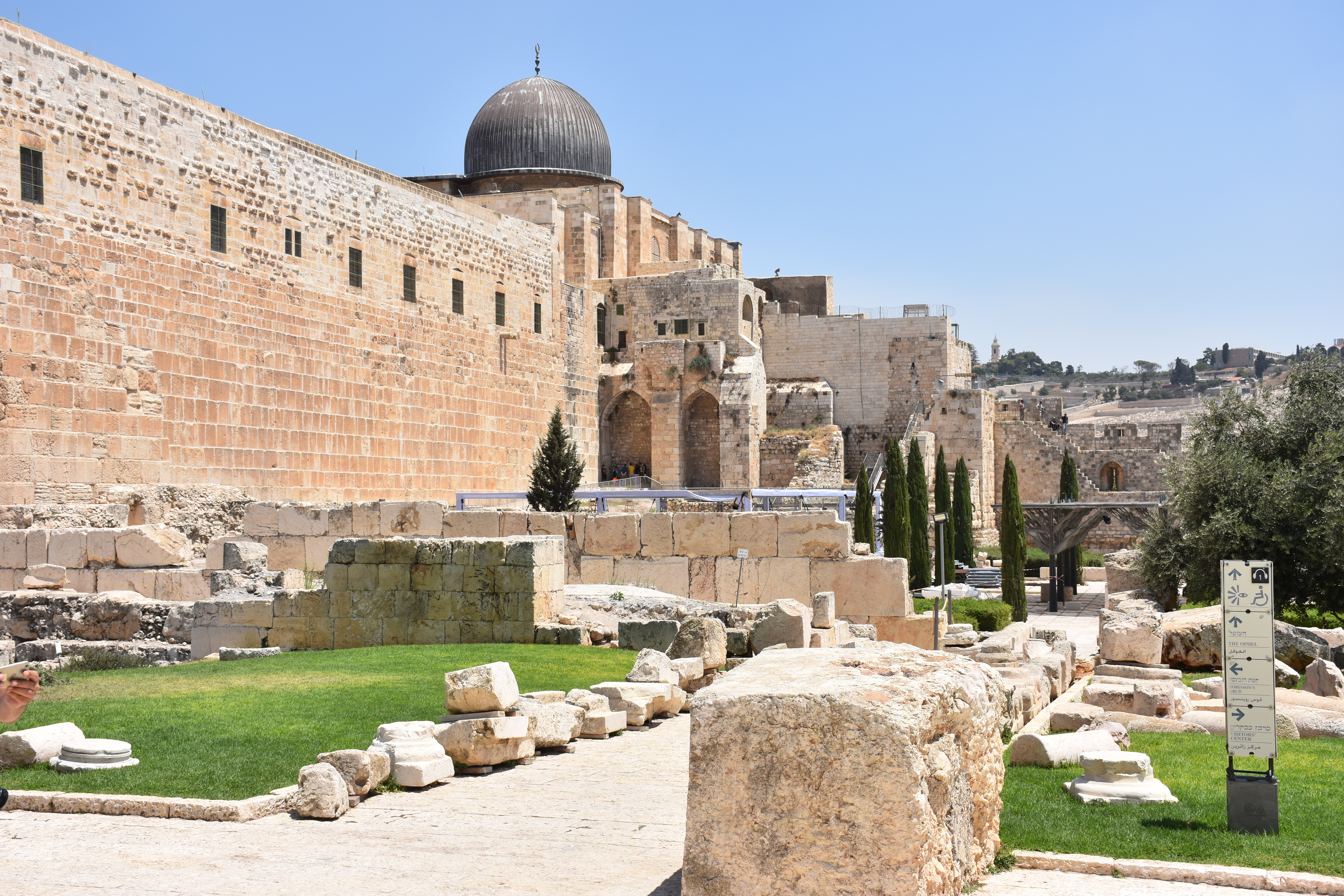
Entrance leading to the Umayyad Palace Garden, with the dome of the Qibli (Al-Aqsa) Mosque visible in the background, 2018

During a ten-year archaeological excavation of the southern area adjacent to the Al-Aqsa Mosque Compound, archaeologists uncovered a complex of Umayyad palaces. The buildings share a characteristic quadrangular plan centered on an open courtyard surrounded by four riwaqs (arcades). One of the principal structures has been identified as the Dar al-Imara (Governor's Palace), the administrative residence of the provincial governor. The palace complex foundations were found beneath the 16th-century city walls reconstructed by Sultan Suleiman the Magnificent, indicating that Jerusalem's early Islamic city walls extended beyond the line of the present-day Ottoman-era city walls.

== Quarters ==
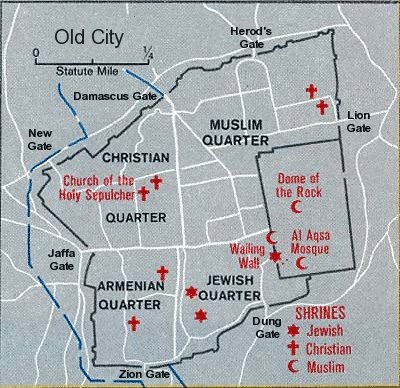
Map of the Old City's modern quarters

The Old City is currently divided into four uneven quarters: the Muslim Quarter, the Christian Quarter, the Armenian Quarter and the Jewish Quarter. Matthew Teller writes that this four-quarter convention may have originated in the 1841 British Royal Engineers map of Jerusalem, or at least Reverend George Williams' subsequent labelling of it. A fifth quarter, the Mughrabi Quarter, was demolished following the Six-Day War.

This 19th-century cartographic partition into four quarters represented the historical development of the city that had previously been divided into many more harat (Arabic: حارَة, romanized: Hārat: "quarters", "neighborhoods", "districts" or "areas", see wikt:حارة); the Christian and Jewish areas of the city had grown considerably over the preceding centuries.

Despite the names, there was no governing principle of ethnic segregation: 30 percent of the houses in the Muslim quarter were rented out to Jews, and 70 percent of the Armenian quarter. The 1905 census by the Ottoman authorities found mixed populations in the quarters of Jerusalem, for instance, it counted 388 Jewish family heads and 383 Muslim family heads living on al-Wad Street, according to historian Vincent Lemire, this reflects a broader pattern of lack of ethnoreligious homogeniety in the quarters of the old city at the time.

Below is a table of the historically recorded quarters of the city, from 1495 up until the modern system:

	Local divisions				Western divisions	
Date	1495	1500s	1800s	1900	1840s onwards	
Source	Mujir al-Din	Ottoman census	Traditional system	Ottoman census	Modern maps	
Quarters	Ghuriyya (Turiyya)		Bab el-Asbat		Muslim Quarter (north)	North-east
Quarters	Bab Hutta	Bab Hutta	Bab Hutta	Bab Hutta	Muslim Quarter (north)	North-east
Quarters	Masharqa				Muslim Quarter (north)	North-east
Quarters	Bani Zayd	Bani Zayd	Sa'diyya	Sa'diyya	Muslim Quarter (north)	North-west
Quarters	Bab el-'Amud	Bab el-'Amud	Bab el-'Amud	Bab el-'Amud	Muslim Quarter (north)	North-west
Quarters	Bani Murra	Bab el-'Amud	Bab el-'Amud	Bab el-'Amud	Muslim Quarter (north)	North-west
Quarters	Zara'na	Dara'na	Haddadin	Nasara	Christian Quarter	North
Quarters			Khan ez-Zeyt	Nasara	Christian Quarter	East
Quarters	Nasara ("Christian")		Nasara	Nasara	Christian Quarter	Middle and south
Quarters	Nasara ("Christian")		Mawarna	Nasara	Christian Quarter	Middle and south
Quarters	Jawalda		Jawalda	Nasara	Christian Quarter	West
Quarters	Bani Harith	Bani Harith	Jawa'na	Sharaf	Armenian Quarter	West
Quarters	Dawiyya	Bani Harith	Jawa'na	Sharaf	Armenian Quarter	North
Quarters	Arman ("Armenian")	Sihyun	Arman	Sharaf	Armenian Quarter	South
Quarters	Yahud ("Jewish")	Sihyun	Yahud			East
Quarters	Yahud ("Jewish")	Risha	Yahud	Silsila	Jewish Quarter	South
Quarters	Yahud ("Jewish")	Maslakh	Yahud	Silsila	Jewish Quarter	South
Quarters	Saltin	Khawaldi	Yahud	Silsila	Jewish Quarter	South
Quarters	Sharaf	Sharaf (Alam)	Yahud	Silsila	Jewish Quarter	South
Quarters	'Alam	Sharaf (Alam)	Yahud	Silsila	Jewish Quarter	North
Quarters	Magharba ("Moroccan / Maghrebi")	Magharba	Magharba	Silsila	Jewish Quarter	East
Quarters	Marzaban	Bab el-Qattanin	Bab es-Silsila	Wad	Muslim Quarter (south)	South
Quarters	Marzaban	Bab el-Qattanin	Qattanin	Wad	Muslim Quarter (south)	South
Quarters	Marzaban	Aqabet es-Sitta	Wad	Wad	Muslim Quarter (south)	South
Quarters	Marzaban	Aqabet es-Sitta	'Aqabet et-Takiya	Wad	Muslim Quarter (south)	South
Quarters	(Outside the city walls)			Nebi Daud		Mount Zion

=== Muslim Quarter ===
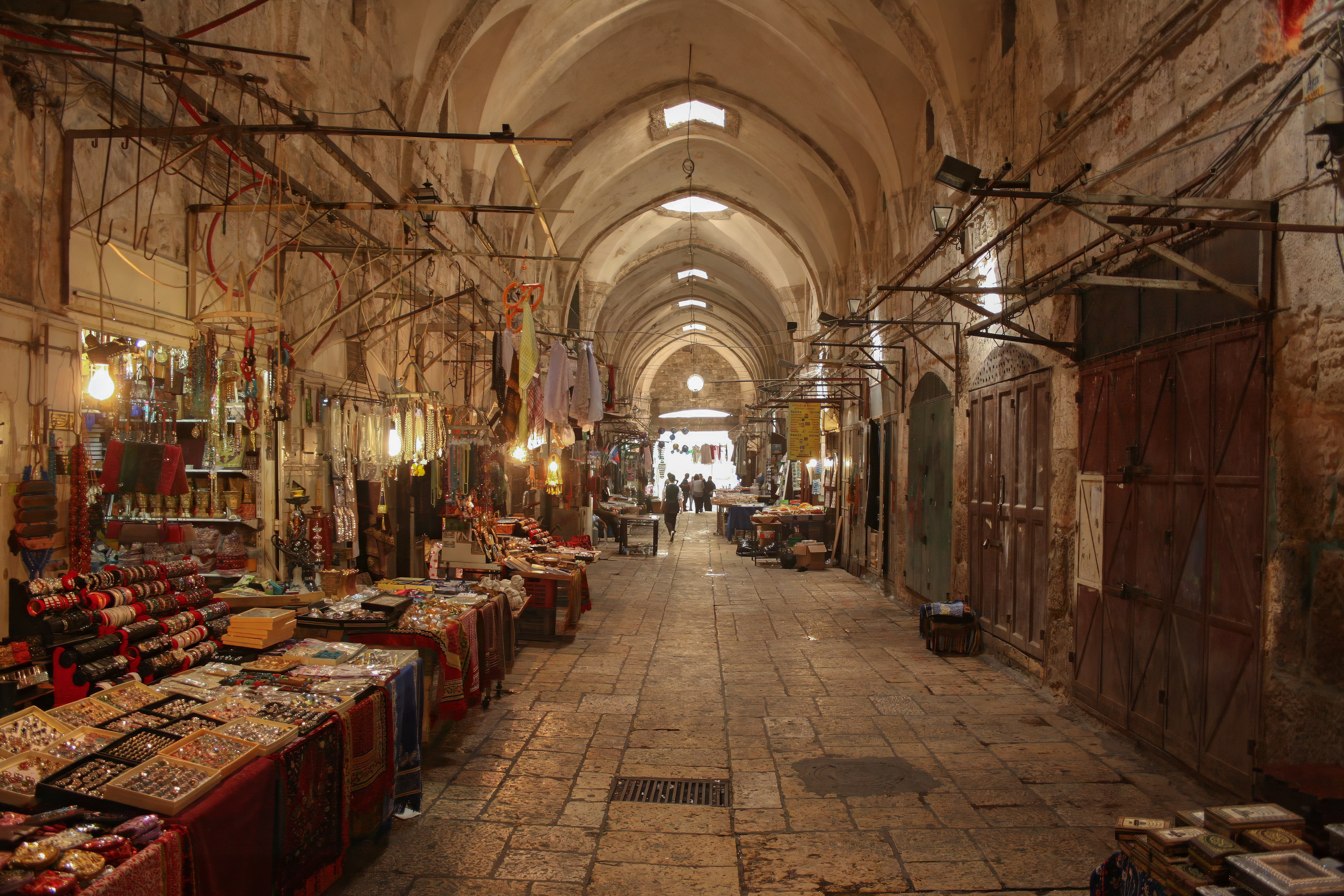
Cotton Merchants' Market

The Muslim Quarter (Arabic: حارَة المُسلِمين, Hārat al-Muslimīn) is the largest and most populous of the four quarters and is situated in the northeastern corner of the Old City, extending from the Lions' Gate in the east, along the northern wall of the Temple Mount in the south, to the Western Wall – Damascus Gate route in the west. During the British Mandate, Sir Ronald Storrs embarked on a project to rehabilitate the Cotton Merchants' Market, which was badly neglected under the Turks. He describes it as a public latrine with piles of debris up to five feet high. With the help of the Pro-Jerusalem Society, vaults, roofing and walls were restored, and looms were brought in to provide employment.

Like the other three quarters of the Old City, until the riots of 1929 the Muslim quarter had a mixed population of Muslims, Christians, and also Jews. Today, there are "many Israeli settler homes" and "several yeshivas", including Yeshivat Ateret Yerushalayim, in the Muslim Quarter. Its population was 21,850 in 2020.

=== Christian Quarter ===
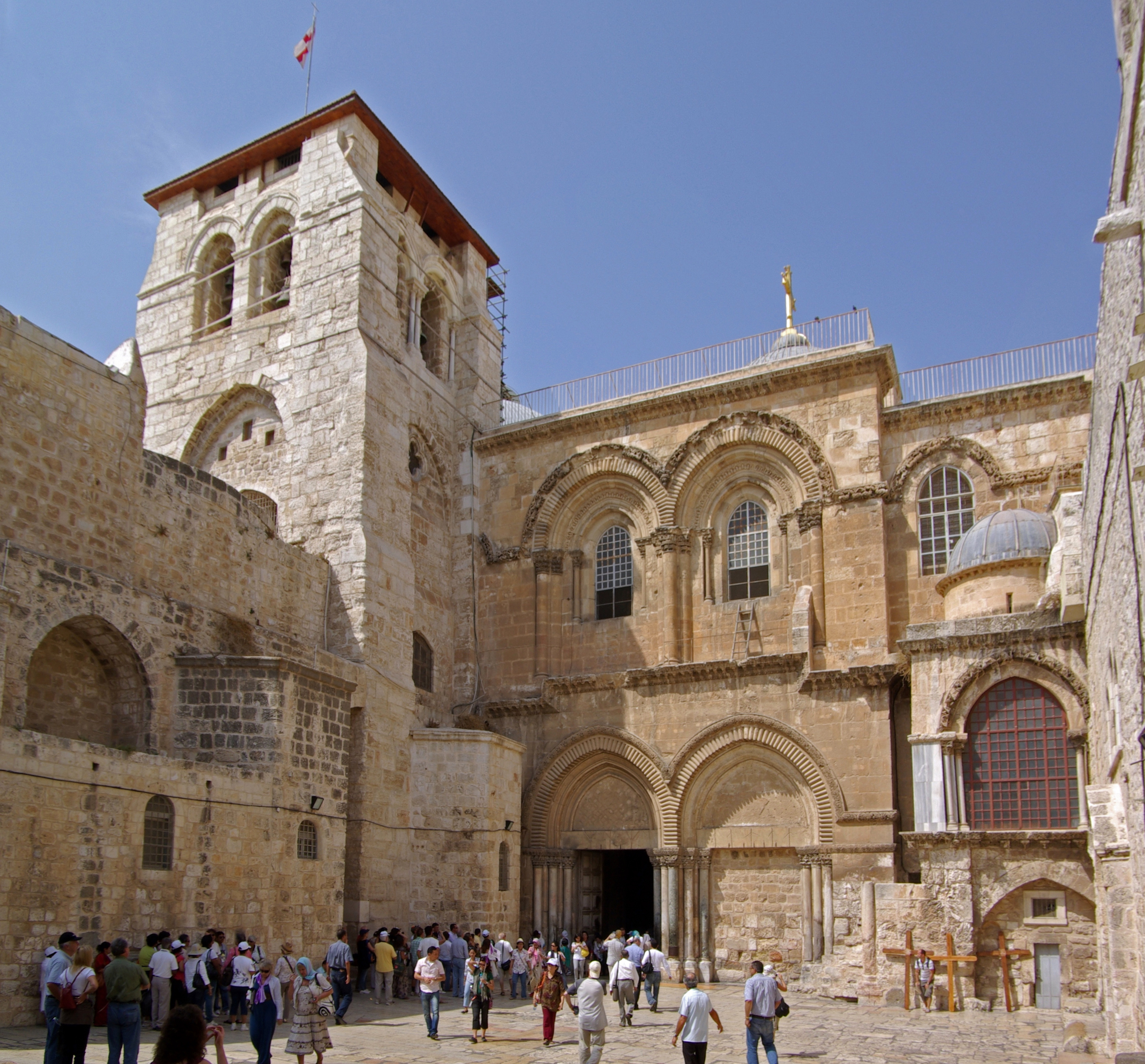
Church of the Holy Sepulchre

The Christian Quarter (Arabic: حارة النصارى, Ḩārat an-Naşāra) is situated in the northwestern corner of the Old City, extending from the New Gate in the north, along the western wall of the Old City as far as the Jaffa Gate, along the Jaffa Gate – Western Wall route in the south, bordering the Jewish and Armenian Quarters, as far as the Damascus Gate in the east, where it borders the Muslim Quarter. The quarter contains the Church of the Holy Sepulchre, viewed by many as Christianity's holiest place. Its population was 3,870 in 2020.

=== Armenian Quarter ===
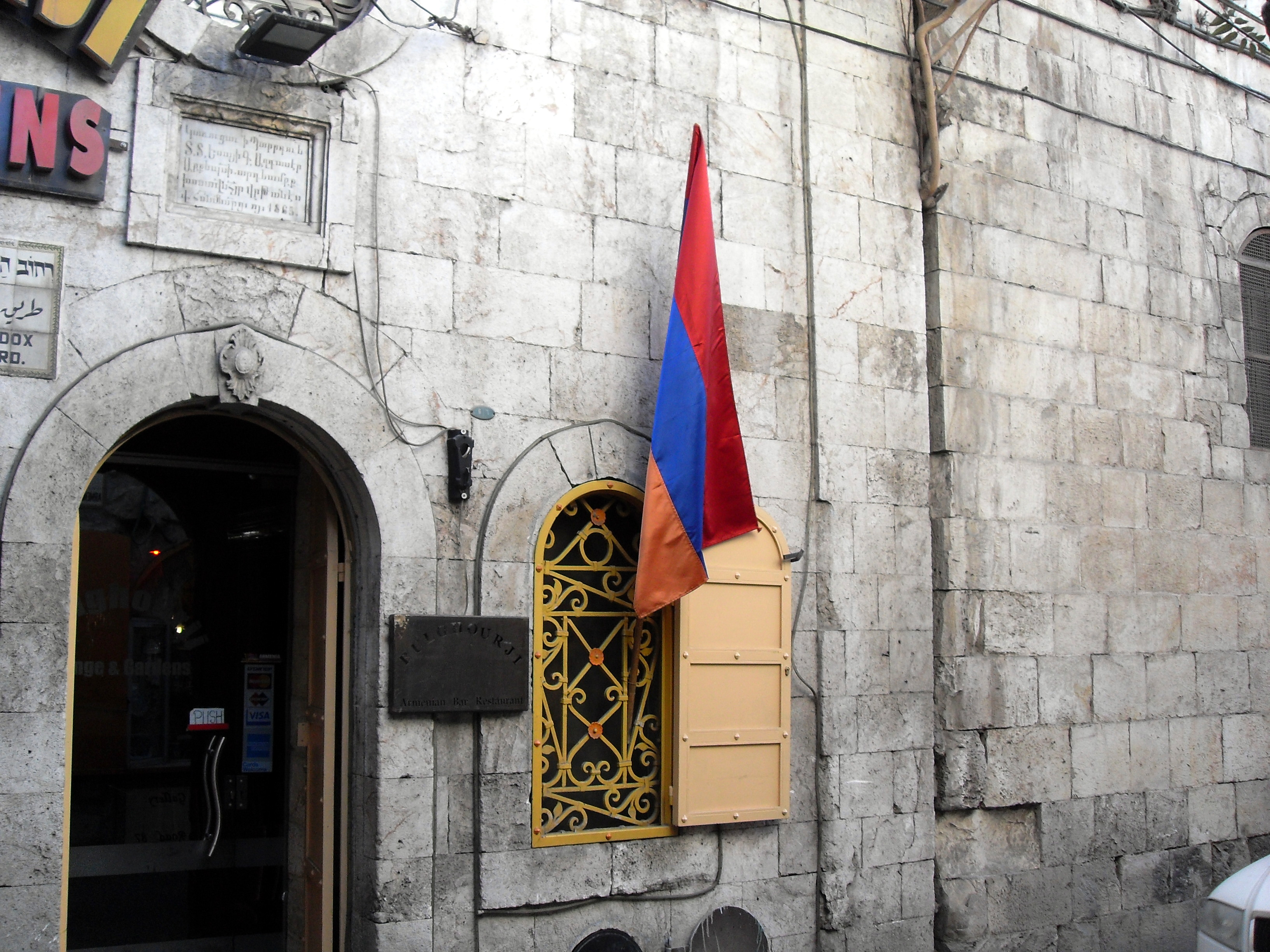
Armenian flag in the Armenian Quarter

The Armenian Quarter (Armenian: Հայկական Թաղամաս, Haygagan T'aġamas, Arabic: حارة الأرمن, Ḩārat al-Arman) is the smallest of the four quarters of the Old City. Although the Armenians are Christian, the Armenian Quarter is distinct from the Christian Quarter. Despite the small size and population of this quarter, the Armenians and their Patriarchate remain staunchly independent and form a vigorous presence in the Old City. After the 1948 Arab–Israeli War, the four quarters of the city came under Jordanian control. According to a 2007 study, the quarter housed 2,424 people (6.55% of Old City's total). Its population was 2,160 in 2020.

=== Jewish Quarter ===
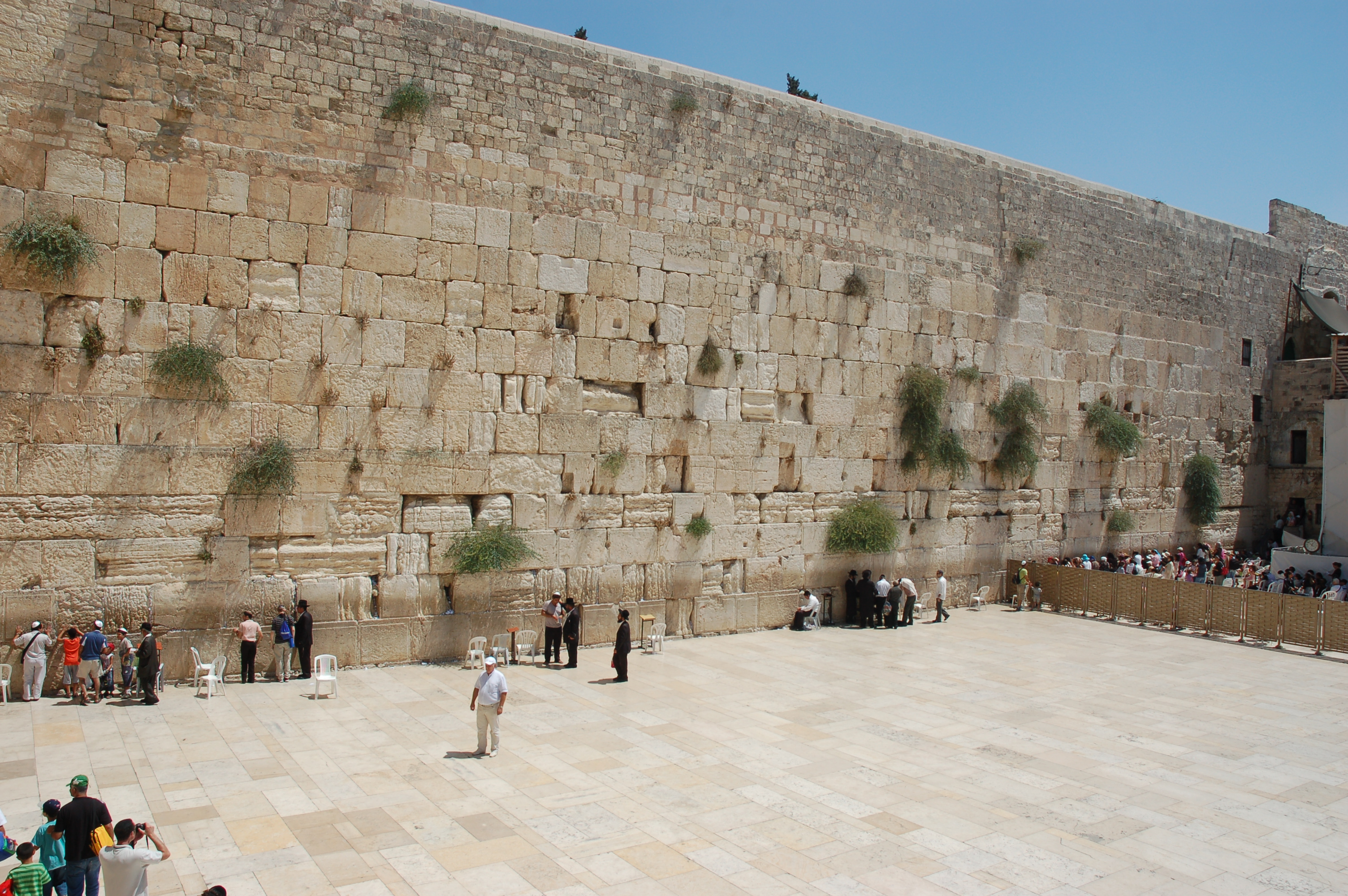
The Western Wall and Western Wall Plaza

The Jewish Quarter (Hebrew: הרובע היהודי, HaRova HaYehudi, known colloquially to residents as HaRova, Arabic: حارة اليهود, Ḩārat al-Yahūd) lies in the southeastern sector of the walled city, and stretches from the Zion Gate in the south, bordering the Armenian Quarter on the west, along the Cardo to Chain Street in the north and extends east to the Western Wall and the Temple Mount. The quarter has a rich history, with several long periods of Jewish presence covering much of the time since the eighth century BCE. In 1948, its population of about 2,000 Jews was besieged, and forced to leave en masse. The quarter was completely bombed during the Battle for Jerusalem.

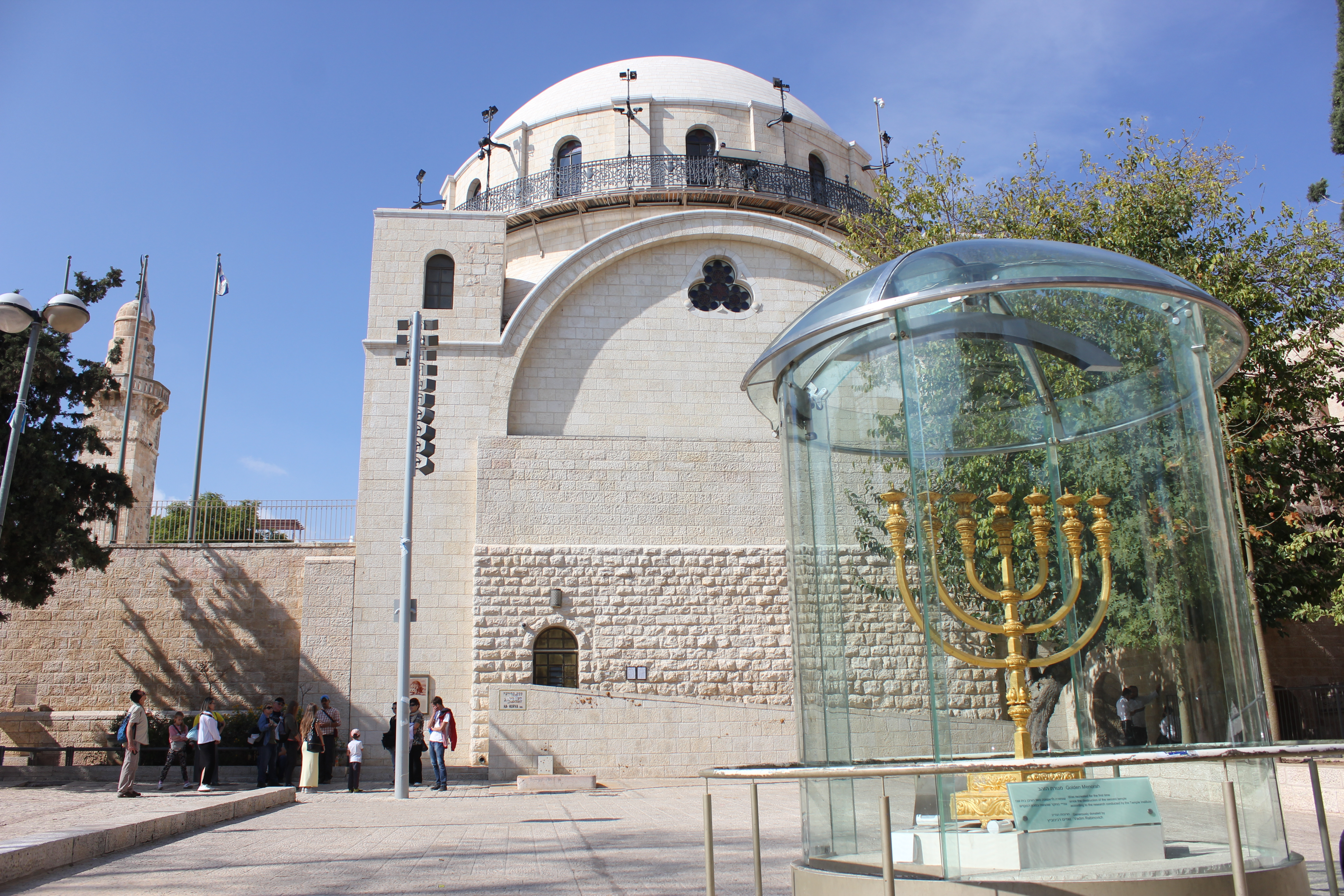
Hurva Synagogue

The Jewish quarter remained under Jordanian control until its recapture by Israeli paratroopers in the Six-Day War of 1967. A few days later, Israeli authorities ordered the demolition of the adjacent Moroccan Quarter, forcibly relocating all of its inhabitants, in order to facilitate public access to the Western Wall. 195 properties – synagogues, yeshivas, and apartments – were registered as Jewish and fell under the control of Jordan's Custodian of Enemy Property. Most were occupied by Palestinian refugees expelled by Israeli forces from West Jerusalem and its contiguous villages until UNRWA and Jordan constructed the Shuafat Refugee Camp, where many were shifted, leaving most of the properties empty of inhabitants.

In 1968, after the Six Day War, Israel confiscated 12%, including the Jewish quarter and contiguous areas, of the Old City for public use. Some 80% of this confiscated infrastructure consisted of properties not owned by Jews. After reconstruction the parts of the quarter destroyed prior to 1967, these properties were then offered for sale exclusively to the Israeli and Jewish public. The prior owners mostly refused compensation, often because their properties were part of Islamic or family waqfs, which cannot be put up for sale. As of 2005, the population stood at 2,348. Many large educational institutions have taken up residence. Before being rebuilt, the quarter was carefully excavated under the supervision of Hebrew University archaeologist Nahman Avigad. The archaeological remains are on display in a series of museums and outdoor parks, which tourists can visit by descending two or three stories beneath the level of the current city.

Its population was 3,240 in 2020.

=== Mughrabi Quarter ===
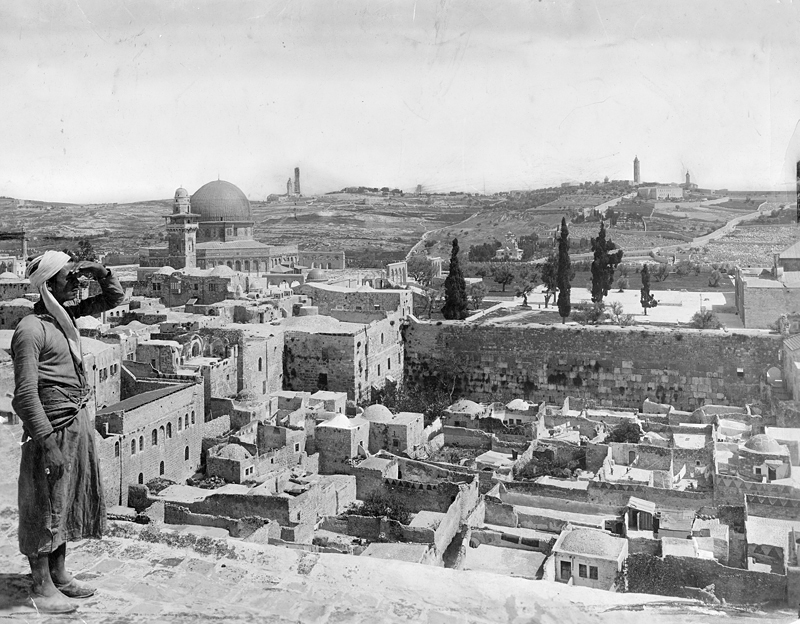
The now demolished Moroccan quarter in 1917

There was previously a small Mughrabi Quarter in the Old City. Within a week of the Six-Day War's end, the quarter was largely destroyed in order to give visitors better access to the Western Wall by creating the Western Wall Plaza. The parts of the quarter that were not destroyed are now part of the Jewish Quarter. Simultaneously with the demolition, a new regulation was set into place by which the only access point for non-Muslims to the Temple Mount is through the Gate of the Moors, which is reached via the so-called Mughrabi Bridge.

== Gates ==
During different periods, the city walls followed different outlines and had a varying number of gates. During the era of the crusader Kingdom of Jerusalem for instance, Jerusalem had four gates, one on each side. The current walls were built by Suleiman the Magnificent, who provided them with six gates; several older gates, which had been walled up before the arrival of the Ottomans, were left as they were. As to the previously sealed Golden Gate, Suleiman at first opened and rebuilt it, but then walled it up again as well. The number of operational gates was brought back to seven after the addition of the New Gate in 1887; a smaller one, popularly known as the Tanners' Gate, has been opened for visitors after being discovered and unsealed during excavations in the 1990s. The sealed historic gates comprise four that are at least partially preserved (the double Golden Gate in the eastern wall, and the Single, Triple, and Double Gates in the southern wall), with several other gates discovered by archaeologists of which only traces remain (the Gate of the Essenes on Mount Zion, the gate of Herod's royal palace south of the citadel, and the vague remains of what 19th-century explorers identified as the Gate of the Funerals (Bab al-Jana'iz) or of al-Buraq (Bab al-Buraq) south of the Golden Gate).

Until 1887, each gate was closed before sunset and opened at sunrise. These gates have been known by a variety of names used in different historical periods and by different communities.

== Gallery ==
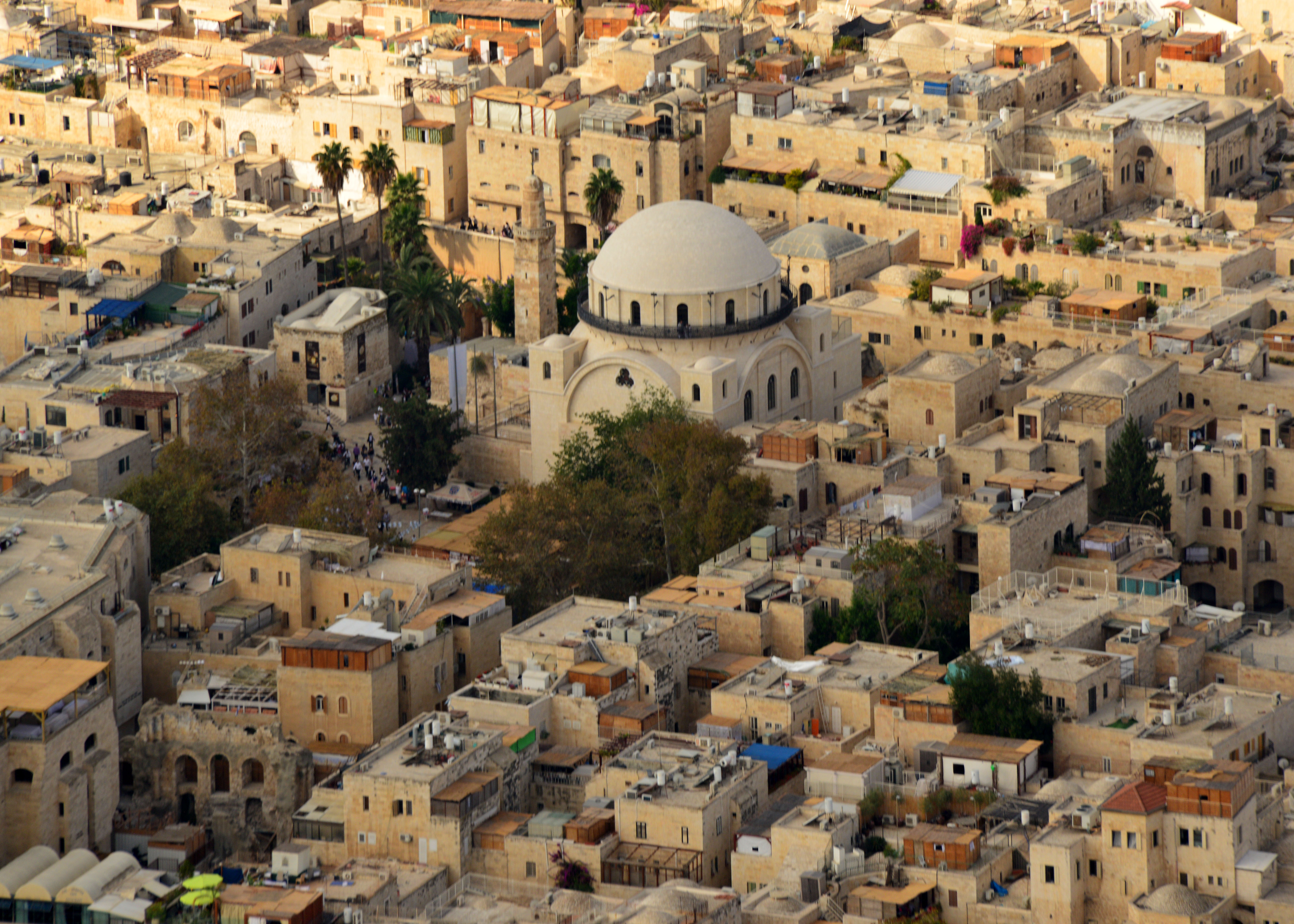
Jewish Quarter

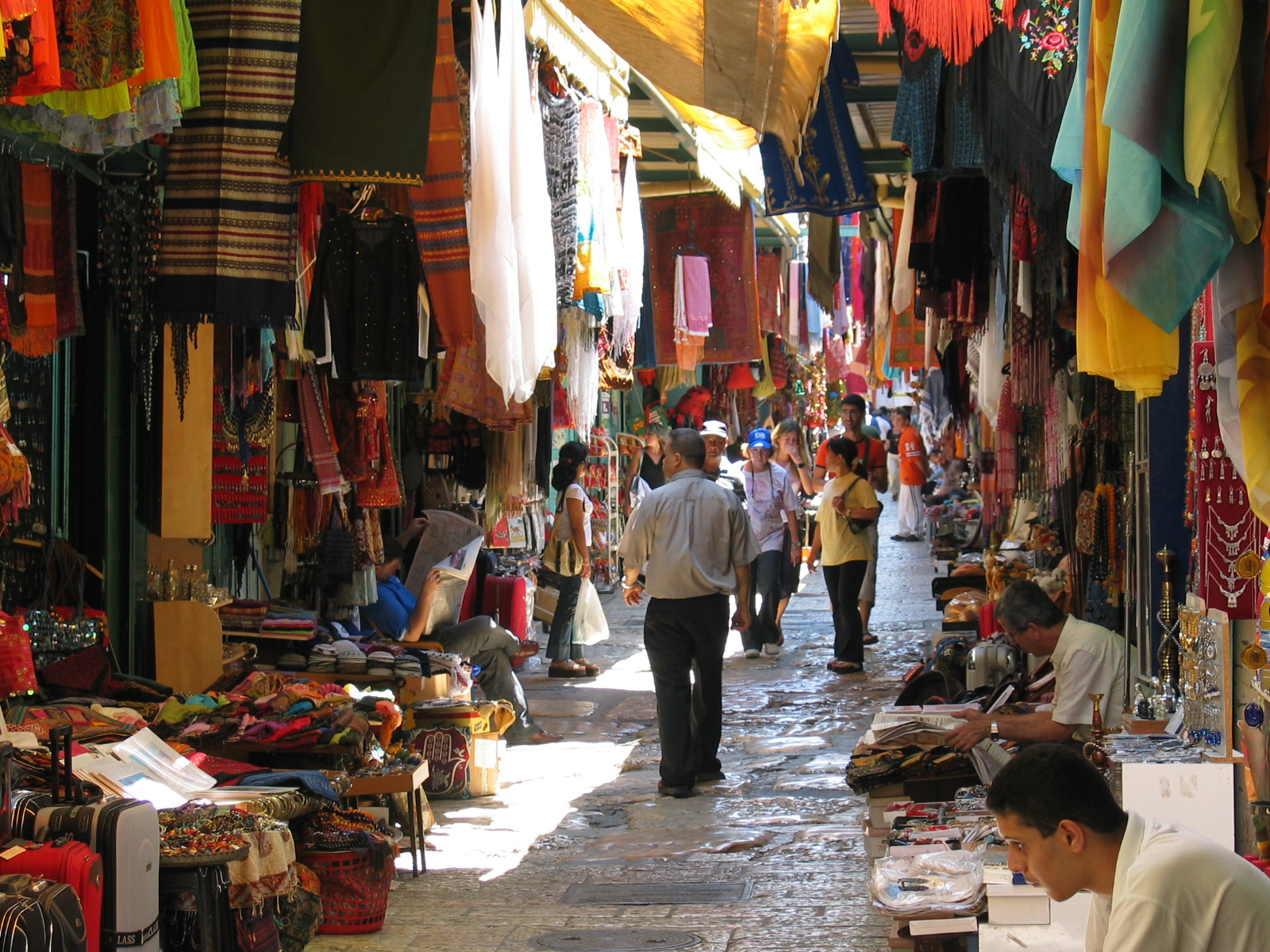
Street bazaar (souq), Christian Quarter Road (2006)

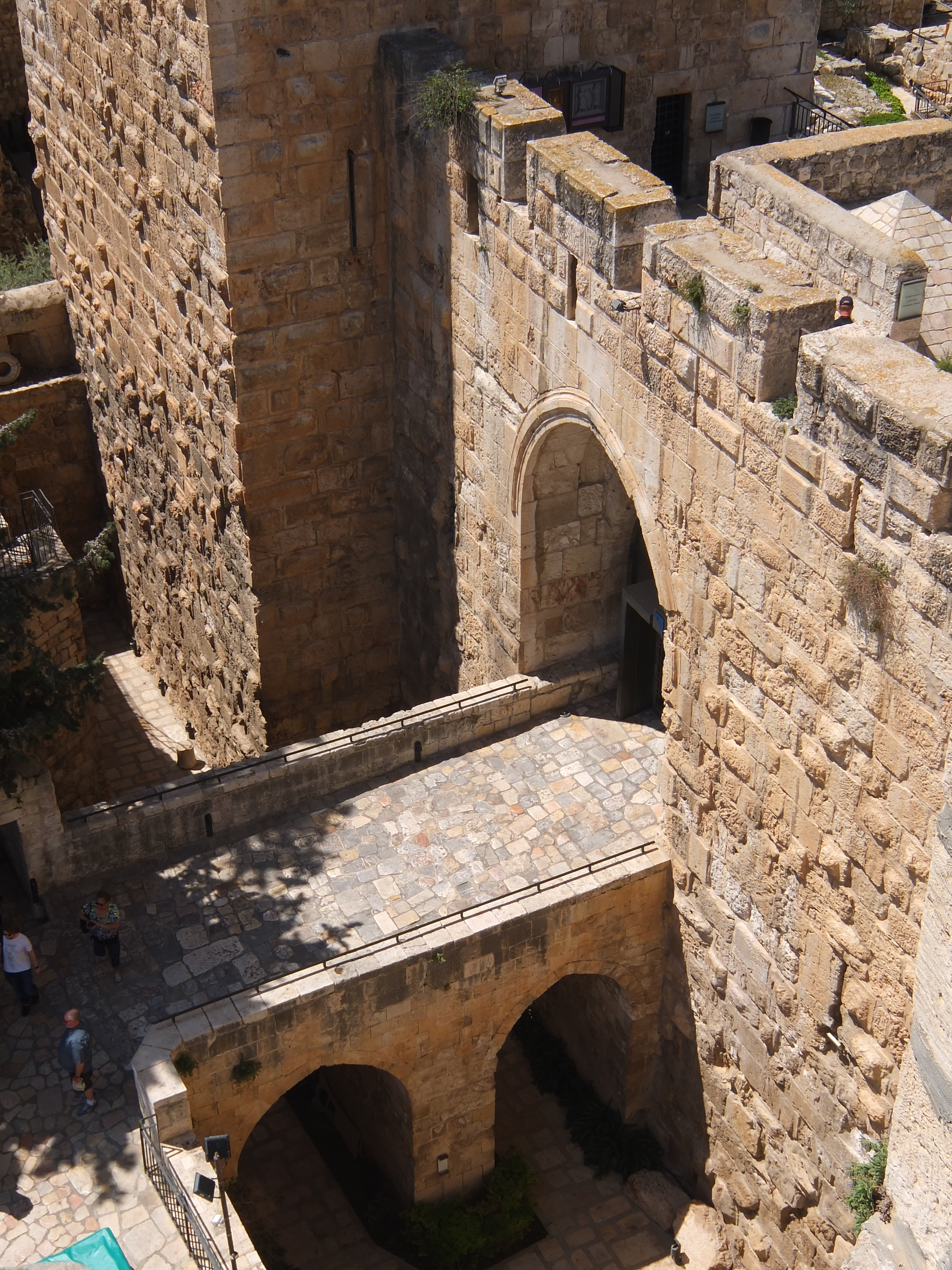
Entrance to the citadel, popularly known as the Tower of David

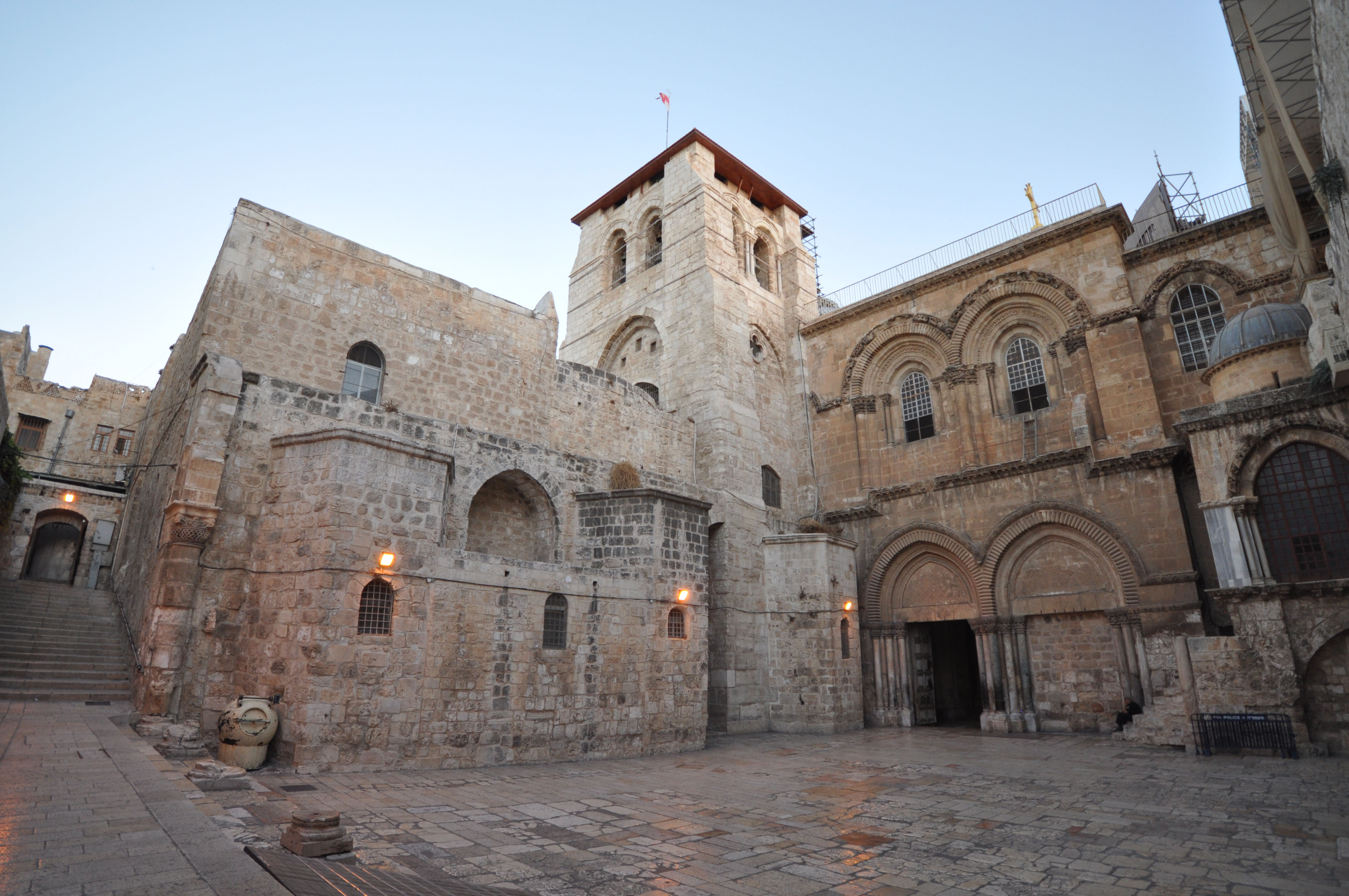
Church of the Holy Sepulchre

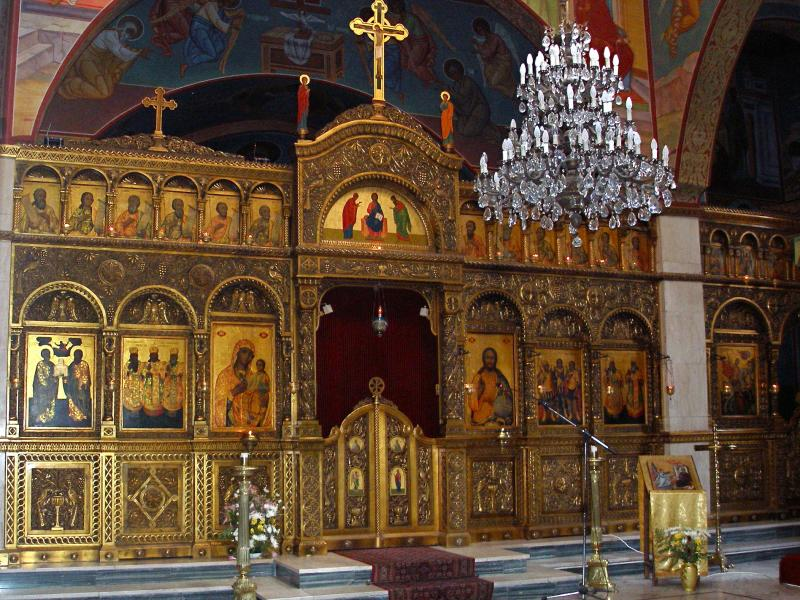
Cathedral of Our Lady of the Annunciation, Jerusalem

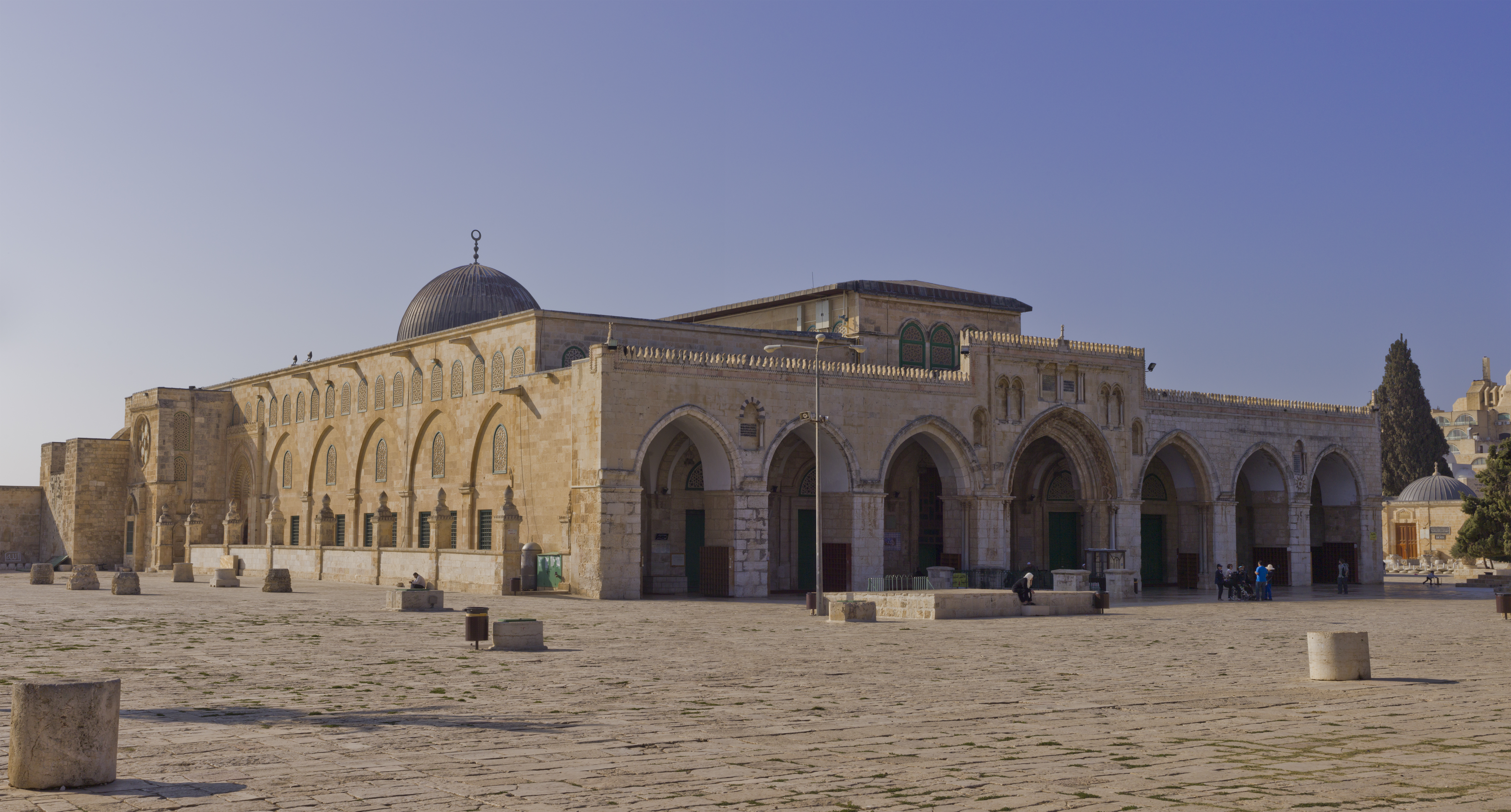
The Qibli (Al-Aqsa) Mosque located on the southern side of Al-Aqsa Mosque Compound

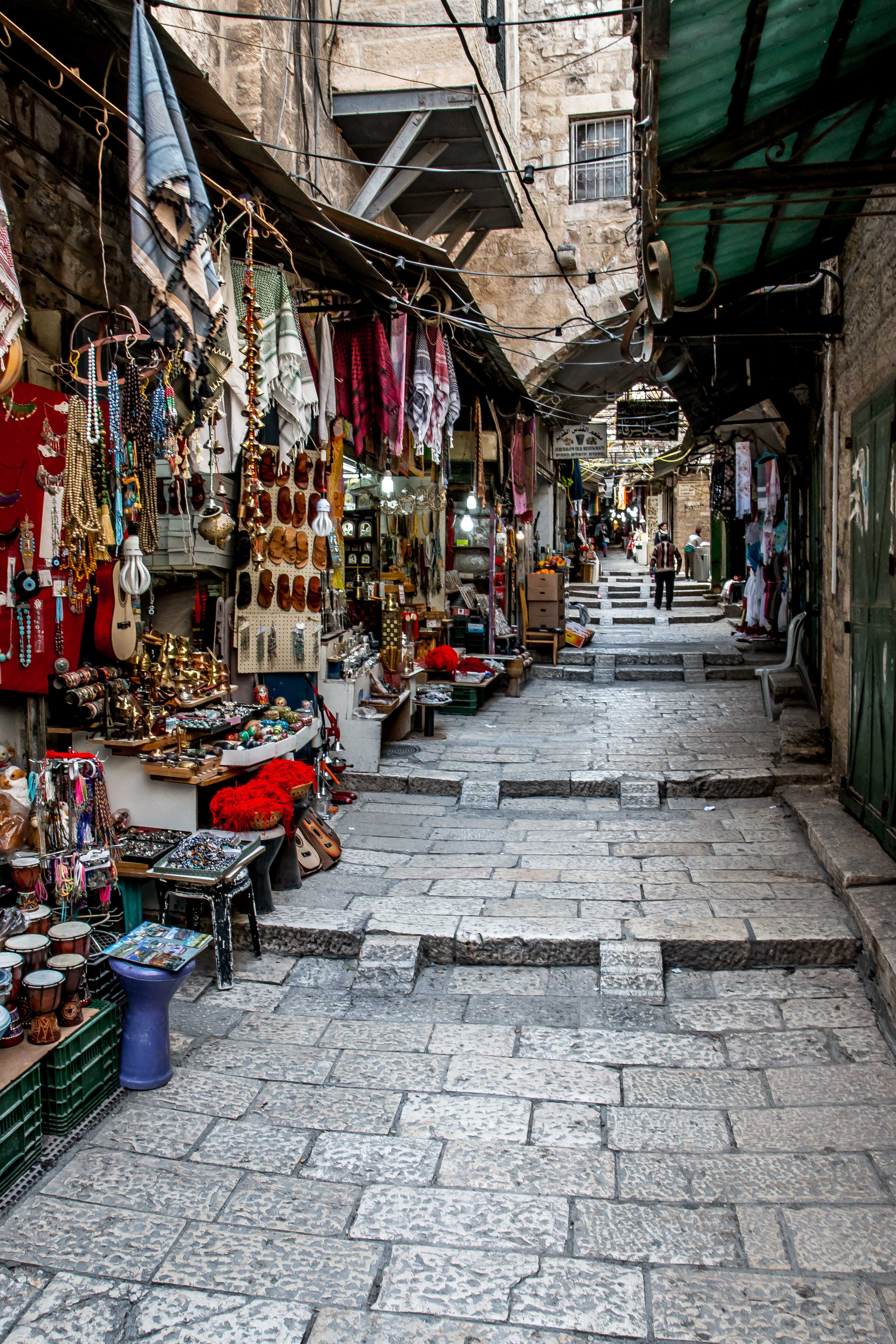
A street in the Muslim Quarter

== See also ==
- Bezetha
- Demographic history of Jerusalem
- Gates of the Temple Mount
- History of Jerusalem
- List of cities with defensive walls
- List of places in Jerusalem
- Walls of Jerusalem
- Zedekiah's Cave

== Bibliography ==
- Arnon, Adar (January 1992). "The Quarters of Jerusalem in the Ottoman Period". Middle Eastern Studies. 28 (1). Taylor & Francis: 1–65. doi:10.1080/00263209208700889. ISSN 0026-3206. JSTOR 4283477.
- Gorenberg, Gershom (2007). The Accidental Empire: Israel and the Birth of the Settlements, 1967–1977. Macmillan Publishers. ISBN 978-1-466-80054-0.
- Khamaisi, Rassem; Brooks, Robert; Margalit, Meir; Nasrallah, Rami; Yunan, Michael; Owais, Abdalla (2009). Jerusalem Old City: Urban Fabric and Geopolitical Implications (PDF). Jerusalem: International Peace and Cooperation Center. ISBN 978-965-7283-16-5. Archived from the original (PDF) on 28 September 2013.
