= Alain MacMoy =

French film, stage and television actor (1926–2026)

- MacMoy in Je t'aime, je t'aime, 1968
- Born: Charles Germain; 16 October 1926; Morbihan, France
- Died: 19 June 2026 (aged 99)
- Occupations: Film, stage and television actor
- Years active: 1950–2003
- Relatives: Vincent Lemire (son-in-law)

Alain MacMoy (born Charles Germain; 16 October 1926 – 19 June 2026) was a French film, stage and television actor. A recipient of the Legion of Honour, he is known for his performance in the 1998 stage play Pour la galerie, for which he was nominated for a Molière Award in the category Best Supporting Actor.

MacMoy died on 19 June 2026, at the age of 99.
