= Vincent Lemire =

French historian (born 1973)

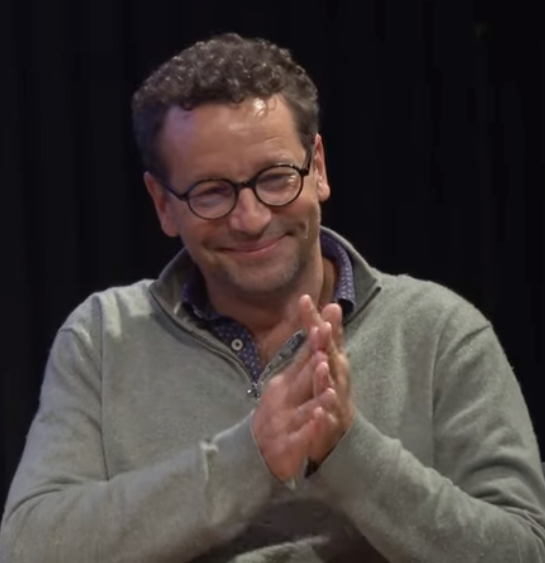
- In a 2025 interview
- Born: 1973 (age 52–53); Paris, France
- Relatives: Alain MacMoy (father-in-law)
- Scientific career
- Fields: History, history of the Middle East, history of Jerusalem and its Moroccan Quarter, history of the French slums from the 1930s to the 1970s, History of photography
- Institutions: University of Paris-Est Marne-la-Vallée
- Thesis: La soif de Jérusalem (2006)
- Doctoral advisor: Robert Ilbert

Vincent Lemire (born 1973) is a French historian, who directs the French Research Center.

== Biography ==
Vincent Lemire was born in 1973.

In 1998, he obtained the Agrégation for History.

He received his doctorate in 2006 for his work La Soif de Jerusalem (lit. "The Thirst of Jerusalem"), which was published as a book in 2011.

His book Jerusalem 1900, published in 2013, was translated into several languages. Lemire works as lecturer at the University of Paris-Est Marne-la-Vallée and director of the European Open Jerusalem project, funded by the European Research Council.

Lemire's research topics are the history of the Middle East, in particular Jerusalem and its Moroccan Quarter, and the history of the French slums from the 1930s to the 1970s. He also deals with the history of photography.

With Katell Berthelot, Julien Loiseau, and Yann Potin, Lemire wrote Jérusalem, Histoire d'une ville-monde, des origines à nos jours (translated as Jerusalem: History of a Global City in English in 2022).

In 2022, Lemire wrote his first graphic novel Histoire de Jérusalem, with illustrations by Christophe Gaultier; in the book, an old olive tree narrates the history of Jerusalem from ancient times to the 21st century. An English version titled The History of Jerusalem: An Illustrated Story of 4,000 Years was released in 2025 by Abrams ComicArts.

== Awards ==
In 2013 Lemire was awarded the Prix Augustin Thierry for his book Jérusalem 1900. La ville sainte à l'âge des possibles.

In 2017, Lemire, Berthelot, Loiseau, and Potin received the Prix Pierre Lafue and the Prix Sophie Barluet for their book Jerusalem: History of a Global City.

== Critical analysis of Vincent Lemire's work ==
Vincent Lemire's work on the history of Jerusalem in the Ottoman, Mandate and contemporary periods has generally received positive reviews from the academic community. Several reviews have praised his methodological and archival contributions. In a review of La Soif de Jérusalem. Essai d'hydrohistoire (1840-1948), historian Frédéric Graber highlights the diversity of the archives mobilized and notes that the book maintains close attention to empirical detail while constructing a clear and readable urban history of Jerusalem from the 1840s to the 1940s.

For the English edition of the graphic history The History of Jerusalem: An Illustrated Story of 4,000 Years, Brian Hillman, assistant professor of philosophy and religious studies at Towson University, writes on the Jewish Book Council website that "The History of Jerusalem combines the rigor of academic history with the accessibility of a graphic novel" and praises the way its visual language conveys a complex historical narrative.

== Publications ==
- The Awakening of Palestinian Hydropolitical Consciousness: The Artas- Jerusalem Water Conflict of 1925, in Jerusalem Quarterly, Vol 48, 2011 online, pdf
- La Soif de Jérusalem: Essai d'hydrohistoire (1840–1948), Éditions de la Sorbonne, 2011, ISBN 978-2859446598 download, pdf (French)
- Publishing Jerusalem's Ottoman Municipal Archives (1892–1917): A Turning Point for the City's Historiography, with Yasemin Avci und Falestin Naili, in Jerusalem Quarterly, Vol 60, 2014 online, pdf
- Ouvrir les archives d'une ville fermée?, université Paris-Est, Marne-la-Vallée, 2015, online, pdf
- Jérusalem 1900. La ville sainte à l'âge des possibles, Points, 2016, ISBN 978-2757862285 (French), this book has been translated into English, Arabic, Hebrew and Chinese
- Jerusalem, histoire d'une ville-monde des origines a nos jours: Histoire d'une ville-monde, des origines à nos jours, Editions Flammarion, 2016, ISBN 978-2081389885 (French)
- Révolutions - Quand les peuples font l'histoire, BELIN, 2017, ISBN 978-2410010596, with Mathilde Larrère, Félix Chartreux, Maud Chirio, Eugénia Paleraki (French)
- Across the Archives: New Sources on the Ethiopian Christian Community in Jerusalem, 1840–1940, with Stéphane Ancel, in Jerusalem Quarterly, Vol 71, 2017 online, pdf
- Histoire de Jérusalem, Les Arènes, 2022, ISBN 979-1037507150 (French)
- Jerusalem: History of a Global City, University of California Press, 2022, ISBN 978-0520299900 with Katell Berthelot, Julien Loiseau, Yann Potin (English)
- The History of Jerusalem: An Illustrated Story of 4,000 Years, Abrams ComicArts, 2025, ISBN 978-1419777806 (English)
