= Haim Watzman =

American writer

- חים ווטצמן
- Born: 1956 (age 69–70); Cleveland, Ohio
- Status: Married
- Education: B.A. from Duke University
- Occupations: Freelance translator, author, journalist, blogger
- Notable credit(s): blogger at South Jerusalem; contributes to The Jerusalem Report
- Spouse: Ilana Watzman
- Children: Four children

Haim Watzman (Hebrew: חים ווטצמן; born 1956 in Cleveland, Ohio), is an American-born, Jerusalem-based writer, journalist, and translator.

== Biography ==
Watzman was born in Cleveland, Ohio and grew up in Silver Spring, Maryland. After receiving a B.A. from Duke University, Watzman made aliyah to Israel, where he has lived since 1978 and worked as a freelance translator and journalist. He lives in Jerusalem with his wife, Ilana, and four children.

== Literary career ==
Watzman is the author of Company C: An American’s Life as a Citizen-Soldier in Israel (Farrar, Straus & Giroux 2005), a memoir centered on his service in a reserve infantry unit in the Israel Defense Forces and A Crack in the Earth: A Journey Up Israel’s Rift Valley (Farrar, Straus & Giroux 2007), as well as Necessary Stories (West 26th Street Press 2017).

Watzman is known for his English translations of recent works by Hebrew-language authors. His translations include Tom Segev’s The Seventh Million, Elvis in Jerusalem, One Palestine Complete, and "A State at any Cost", as well as David Grossman’s The Yellow Wind, Sleeping on a Wire, and Death as a Way of Life.

He served for 25 years as Israel correspondent for The Chronicle of Higher Education, and was Israel correspondent for the British science journal Nature. His opinion pieces have appeared on the pages of The New York Times, Los Angeles Times, and The Forward.

Watzman currently writes the monthly “Necessary Stories” column for The Jerusalem Report, and co-authors the widely read South Jerusalem blog, along with Gershom Gorenberg. In 2017 a collection of his "Necessary Stories" was published.

== Published works ==
- Company C: an American's Life as a Citizen-soldier in Israel. New York: Farrar, Straus & Giroux (2005) ISBN 0-374-22633-4
- A Crack in the Earth: A Journey up Israel's Rift Valley. New York: Farrar, Straus & Giroux (2007) ISBN 978-0-374-13058-9
- Necessary Stories. West 26th Street Press (2017) ISBN 978-1-630-64053-8

== Books translated ==
- Tom Segev, A State at Any Cost. The Life of David Ben-Gurion, Farrar, Straus and Giroux, 2019
- Hillel Cohen, Year Zero of the Israel-Arab Conflict, Brandeis University Press, 2015
- Itamar Radai, Palestinians in Jerusalem and Jaffa, 1948. Routledge Studies in the Arab-Israeli Conflict, 2015
- Tuvia Friling, A Jewish Kapo in Auschwitz: History, Memory, and the Politics of Survival. The Schusterman Series in Israel Studies, Brandeis, 2014
- Ephraim Shoham-Steiner, On the Margins of a Minority: Leprosy, Madness, and Disability among the Jews of Medieval Europe. Wayne State University Press, 2014
- Shlomo Avineri, Herzl: Theodor Herzl and the Foundation of the Jewish State. Weidenfeld & Nicolson, 2013
- Anat Helman, Young Tel Aviv: A Tale of Two Cities. The Schusterman Series in Israel Studies, Brandeis, 2012
- Tamar El Or, Reserved Seats: Religion, Gender and Ethnicity in Contemporary Israel. Wayne State University Press, 2012
- Orit Rozin, The Rise of the Individual in 1950s Israel: A Challenge to Collectivism. The Schusterman Series in Israel Studies, Brandeis, 2011
- Boaz Neumann, Land and Desire in Early Zionism. The Schusterman Series in Israel Studies, Brandeis, 2011
- Gilad Margalit, Guilt, Suffering, and Memory: Germany Remembers its Dead of World War II. Indiana University Press, 2010
- Hillel Cohen, Good Arabs: The Israeli Security Agencies and the Israeli Arabs. University of California Press, 2010
- Menachem Klein, The Shift: Israel-Palestine from Border Struggle to Ethnic Conflict. Columbia University Press, 2010
- Yoram Bilu, The Saints’ Impresarios: Dreamers, Healers, and Holy Men in Israel’s Urban Periphery. Academic Studies Press, 2009
- Menachem Klein, A Possible Peace. Columbia University Press, 2007
- Hillel Cohen, Army of Shadows, Palestinian Collaboration with Zionism, 1917–1948. University of California Press, 2007
- Yaakov Lozowick, Hitler's Bureaucrats: The Nazi Security Police and the Banality of Evil. Continuum, 2003
- Menachem Klein, The Jerusalem Problem: The Struggle for Permanent Status. University of Florida Press, 2003
- David Grossman, Death as a Way of Life. Farrar Straus, 2003
- Igal Sarna, The Man Who Fell into a Puddle. Knopf, 2002
- Tom Segev, Elvis in Jerusalem. Metropolitan, 2002
- Tamar El-Or, Next Pesach: Literacy and Identity among Young Orthodox Jewish Women. Wayne State University Press, 2002
- Menachem Klein, Jerusalem: The Contested City. Hurst/NYU Press, 2001
- Tom Segev, One Palestine Complete. Metropolitan, 2000
- Oz Almog, The Sabra: A Portrait, California University Press. 2000
- Tamar El-Or, Educated and Ignorant: On Ultra-Orthodox Women and Their World. Lynne Reinner, 1993
- David Grossman, Sleeping on a Wire. Farrar Straus, 1993
- Tom Segev, The Seventh Million. Hill & Wang, 1993
- David Grossman, The Yellow Wind. Farrar Straus, 1988
- Yuval Noah Harari, Sapiens: A Brief History of Humankind, 2015
