= Golden Gate (Jerusalem) =

Sealed gate of the Old City of Jerusalem

- باب الذهبي - باب الرحمة שער הרחמים
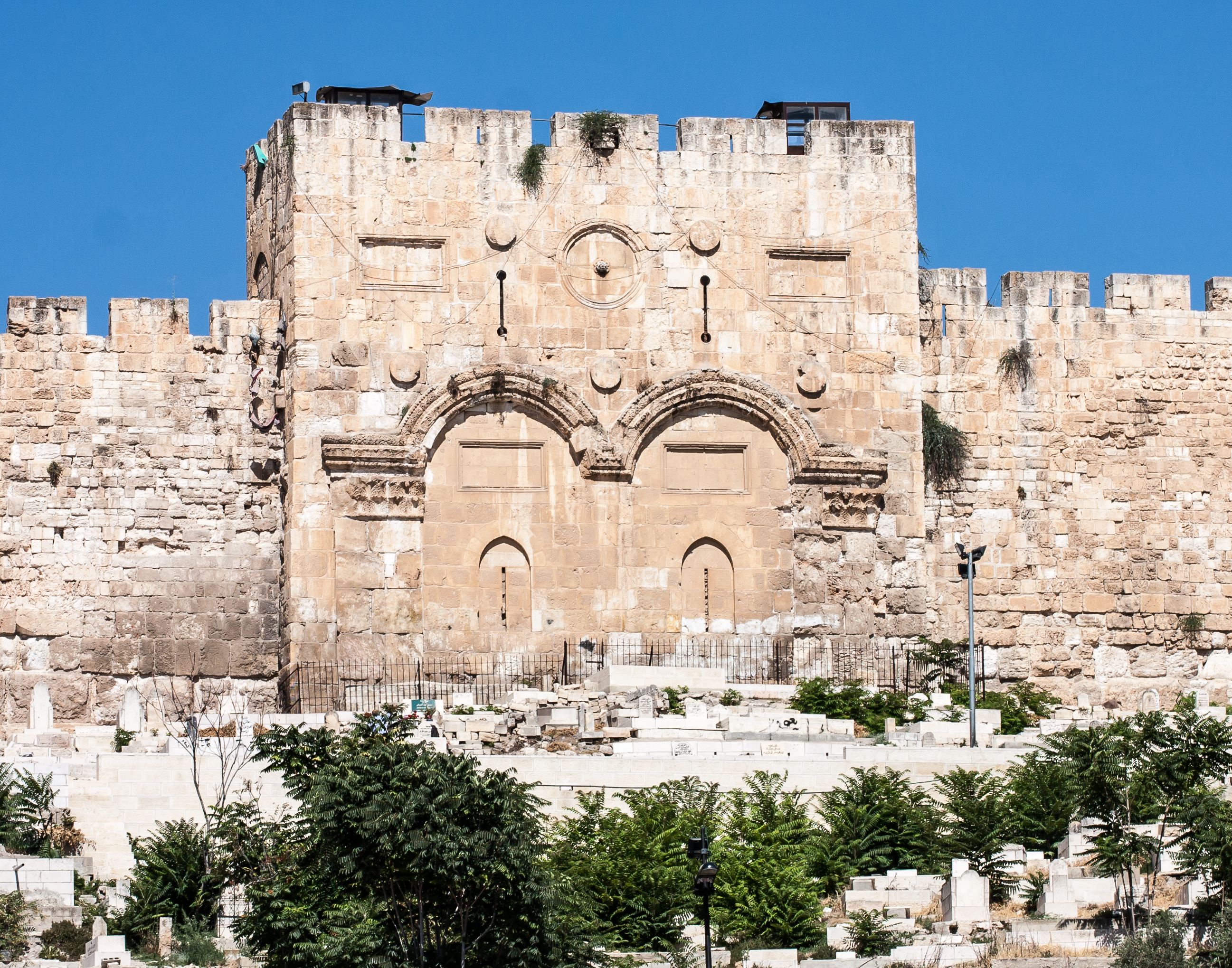
- Outside view today

- Location within Old City of Jerusalem
- Alternative names: Gate of Mercy

General information
- Location: Jerusalem, Israel
- Coordinates: 31°46′44″N 35°14′13″E
- Completed: late Byzantine or early Umayyad period

The Golden Gate or Gate of Mercy (Arabic: باب الرحمة, romanized: Bab al-Raḥma; Arabic: باب ا لذهبي, romanized: Bab al-ḏahabi, lit. 'Golden Gate', Hebrew: שער הרחמים, romanized: Sha'ar Harahamim, lit. 'Gate of Mercy') is the only eastern gate of the Temple Mount (al-Haram al-Sharif), set in the eastern wall of the Al-Aqsa compound in the Old City of Jerusalem, and one of only two gates of the Old City of Jerusalem that used to offer access into the city from the east side.

The gate has been sealed since 1541, the most recent of several sealings. Its interior can be accessed from the Temple Mount or Al-Aqsa compound.

In Jewish tradition, the Messiah will enter Jerusalem through this gate, coming from the Mount of Olives. Christians and Muslims generally believe that this was the gate through which Jesus entered Jerusalem. In Islamic tradition the double gate, known as Bab al-Rahma wa al-Tawba ("Gate of Mercy and Repentance"), is associated with the Day of Judgement, and its gatehouse has served in different periods as a mosque and prayer hall within the Al-Aqsa compound.

== Names ==
Each of the two doors of this double-gate has its own name: Bab al-Raḥma ('Gate of Mercy') for the southern one, and Bab al-Tawbah ('Gate of Repentance') for the northern one.

Another Arabic name is the Gate of Eternal Life.

In the Mishnah (Middot 1:3), the eastern gate of the Second Temple compound is called the Shushan Gate (שער שושן). If the Golden Gate does preserve the location of the Shushan Gate, the concept being based on an exposed ancient arch, most possibly of a former gate, which lies directly beneath the blocked entranceway of the Golden Gate, this would make it the oldest of the gates in Jerusalem's Old City Walls. Jewish and Christian tradition attributes its construction to King Solomon, but there is no archaeological or historical evidence of its being that old.

In the 14th century, Ishtori Haparchi testified in his book Kaftor va-Ferach that the Jews referred to the site as the "Gates of Mercy": "And the masses call it 'Sha'arei Rachamim' (Gates of Mercy), and the Ishmaelites have become accustomed to this and call it 'Bab al-Rahma'".

The modern Hebrew name of the Golden Gate is Sha'ar HaRachamim (שער הרחמים).

== History ==
=== Part of Jerusalem Temple compound ===
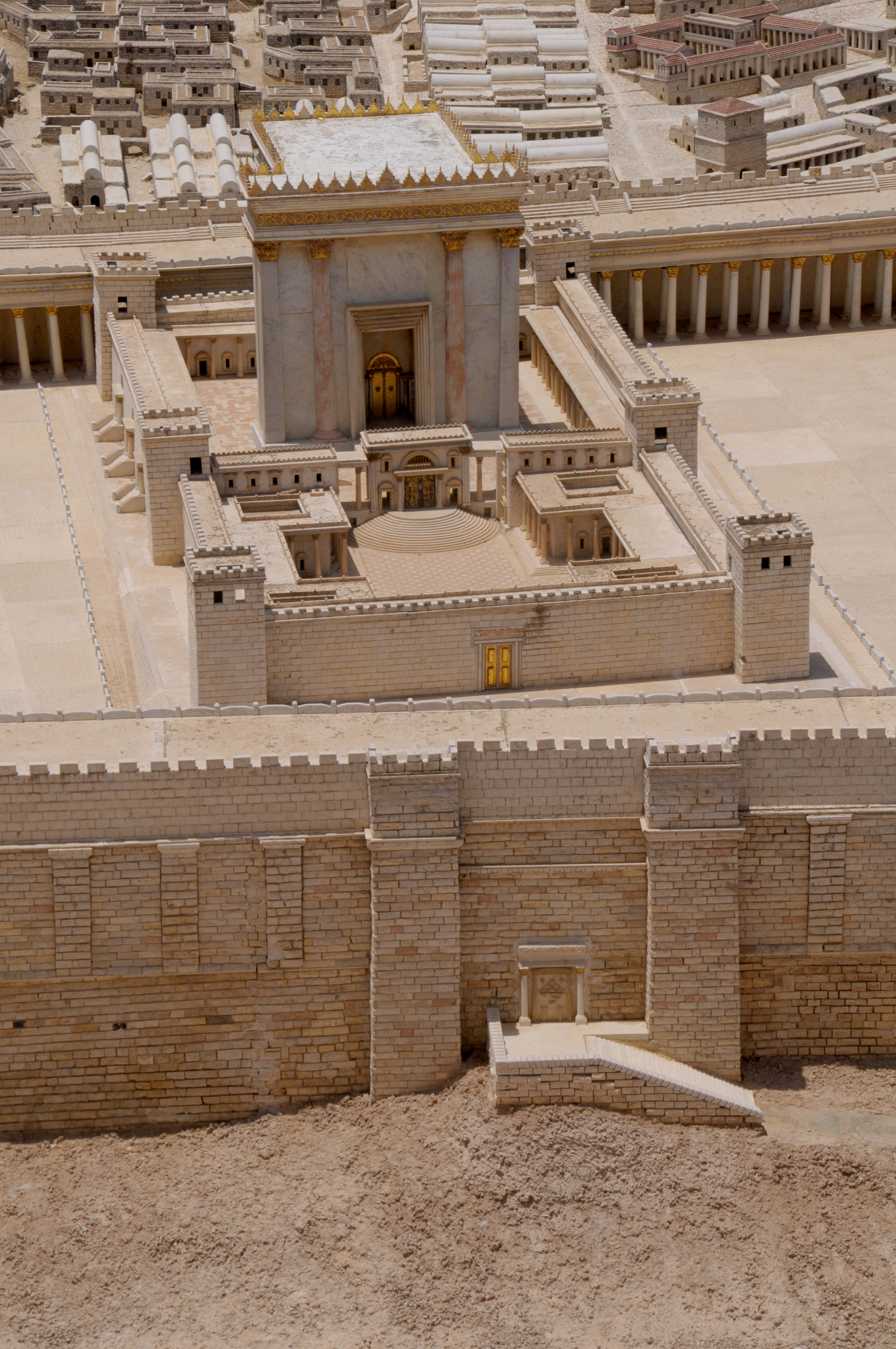
Model of the Second Temple during the 1st century AD. The Shushan Gate is at the bottom.

The Golden Gate is located in the northern third of the Temple Mount's Eastern Wall. The eastern wall now visible was built in at least four stages, during the reign of Hezekiah, during the time of Zerubbabel, in the Hasmonean period and famously in the Herodian period. The present Golden Gate is thought to have been built on top of ruins of an earlier gate in the Eastern Wall. An arch, most possibly of a former gate, lies directly beneath the blocked entranceway of the Golden Gate.

The 1st-century historian, Josephus, mentions an "eastern gate" in his Antiquities of the Jews, and makes note of the fact that this gate was considered within the far northeastern extremity of the inner sacred court. The Mishnah mentions a former causeway which led out of the Temple Mount eastward over the Kidron valley, extending as far as the Mount of Olives. Rabbi Eliezer, dissenting, says that it was not a causeway, but rather marble pillars over which cedar boards had been laid, used by the High Priest and his entourage. This gate, known as the Shushan Gate, was not used by the masses to enter the Temple Mount, but reserved only for the High Priest and all those that aided him when taking out the Red Heifer or the scapegoat on Yom Kippur.

=== Present gate: late Byzantine or early Umayyad ===
The construction date of the present-day Golden Gate is unknown, as the Waqf forbids archaeological work at the Temple Mount. The vast majority of the 19th and early 20th century scholars such as Robinson, Conder, Bartlett, Vincent and Abel, Melchior de Vogüé and Creswell dated the gate to different periods prior to the Islamic period. Later, in the light of developing research, new arguments have been advanced by many scholars such as Hamilton, Sharon, Ben-Dov, Rozen Ayalon, Tsafrir and Wilkinson that the gate should be dated to the 7th–8th century AD, to the Umayyad period. Today, opinions are shared between a late Byzantine and an early Umayyad date.

According to some scholars, the present gate was built circa 520 AD, during the Byzantine period, as part of Justinian I's building program in Jerusalem, on top of the ruins of the earlier gate in the wall. An alternative theory holds that it was built in the later part of the 7th century by Byzantine artisans employed by the Umayyad Caliphs.

The Dutch archaeologist Leen Ritmeyer, who explored the gate in the 1970s, reached the conclusion that the two monolithic massive gateposts seen on the inside of the gate belong to an old structure of the gate, thought to be the Shushan Gate (mentioned in Mishnah Middot 1:3 as being the only gate in the Eastern Wall), and that it dates from the First Temple period. Philosopher Maimonides wrote in his Code of Jewish Law that, during the time of the Second Temple, "one entering from the East Gate of the Temple Mount would walk on level ground till the end of the Rampart. From the Rampart he would ascend 12 steps to the Court of Women, the height of each step being half a cubit and its tread half a cubit."

=== Abbasid, Fatimid, Crusader, and Ayyubid periods ===
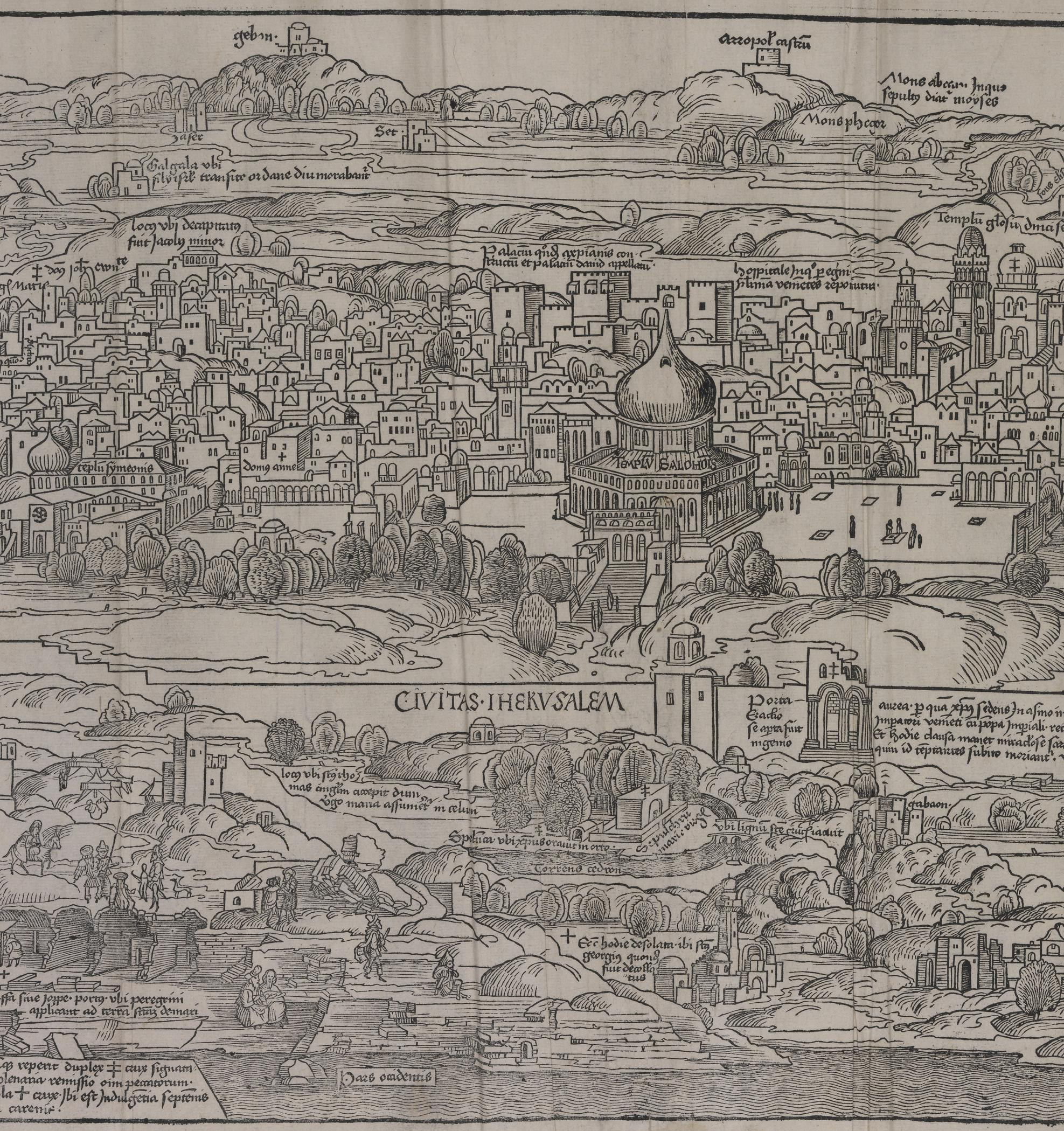
City of Jerusalem in the Peregrinatio in terram sanctam (1486) by Bernhard von Breidenbach. The Golden Gate appears damaged and sealed, just below the Dome of the Rock.

Closed by the Muslims in 810, reopened in 1102 by the Crusaders, it was walled up by Saladin after regaining Jerusalem in 1187.

=== Ottoman period ===
Ottoman Sultan Suleiman the Magnificent rebuilt it together with the city walls, but walled it up in 1541, most likely for purely defensive reasons, and it stayed that way.

During the Ottoman period, the inner recess (vestibule) built within the western side of the Golden Gate was used for brick burning, which bricks were then used to renovate buildings and stairs in the Haram esh-Sharif (Temple Mount enclosure). A small mosque was built near the Golden Gate to cater to the brick burners, but which was later destroyed, along with part of the Gate's wall, by order of the Sultan in the 19th century in order to make room for renovations. A new wall and two new arches were added to the Gate's western interior. The gate house, which is accessed from the Temple Mount by descending a wide flight of stairs leading into it, and where the current ground floor is built in the shape of a rectangle measuring 24 by 17 metres (79 by 56 ft) (exterior wall measurements), is surrounded by walls, the length of which space being divided by a row of columns forming two equal divisions. Below the ground level, inside a tomb, can be seen the top of an ancient arch (the lower stones still buried underground), the existence of which leads to the conclusion that the original ground level was much lower than what it is today.

The Ottoman Turks transformed the walled-up gate into a watchtower.

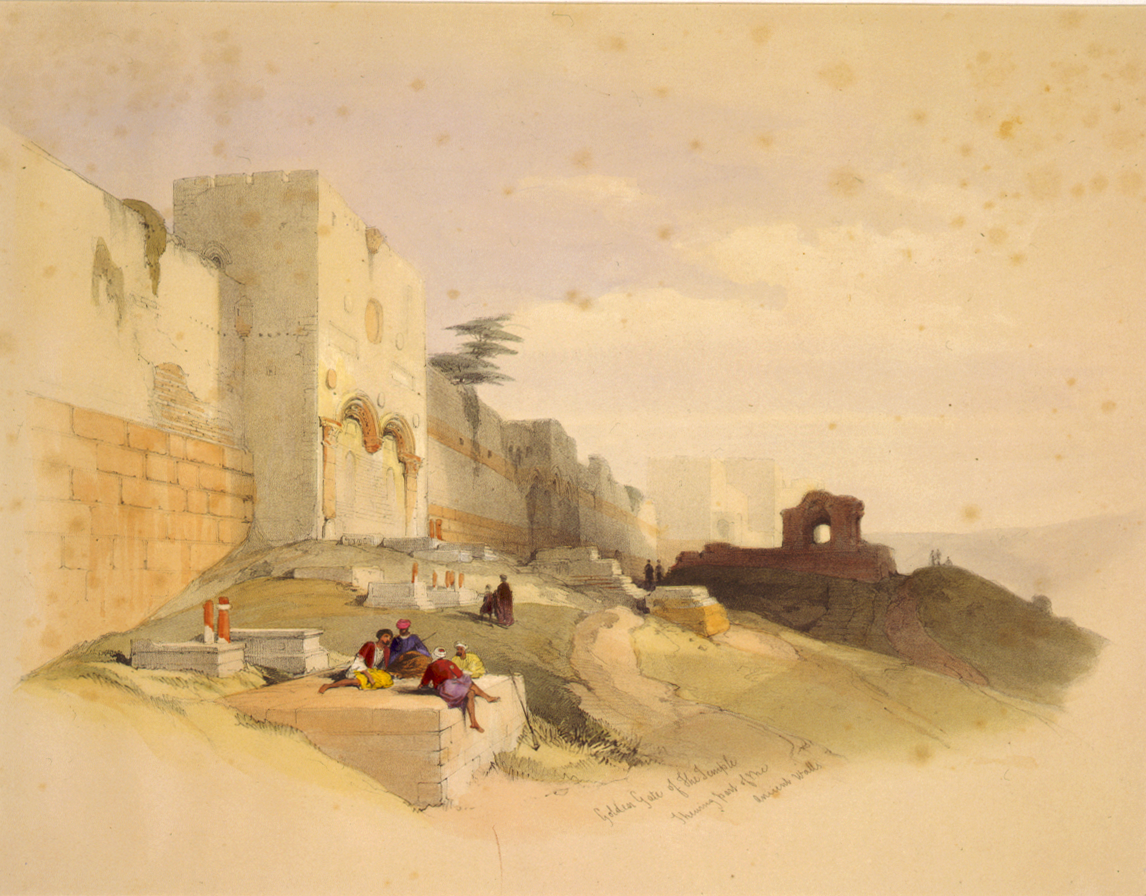
Golden Gate of the Temple Shewing Part of the Ancient Walls (1842). Lithograph by Louis Haghe from an original by David Roberts

=== Recent history ===
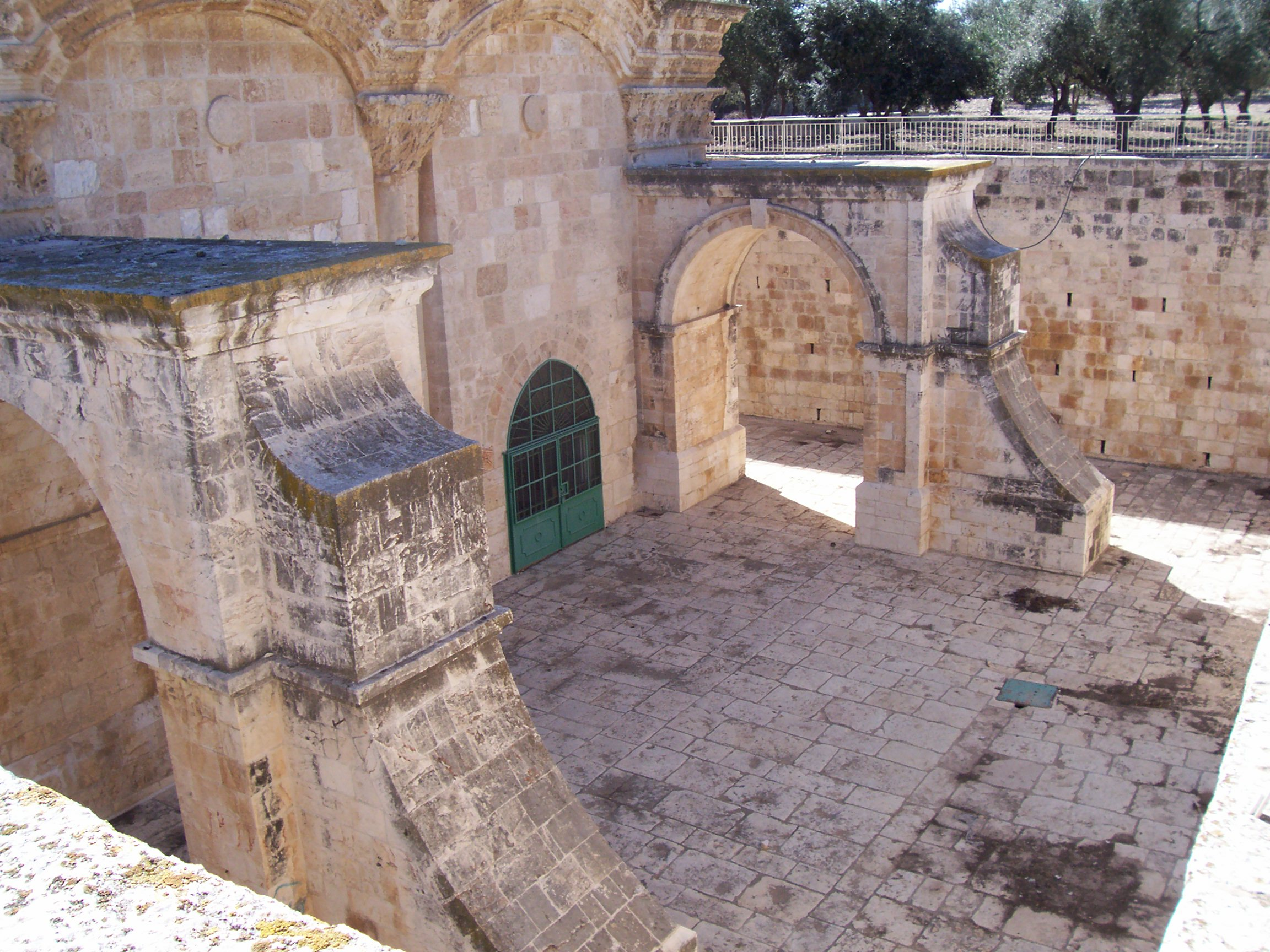
The western facade with one of two doors toward Haram compound

Access to the Golden Gate from within the Temple Mount was sealed off by Israeli authorities in 2003 because the group managing the area had ties to Hamas. The gate was kept closed in order to stop construction work there by the Islamic Waqf. Israeli officials believe the work led to the destruction of antiquities from periods of Jewish presence in the area.

In February 2019, the interior of the gate was reopened for Muslim worshippers from the Temple Mount. However, the gate itself still remains sealed.

== Description ==
The Golden Gate is a rectangular stonework structure with two decorated facades. Unlike other gates in al-Aqsa enclave, the eastern façade was not built level with the wall of the enclave, but projects two meters out from the wall.

The Golden Gate has two passages. The two bays are reflected in its plan and main elevations; two doorways are followed by a double passage covered by three pairs of domes. On the ground floor level a vaulted hall is divided by four columns into two aisles, which lead to the Door of Mercy, Bab al-Rahma, and the Door of Repentance, Bab al-Taubah; an upper floor room has the two roof domes as its ceiling.

Originally, the eastern facade of the Golden Gate had two large doorways, separated by a column. Each doorway measures 3.90 metres (12.8 ft) in width, supporting a semicircular arch with a decorated frieze. The doorways in the eastern facade were blocked up in the Ottoman period. It is noticed that some features in the decoration of the Golden Gate bear a close resemblance to the decoration in other non-Muslim buildings that existed in the Levant.

The openings of the Golden Gate lead to a rectangular domed vestibule, measuring 20.37 metres (66.8 ft) in length and 10.50 metres (34.4 ft) in width (interior wall measurements). At that time, the hall consisted of six shallow domes, which have elliptical shape, two of which were changed later. These domes are separated by arches of an elliptical shape springing from two pilasters at the entrances and two central columns. Each dome in the Golden Gate is constructed over a square plan, so special stones are required to form the successive stone circles that form the dome. Architecturally, the spatial treatment of the gate is somewhat interesting; shifting the facade 2 m (6 ft 7 in) out of the wall indicates a clear definition of its location. The most important question concerning this gate is the matter of motive.

== Symbolism ==
According to Jewish tradition, the Shekhinah (שכינה) (Divine Presence) used to appear through the eastern Gate, and will appear again when the Messiah comes (Ezekiel 44:1–3) and a new gate replaces the present one; that might be why Jews used to pray in medieval times for mercy at the former gate at this location, another possible reason being that in the Crusader period, when this habit was first documented, they were not allowed into the city where the Western Wall is located. Hence the name "Gate of Mercy".

In Christian apocryphal texts, the gate was the scene of the meeting between the parents of Mary, so that the gate became the symbol of the Immaculate Conception of Mary and Joachim and Anne Meeting at the Golden Gate became a standard subject in cycles depicting the Life of the Virgin. Some equate it with the Beautiful Gate mentioned in Acts 3; though many others would disagree with that identification. It appears the basis for equating the Golden Gate with the Beautiful Gate in Acts "is a result of the confusion between the Latin aurea (golden) with the Greek horaios (beautiful)." However, this is only a supposition; there is no evidence for this, which some scholars are careful to point out. For example, Denys Pringle stated, "however, by a confusion that may have had something to do with the similarity between the Greek ὡραία and the Latin ''aurea'', from the seventh century onwards it was more usually identified in Latin sources as the Golden Gate."

It is also said that Jesus, riding on a donkey, passed through this gate on Palm Sunday, in fulfillment of the Jewish prophecy concerning the Messiah (Ezekiel 44:1-3). The Synoptic Gospels appear to support this belief by indicating Jesus came down from the direction of the Mount of Olives and immediately arrived at the Temple Mount (Mark 11:1, 11:11). The Gospel of John alternatively suggests the Pharisees were watching the arrival, possibly from the Temple Mount. Those who believe the "Golden Gate" to be a fulfillment of a prophecy in the book of Ezekiel (44:1-3) spiritualize these words (i.e., using Typical, Figurative or Allegorical interpretation).

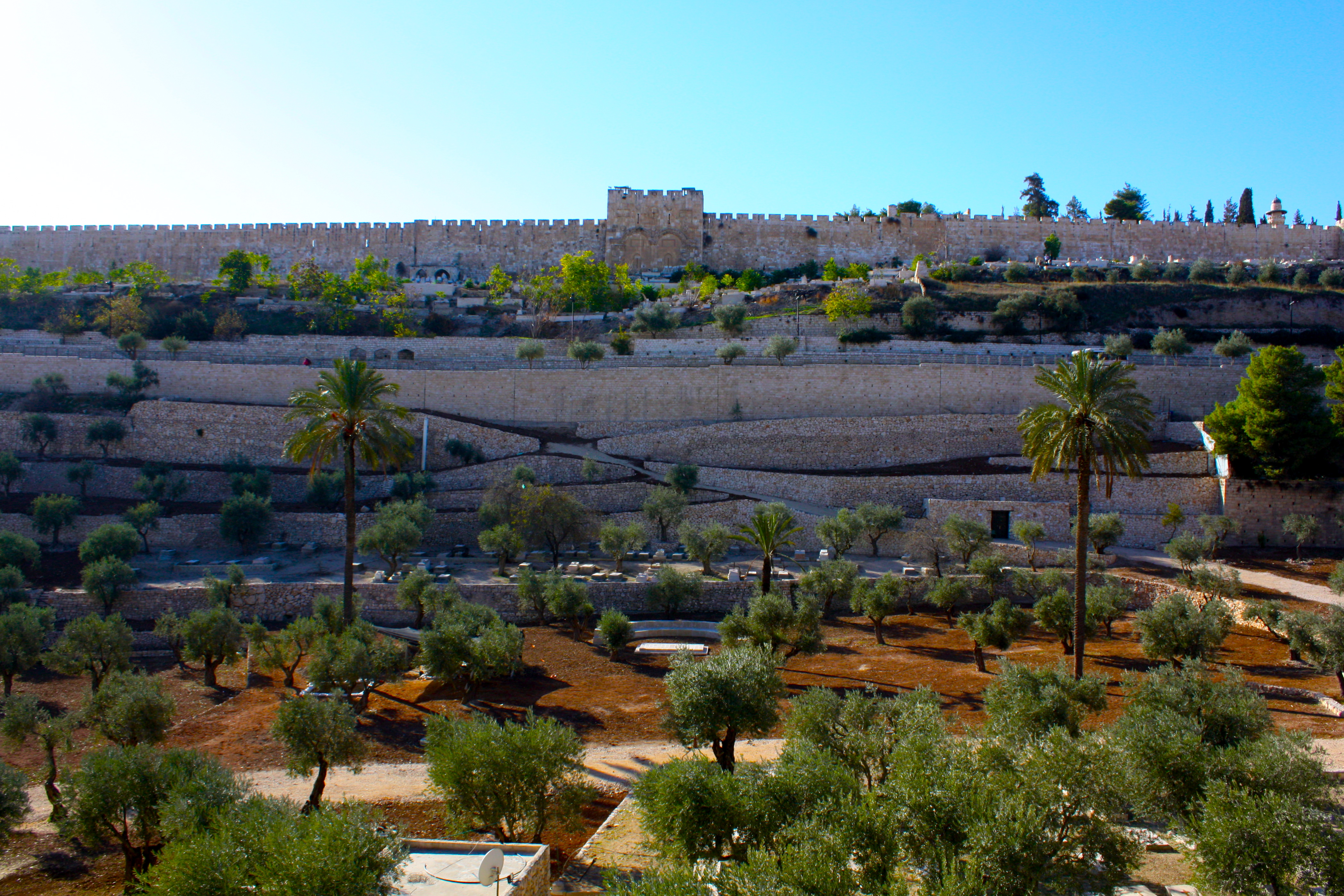
The Golden Gate as seen from the western slopes of the Mount of Olives

However, Biblical scholars using the Historical-Grammatical method of interpretation (basically, reading a book for the meaning its author intended) point out that the context of chapters 40-46 do not refer to either a city gate during the time of Jesus nor one today, but rather to a temple gate in which "the glory of the LORD filled the temple (43:5 RSV)" and "will dwell in the midst of the people of Israel for ever (43:7 RSV)". Thus, as Dyer points out, some interpret chapters 40 ff. of Ezekiel as "prophesying about the church in a figurative sense; he did not have a literal temple in mind." Whereas others see these passages as referring to a "still-future literal temple."

Since the early times of Muslim rule over the holy region Bayt al-Maqdis, some Muslims, such as 'Ubadah ibn al-Samit, linked the eastern wall of the enclave with the Last Day. According to Ibn Kathir, this wall is not the wall mentioned in the Quranic verse "so a wall will be put up betwixt them, with a gate therein" [57:13], but it was mentioned by some commentators as an example for the clarification of the meaning of the verse. Since that time, this example probably encouraged Muslims to bury their dead immediately outside the eastern wall of the al-Aqsa enclave. In any case, if the name "al-Rahmah" (Mercy) truly exists since the construction of the gate, this suggests that the gate is part of an overall concept based on the idea related to the place, specifically the Rock, as that of the Last Day. Then it can be argued that Bab al-Rahmah symbolises a gate in paradise or an entry to Mercy. Whatever the construction motive of Bab al-Rahmah might have been, it was built during the early Islamic period, and it is the most significant gate of the enclave.

== In Christian culture ==
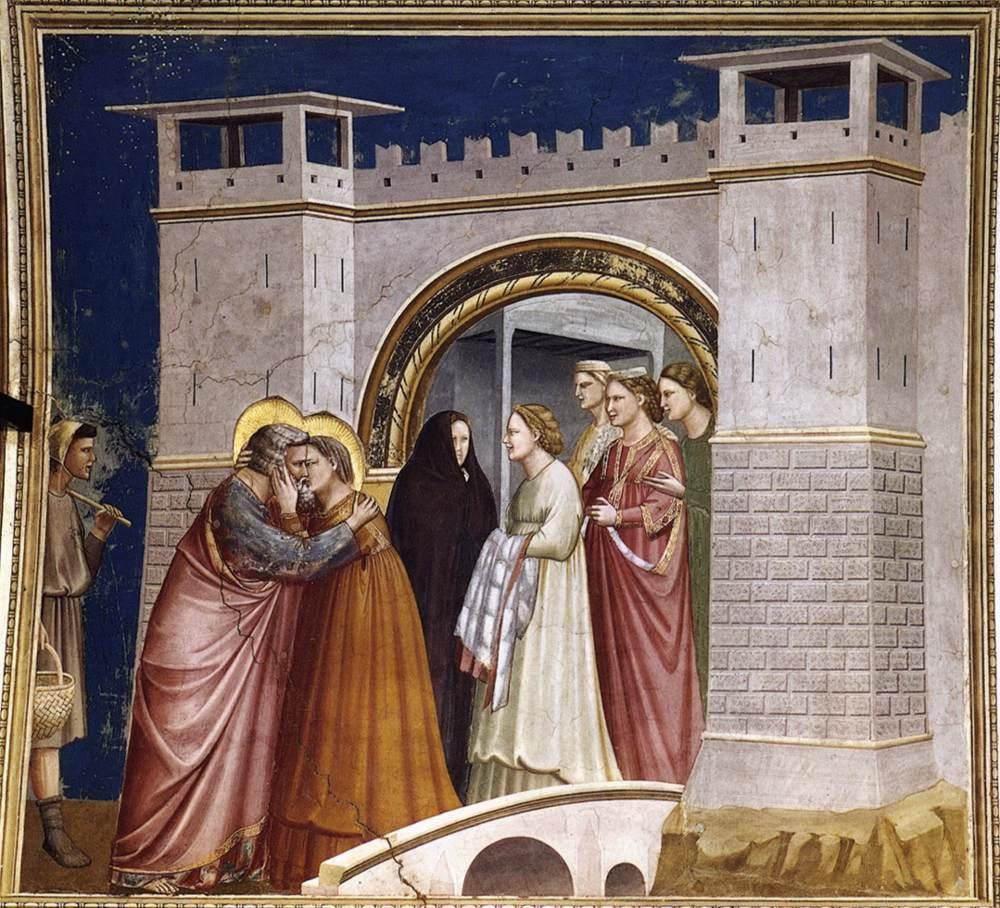
Giotto di Bondone, Legend of St Joachim, Meeting at the Golden Gate, 1305 is an early depiction of the scene.

Honoring the Jewish tradition (see above) and inspired by apocryphal accounts of the life of the Virgin Mary, medieval Christian artists depicted the relationship of Jesus's maternal grandparents Joachim and Anne Meeting at the Golden Gate. The couple came to represent the Christian ideal of chastity in conjugal relations within marriage. The pious custom of a bridegroom carrying his bride across the threshold of their marital home may be based in the traditional symbolism of the Golden Gate to the faithful. In medieval art, the doctrine of the Immaculate Conception of the mother of Christ was commonly depicted in images of the Virgin and Child with Saint Anne (in Italian the Metterza), the three generations of grandmother, mother, and son.

The metaphor also features heavily in the personalist phenomenology of Pope John Paul II, his Theology of the Body, a collection of reflections on this theme Crossing the Threshold of Hope were written to encourage the Catholic faithful facing the challenges of materialism and increasing secularism and published on the cusp of the new millennium in 1998. The threshold between the earthly and heavenly realms symbolized by the Golden Gate represents the Mystical Body of the Church, often viewed as the Bride of Christ.

In Christian eschatology, sunrise in the east symbolizes both Christ's resurrection at dawn on Easter Sunday and the direction of his Second Coming. Sanctuaries for Christian congregational worship at an altar are often arranged with respect to the east. City gates in Christian urban centers often contain religious artifacts intended to guard the city from attacks and to bless travelers. The Ostra Brama in Vilnius, Lithuania contains an icon of Our Lady of the Gate of Dawn, which is venerated by both Catholic and Orthodox inhabitants.

== Topography east of the Old City ==
The Golden Gate is one of the few sealed gates in Jerusalem's Old City Walls, along with the Huldah Gates, and a small Biblical and Crusader-era postern located several stories above ground on the southern side of the eastern wall.

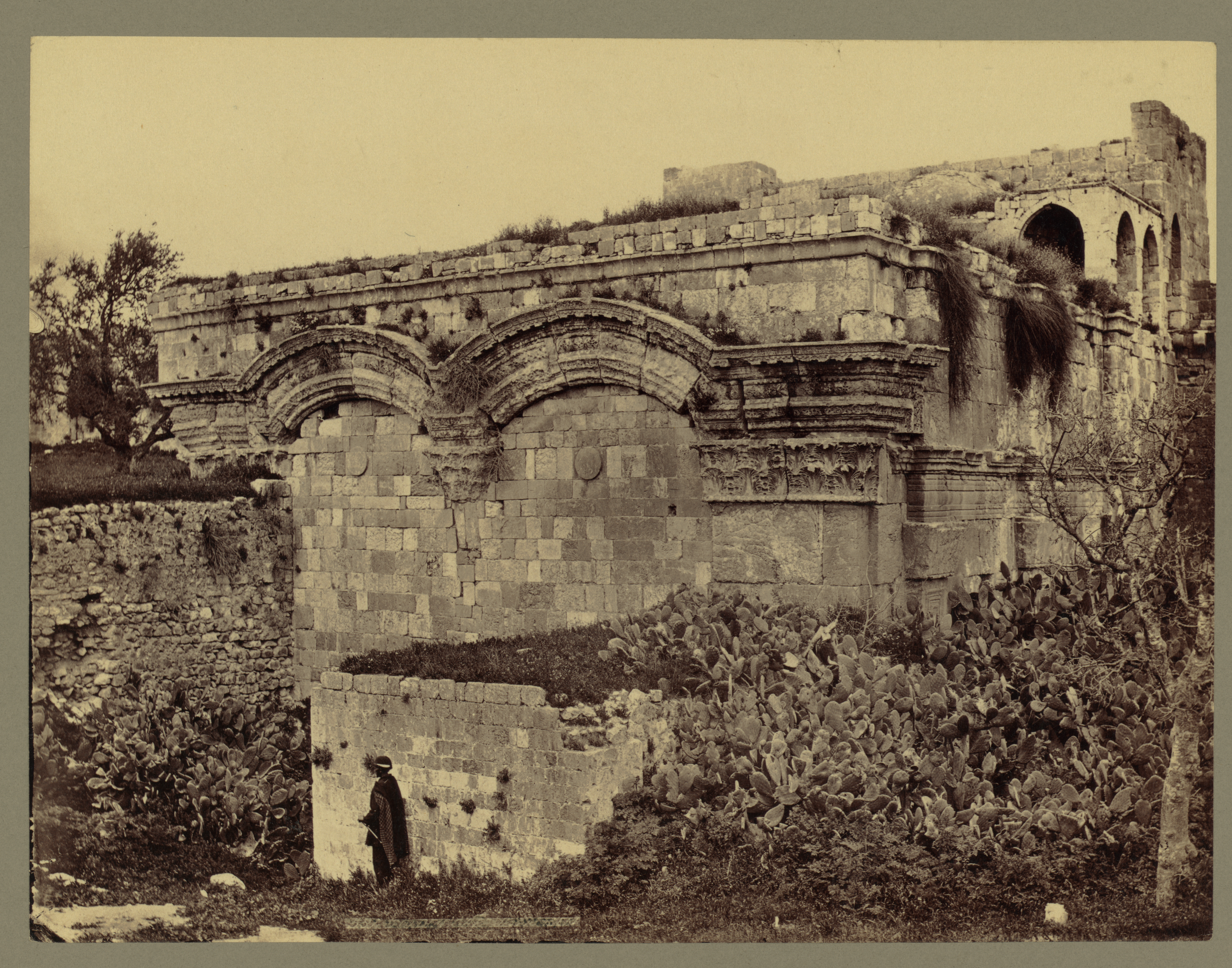
Golden Gate from within the Temple Mount, in the 19th century.

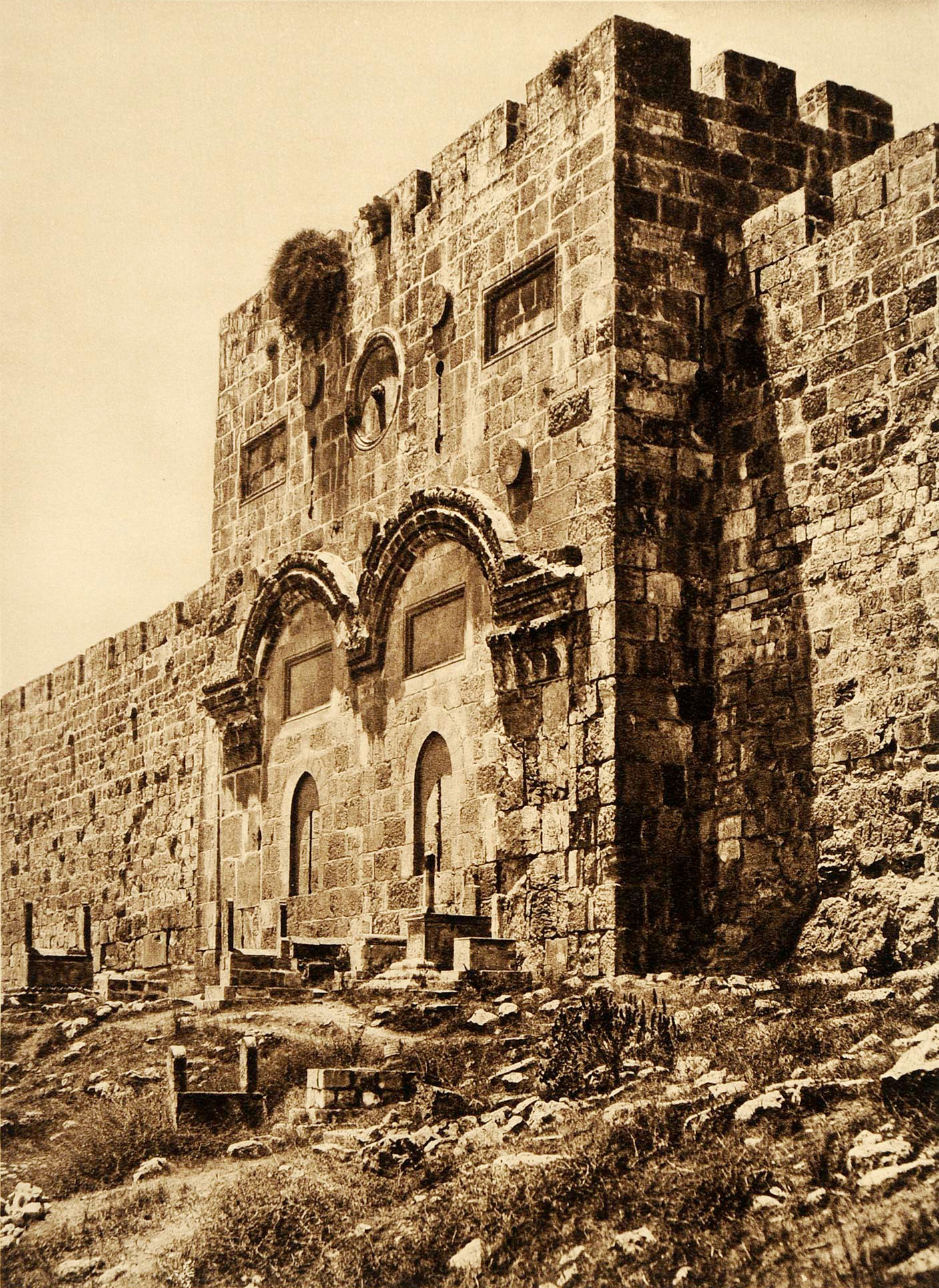
Golden Gate in the 1920s

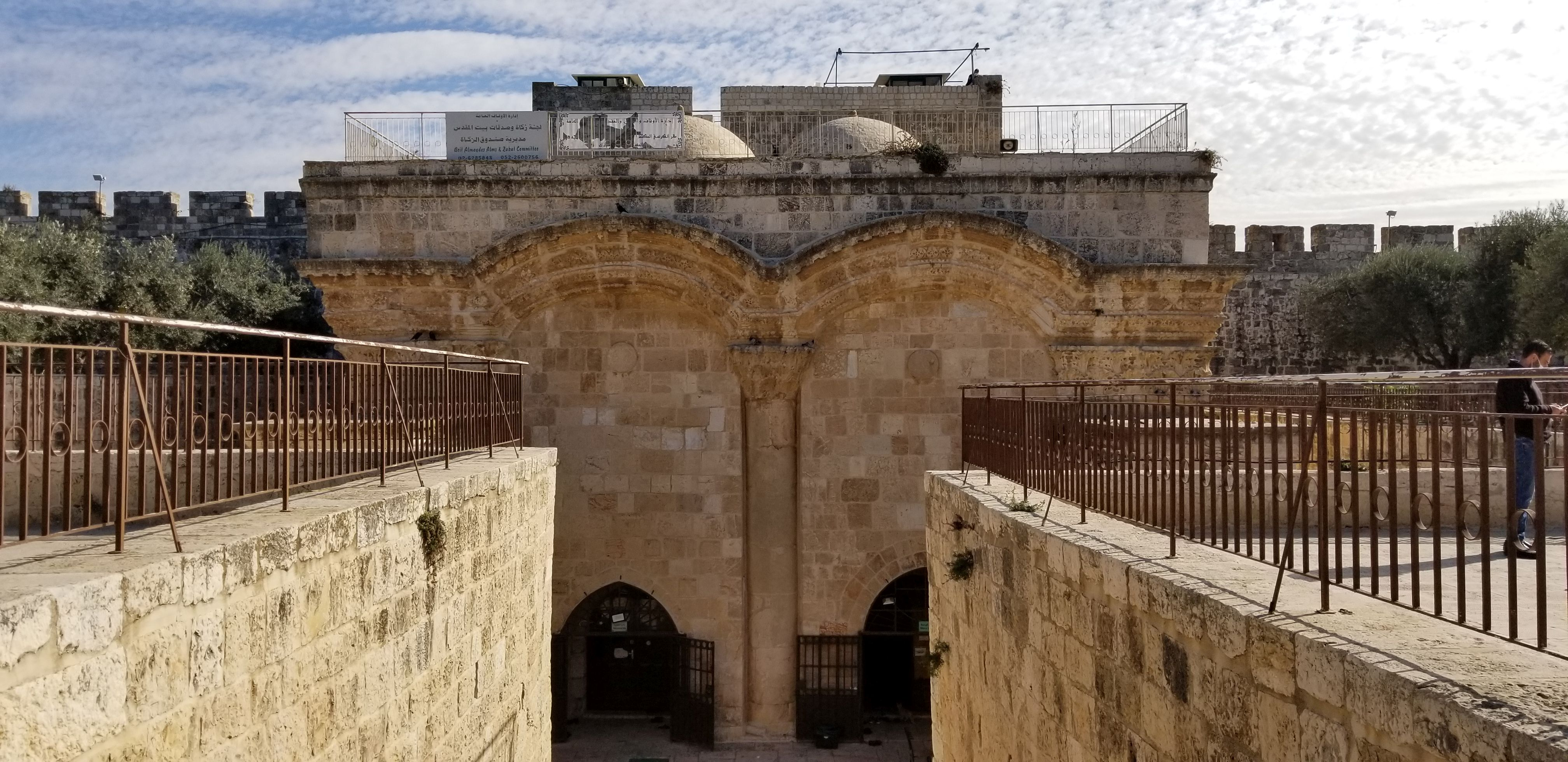
Golden Gate as seen from inside the Temple Mount
