= Eastern Wall =

Wall of the Temple Mount in Jerusalem

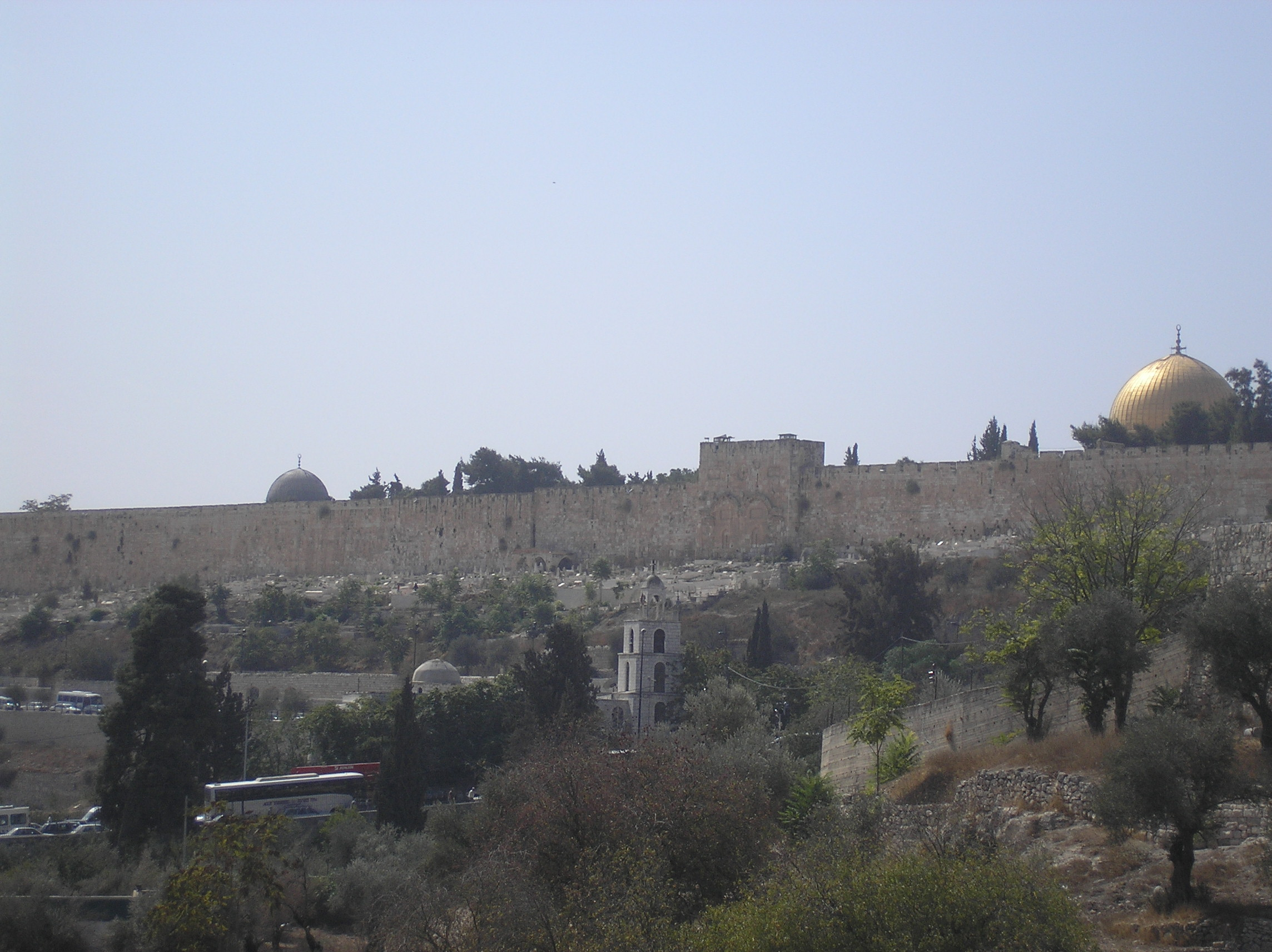
Eastern Wall of the Temple Mount showing Muslim cemetery along the wall

The Eastern Wall is an ancient structure in Jerusalem that is both part of the eastern side of the city wall of Jerusalem and the eastern wall of the ancient Temple Mount.

The Eastern Wall is the oldest of the four visible walls of the Temple Mount; the Northern, Western and Southern Walls date from the period of Herod the Great, who expanded the area of the Temple Mount to the north, west and south. Older walls on these sides are presumed to survive underground. The Eastern Wall now visible was built in at least four stages, possibly as early as the reign of Hezekiah, during the time of Zerubbabel, in the Hasmonean period and in the Herodian period. Repairs and major renovations were made in later periods. Major renovations to the Golden Gate were made in the Umayyad period.

== History of construction ==
=== First Temple period ===
Architectural archaeologist Leen Ritmeyer identifies specific courses of visible ashlars located on to the northern and south of the Golden Gate as earlier than the Hasmonean and Herodian ashlars, comparing them to similar stones of the 6th century BCE in the Temple of Eshmun and Pasargadae. He dates them, on the basis of Biblical texts, to the period of King Hezekiah. More such stones are supposed to survive underground. According to Hershel Shanks, "most scholars," think that Ritmeyer is "correct."

Ritmeyer has pointed out that the Dome of the Rock is seated on a square platform atop the Temple Mount, the sides of which, defined by short flights of steps, are square and parallel to the modern walls of the Mount with one exception: the western steps deviate from parallel. Moreover, the bottom step on the western side of the Dome of the Rock platform is composed of a single line of distinctively large and "beautifully polished" ashlars. According to Ritmeyer, the measurements given in the Mishna, tractate Middot, "The Temple Mount measured 500 cubits by 500 cubits," can be traced on the modern Temple Mount, with this step the outline of the western side of the square and the Eastern Wall the eastern side. The "precise" measurement of an ancient Judean royal cubit, 20.67 inches, outlines these landmarks area exactly. The northern edge of the ancient square was demarcated by Charles Warren, the last archaeologist permitted by the local waqf to explore the underground areas of the Mount, in his the underground structure he labeled as No. 29 in surveys he carried out in the 1860s. The south eastern corner of the 500-cubit ancient platform square is marked by a visible bend in the eastern wall, at the point where a round column protruding from the wall near the top. Ritmeyer proposes that this 500 cubit walled square was constructed by King Hezekiah c. 700 BCE to expand the flat area in which the faithful could gather at the Solomonic-era Temple. The Foundation Stone around which is the ancient Jewish Temple was built and which is now sheltered under the Dome of the Rock, is a natural rock outcrop at the highest point of a Mount Moriah; the natural contour of the land fell away steeply on all sides, although on the eastern side the natural contour formed a flat plateau before falling sharply to the Kidron Valley along the line where the Eastern Wall stands.

=== Hasmonean expansion ===
The Hasmonean dynasty expanded the 500 cubit Temple platform toward the south; distinctively Hasmonean ashlars are visible in the Eastern Wall. The seam between the Hasmonean and Herodian extensions of the wall, known as the "straight joint", is visible as a vertical row of ashlars 32 meters north of the southeast corner.

=== Herodian expansion ===
King Herod expanded the Temple Mount still further toward the south; distinctively Herodian ashlars are visible in the Eastern Wall, in the last stretch before the southeastern corner.

== Gates in the Eastern Wall ==
=== Golden Gate ===
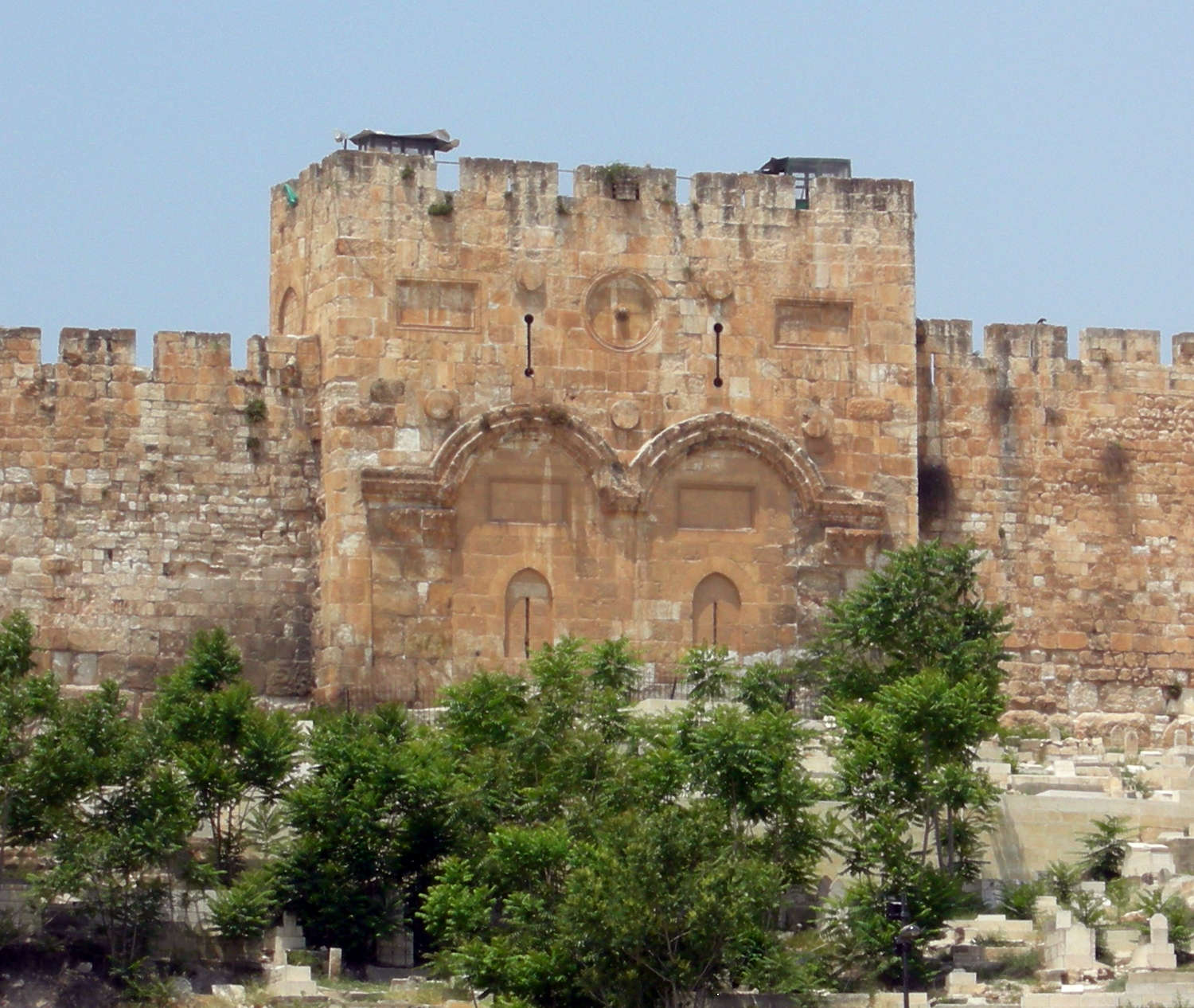
Golden Gate

The magnificent Muslim period Golden Gate (sealed) replaced the ancient Golden Gate. The present gate is understood to have been constructed during the Umayyad period atop the ancient footings.

=== Lion's Gate ===
Lions' Gate is the second gate in the Eastern Wall of Jerusalem, it is located north of the Golden Gate.

== Muslim cemetery ==
There is a Muslim cemetery along the southern stretch of the Eastern Wall. A path through the cemetery and parallel to the wall lies atop the ancient city wall, explored by Charles Warren in excavations since covered over, which once lay just outside the Eastern Wall of the Temple Mount.

== See also ==
- Mizrah (Hebrew), "east"—the direction that Jews in the Diaspora west of Israel face during prayer
