= Tamar El Or =

Israeli sociologist

Tamar El-Or
- תמר אל אור
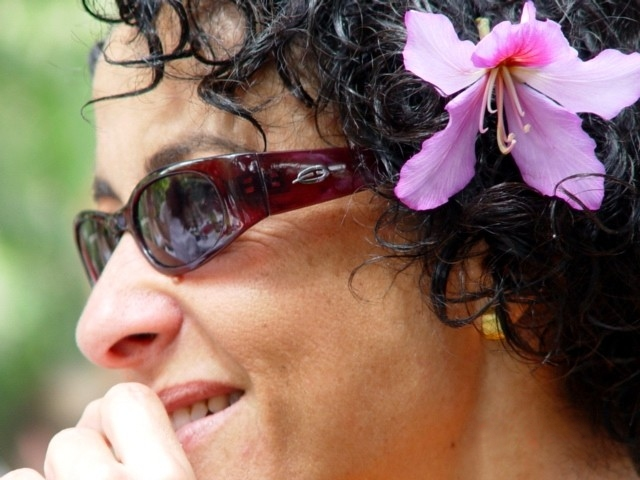
- Born: 1955 (age 70–71)
- Education: Tel Aviv University; Bar-Ilan University
- Scientific career
- Fields: Sociology; Anthropology
- Workplaces: Hebrew University of Jerusalem

Tamar El-Or (Hebrew: תמר אל אור; born in 1955) is an Israeli sociologist and author holding the Sarah Allen Shaine chair of sociology and anthropology at the Hebrew University.

== Research ==
El-Or's Ph.D. dissertation was a study of ultra-Orthodox women in Israel that was published as a book, Educated and Ignorant, in both Hebrew and English. Therein, El-Or discusses the possibility of educating for ignorance, or teaching certain groups (in this case, girls and women) to expect and respect intellectual restrictions. This research in gender and religion debated feminist questions of choice, empowerment, and resistance via the life of Orthodox women.

El-Or's fieldwork and findings on the ultra-Orthodox community led to research on the modern (national) Orthodox community in Israel, and to the book Next Year, I'll Know More. This book describes and analyzes a feminist revolution via knowledge among young women from the modern Orthodox community.

A third project followed these two and was conducted among the Sephardi Mizrahi community, thus covering all three major communities that comprise Israeli Orthodoxy. This research became another book, Reserved seating: Gender, ethnicity, and religion in Israel. It examines questions of class and ethnicity among women from the Sephardi and Ashkenazi Orthodox communities, and those that revolve around orthodoxy. These monographs form a trilogy on gender, religion, and the meanings of knowing.

In 2009-2010, El-Or wrote a short essay on the pedagogy of Tania learning among women from the Hasidic sect of Chabad (Lubavitz), as well as a theoretical comparative work on veiling in Israel, France, Turkey, Belgium, and Morocco.

El-Or has written numerous articles on issues related to her main research fields, as well as articles on other issues, such as Israeli motherhood, anthropological methodology, and sociological aspects of literature and the visual arts, etc.

== Selected publications ==
=== Books ===
- El-Or, Tamar. 1994. Educated and Ignorant: Ultraorthodox Jewish Women and their World . Boulder, CO: Lynne Rienner Pub. (Published in Hebrew, 1992, by Am Oved).
- El-Or, Tamar. 2002. Next Year I Will Know More: Identity and Literacy Among Young Orthodox Women in Israel. Detroit: Wayne State University Press. (Published in Hebrew, 1998, by Am Oved).

=== Selected articles ===
- El-Or, Tamar.1991."Captured Babies: The Ultraorthodox Perception of Non Orthodox Jews". Megamot 34(1):104–121 (Hebrew).
- El-Or, Tamar.1992. "Do You Really Know How They Make Love: The Limits of Intimacy with Ethnographic Informants". Qualitative Sociology 15(1):53–73.
- El-Or, Tamar.1993. "You Can't See Iceland from Shiloh: The Rechelim Case". Alpaim 7:59–81. (Hebrew).
