= Beautiful Gate =

One of the gates of the Temple in Jerusalem prior to 70 AD

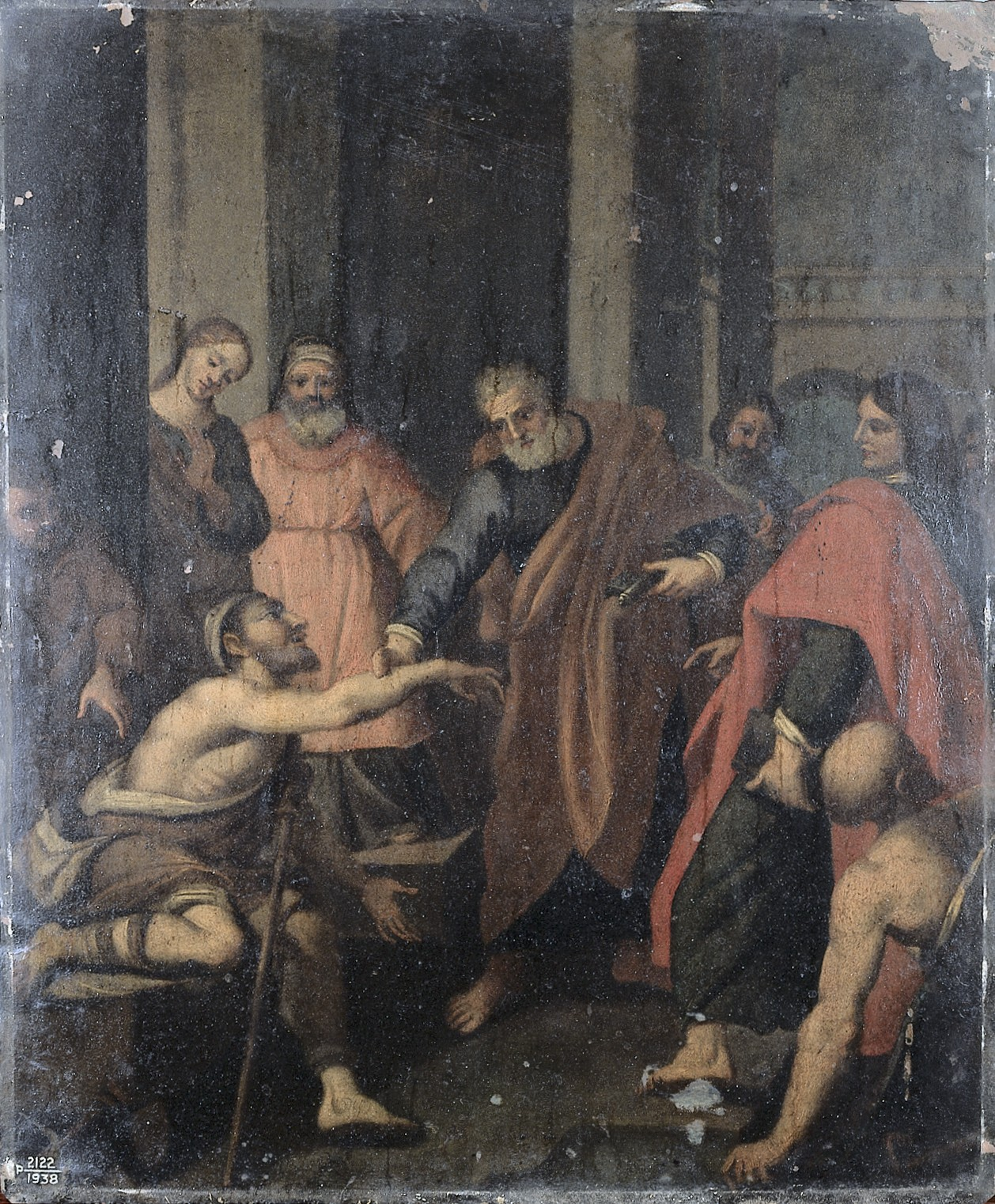
Saints Peter and John healing a cripple at the Beautiful Gate (Bolognese painter, 17th century)

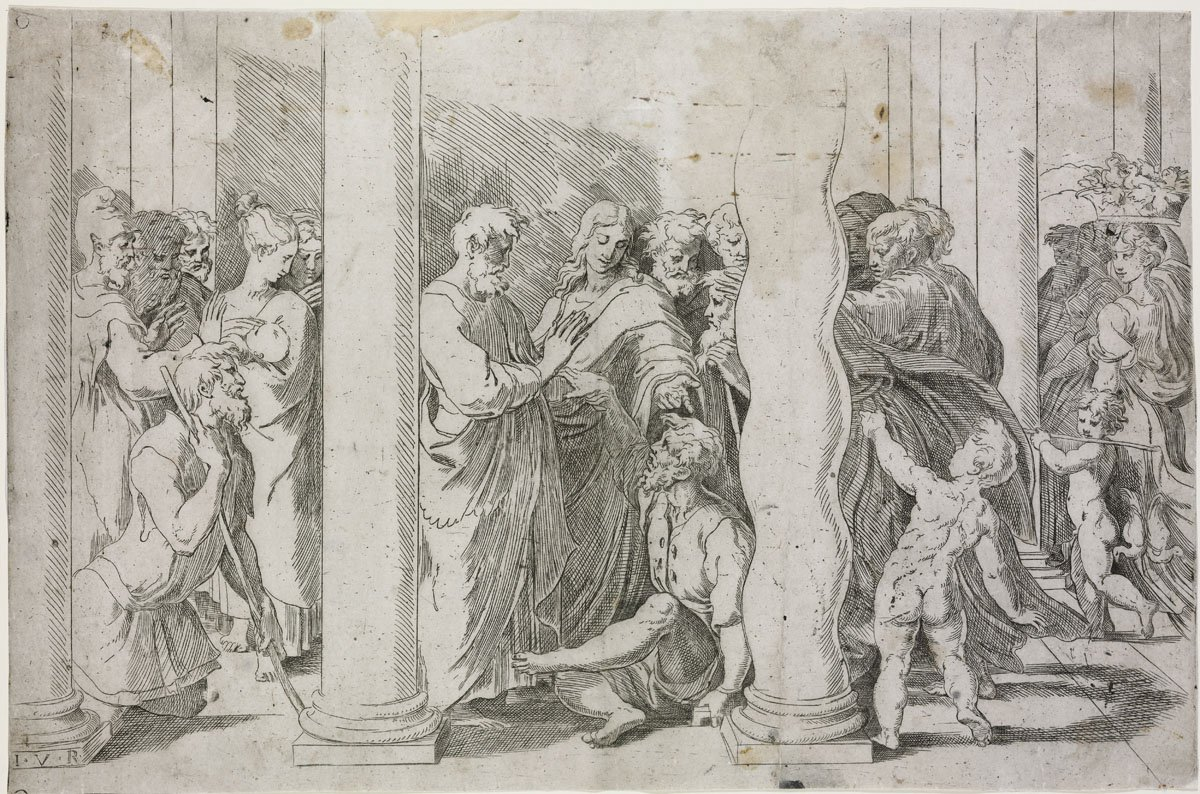
Saint Peter and Saint John Healing the Lame Man at the Beautiful Gate of the Temple (Parmigianino, 16th century)

According to the New Testament, the Beautiful Gate was one of the gates belonging to the Temple in Jerusalem prior to its destruction by the Romans in AD 70. It was referred to as "beautiful" in chapter 3 of the Acts of the Apostles.

== Textual references ==
Acts of the Apostles chapter 3, verses 2 and 10, respectively state:

- την θυραν του ιερου την λεγομενην ωραιαν (tēn thyran tou hierou tēn legomenēn hōraian, the gate of the temple which is called Beautiful)
- τη ωραια πυλη του ιερου (tē hōraia pylē tou hierou, the Beautiful Gate of the temple)

According to the Acts narrative, there was a habitual beggar there with a congenital disability, who sought alms as people entered and left the temple. Peter says to him, "I have no gold and silver but what I do have I give you: In the name of Jesus Christ of Nazareth, rise up and walk". Then taking the man's right hand, he helped the man up and immediately the man's feet and ankles were strengthened and he was able to walk and move instead of laying there begging.

The Greek adjective used to name the gate (hōraios) can be defined as '1. happening or coming at the right time —2. beautiful, fair, lovely'. Some scholars believe the word may refer more to ripeness than to beauty.

== Physical location ==
Attempts by scholars to agree on the identity of the gate by one of its recognized names have met with little success although both the upper inner gate, the Nicanor, and the lower outer gate, the Shushan, have been suggested as candidates.

== See also ==
- Gates of the Temple Mount
