= Gershom Gorenberg =

Israeli-American journalist

- גרשום גורנברג
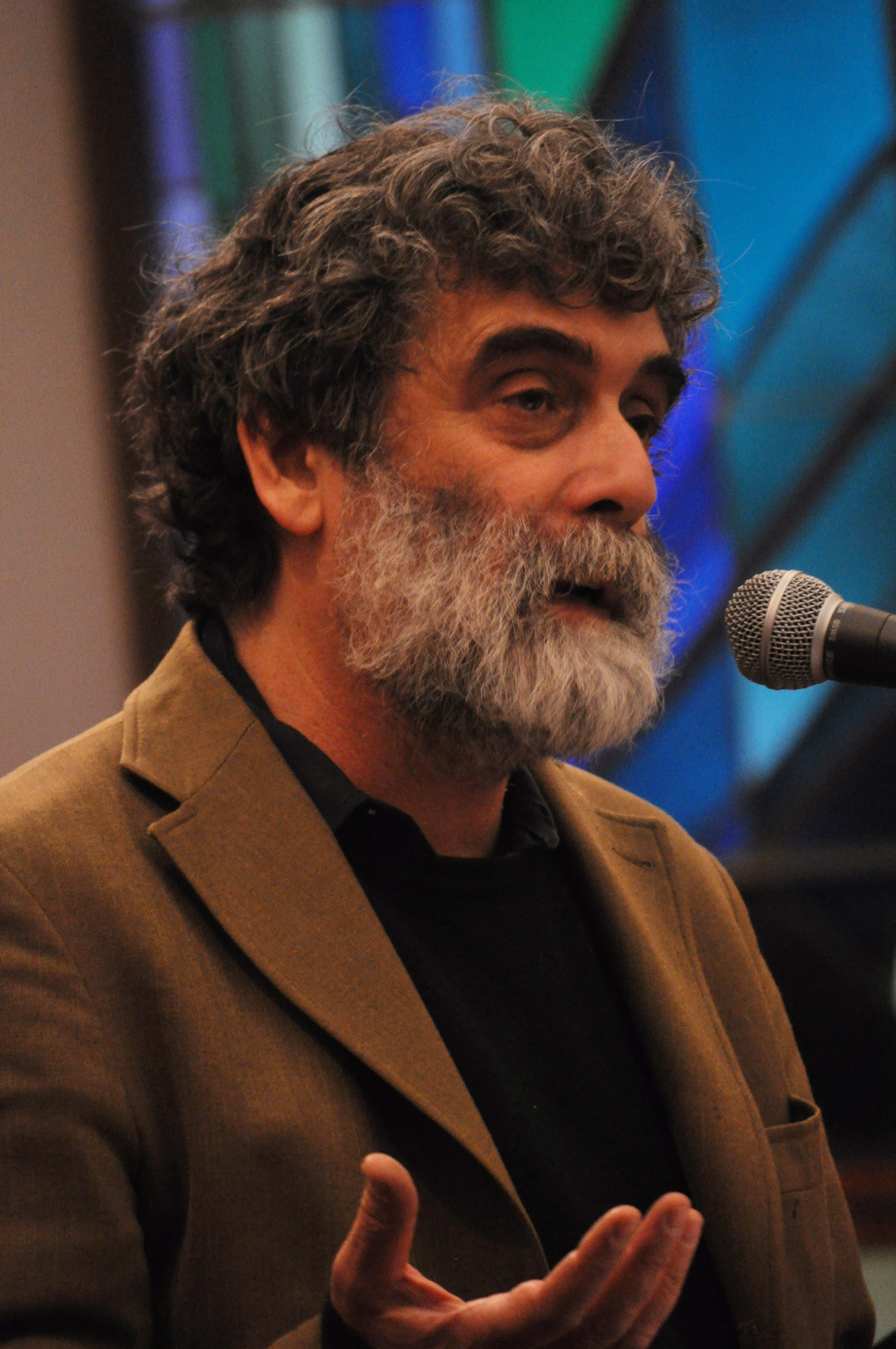
- Born: St. Louis, Missouri
- Education: University of California, Santa Cruz (BA); Hebrew University of Jerusalem (MA)
- Occupations: Journalist, historian
- Spouse: Myra Noveck
- Children: 3

Gershom Gorenberg (Hebrew: גרשום גורנברג) is an American-born Israeli journalist and historian specializing in Middle Eastern politics and the interaction of religion and politics. He is currently a senior correspondent for The American Prospect, a monthly American political magazine. Gorenberg self-identifies as "a left-wing, skeptical Orthodox Zionist Jew".

== Early life and education ==
Gorenberg was born in St. Louis, and grew up in California. In 1977, he traveled to Israel to study, and ultimately decided to immigrate to the country, becoming an American-Israeli dual citizen.

Gorenberg graduated from the University of California, Santa Cruz, and earned his MA in education from the Hebrew University of Jerusalem. He lives in Jerusalem, with his wife, journalist Myra Noveck, and three children.

== Career ==
For many years, Gorenberg served as an associate editor of The Jerusalem Report, an Israeli bi-weekly news magazine. In 1996, he edited a selected collection of Jerusalem Report essays published under the title "Seventy Facets: A Commentary on the Torah from the Pages of The Jerusalem Report." He contributed to the magazine's biography of Yitzhak Rabin, Shalom, Friend: The Life and Legacy of Yitzhak Rabin, which won the National Jewish Book Award for non-fiction. Gorenberg is now a senior correspondent forThe American Prospect.

As an author, Gorenberg is best known for The Accidental Empire: Israel and the Birth of the Settlements, 1967–1977 (2006), a study of the origins of Israeli settlements in the occupied territories following the 1967 Six-Day War. The End of Days: Fundamentalism and the Struggle for the Temple Mount was published in 2000. In The Unmaking of Israel (2011), Gorenberg decries the settler movement and argues that government support for the Haredi undermines Israeli democracy.

Gorenberg has contributed features and commentary on politics, religion, and aspects of Israeli-American relations to newspapers including The New York Times, the Los Angeles Times, and The Washington Post.

Gorenberg blogs at South Jerusalem, together with Haim Watzman. He was a frequent guest on Bloggingheads.tv, particularly in discussions related to Israel. Gorenberg was an associate of the now-closed Center for Millennial Studies at Boston University.

== Bibliography ==
- The End of Days: Fundamentalism and the Struggle for the Temple Mount. New York: Free Press. 2000. ISBN 0684871793.
- The Accidental Empire: Israel and the Birth of the Settlements, 1967-1977. New York: Times Books. 2006. ISBN 080507564X. (Published in the United Kingdom under the title Occupied Territories: The Untold Story of Israel's Settlements)
- The Unmaking of Israel. New York: Harper. 2011. ISBN 978-0061985089.

=== As editor ===
- Seventy Facets: A Commentary on the Torah: From the Pages of the Jerusalem Report. Northvale, New Jersey: Jason Aronson. 1996. ISBN 1568219040.

=== As contributor ===
- Horovitz, David, ed. (1996). Shalom, Friend: The Life and Legacy of Yitzhak Rabin. New York: William Morrow & Co. ISBN 155704287X.
