= Army of Shadows: Palestinian Collaboration with Zionism, 1917–1948 =

2004 book by Hillel Cohen

Army of Shadows: Palestinian Collaboration with Zionism, 1917–1948 is a book published in 2004 by Hillel Cohen. It is about the sale of land and other co-operation between Arabs and Jews in Palestine before the establishment of the State of Israel.

== Overview ==
In this book, Cohen, a scholar at the Harry S. Truman Institute for the Advancement of Peace at the Hebrew University of Jerusalem, documents the thousands of Arabs, ranging from wealthy absentee landlords to fellahin smallholders, who sold land to Zionist organizations. He shows that everyone understood that control of land was a necessary precondition to fulfillment of national goals, both Jewish and Arab. Cohen explains the varied motives of sellers: some wanted money, and some sold land or acted as intelligence agents for the Zionists even while they publicly denounced land sales, but there were also non-monetary motivations. Some thought that co-operating with the Zionists would improve the life of their clans and villages. Others thought that since it was impossible to defeat the Zionists, it was wiser to co-operate with them. Others were committed nationalists who believed that staying on the land was paramount and that working for and co-operating with the Zionists was the strategy that would enable them to stay on the land. Others were driven to collaborate with the Zionists or with the British out of their intense hatred for Hajj Amin al-Husayni.

Cohen sees the Arabs of Mandatory Palestine as being split between two positions. There were those who agreed with Husayni that all of Palestine must remain Arab and the Zionists must be fought, and there were those who argued that the Zionists were too powerful to be defeated and so the path of wisdom lay in some sort of co-existence.

According to Cohen, the Husayni clan tried to rid itself of opposition beginning in the 1920s. In 1929, Sheikh Musa Hadeib was murdered near the Jaffa Gate in Jerusalem. In the 1929 Palestine riots, Husayni spread the falsehood that the Jews intended to tear down the Al Aqsa Mosque and the Dome of the Rock, a shrine on the Temple Mount. Over the course of the next decade, Husayni had 1000 Arabs murdered, 500 in 1938 alone. In 1939, the Husaynis were paying 100 Palestine pounds to assassins who murdered important "traitors", 25 pounds for petty "traitors" and 10 pounds for murdering a Jew.

Husyani's methods drove many Arabs to side with and even to fight alongside the Zionists. Perhaps the most shocking allegation in the book is that Husayni often put his own position in Palestinian politics above the interests of the Palestinian nation, most crucially so in 1939. The result was that Husayni rejected the British White Paper of 1939, which reneged on the promise of a Jewish homeland made in the Balfour Declaration and effectively promised the Palestinian Arabs majority rule and independence within a decade. According to Cohen, Husayni rejected the offer because Britain did not guarantee his position as ruler of the Palestinian Arab state that it proposed to create.

== Critical acclaim ==
Writing in The Nation, Neve Gordon calls Army of Shadows "groundbreaking" for exposing a "particularly nefarious side of the Israeli-Palestinian conflict," the manipulation of paid Arab collaborators by Zionist organizations. When the book came out, he says it caused a stir among Jewish and Arab intellectuals since both sides found the evidence presented by Cohen unpalatable.

Benny Morris commented on Cohen's view of the integral role of Islam in the Palestinian national identity: "From the first, the nationalism of Palestine's Arabs was blatantly religious. Almost all the 'nationalist' statements Cohen quotes were couched in religious or semi- religious terms. We are dealing here with an Islamic nationalism." In The New Republic he wrote: "His perspective—and this is one of his book's strengths—is neither pro-Palestinian nor anti-Palestinian, neither pro-Zionist nor anti-Zionist. Cohen argues—with Talleyrand, who famously quipped that "treason is a matter of dates"—that "treason is ultimately a social construct. Definitions vary with circumstances," and "collaboration" is "in the eye of the beholder." So Cohen leaves "the moral and political judgment" to his readers".

The most notable aspect of the book according to Stephen Schwartz, writing in the Weekly Standard, is the idea that some Palestinian Arabs refused to take up arms against Israel in 1948 out of hatred for Husayni. According to Cohen, Palestinian Arabs were in no hurry to join the battle: "Only a minority of Arabs were involved in offensive activities, this unwillingness to fight was frequently buttressed by agreements with Jews in nearby settlements."
