= Leen Ritmeyer =

Dutch-born archaeological architect

Leen Ritmeyer (Hebrew: לין ריטמאייר; born 1945) is a Dutch-born archaeological architect who currently lives and works in Wales, after having spent 22 years (1967–89) in Jerusalem.

== Career ==
Ritmeyer holds an M.A. in Conservation Studies from the Institute of Advanced Architectural Studies, University of York, England, and a Ph.D. from the University of Manchester, England.

Beginning in 1973, Ritmeyer served for 4 years as official architect of the archaeological dig at the Western Wall and Southern Wall of the Temple Mount directed by Benjamin Mazar, and 10 years in the Jewish Quarter Excavations of the Old City of Jerusalem, directed by Nahman Avigad.

In Gershom Gorenberg's words, "[w]hen archeologists speak today of solid scientific research on the Temple's location, they’re most likely to refer to Leen Ritmeyer", referring to his work on the Temple Mount in Jerusalem. He presented solid arguments based on archaeological evidence collected over at least a century of research for the location of Solomon's Temple, the emplacement of the Ark of the Covenant on the Foundation Stone, and the location of the platform as extended in the First Temple period, probably during the time of Hezekiah described as a square of 500 cubits in Mishnah Middot 2.1. He has demonstrated that one of the steps leading to the Dome of the Rock is actually the top of a remaining stone course of the pre-Herodian Western Wall of the Temple Mount platform.

Ritmeyer is known for his architectural models of the buildings of ancient Jerusalem. His models of the historical Jewish Temples have been exhibited at museums including the Yeshiva University Museum in New York and the Siegfried H. Horn Museum at Andrews University, Michigan.

== Works ==
Ritmeyer has published several books, some together with his wife, Kathleen, including:

- Understanding the Holy Temple Jesus Knew (2017)
- Understanding the Holy Temple of the Old Testament (2016)
- Jerusalem the Temple Mount (2015)
- The Quest: Revealing the Temple Mount in Jerusalem (2006)
- Secrets of Jerusalem's Temple Mount, Updated and Enlarged Edition (2006)
- Jerusalem in the Time of Nehemiah (2005/2014)
- Jerusalem in the Year 30 AD (2004/2014)
- Jerusalem at the Time of Jesus (2004)
- The Ritual of the Temple in the Time of Christ (2002/2015)
- Secrets of Jerusalem's Temple Mount (1998)
- From Sinai to Jerusalem: The Wanderings of the Holy Ark (2000)
- The Temple and the Rock (1996)

== See also ==
- Archaeology of Israel
- Biblical archaeology
