= Hillel Cohen =

Israeli historian (born 1961)

Hillel Cohen-Bar
- הלל כהן-בר
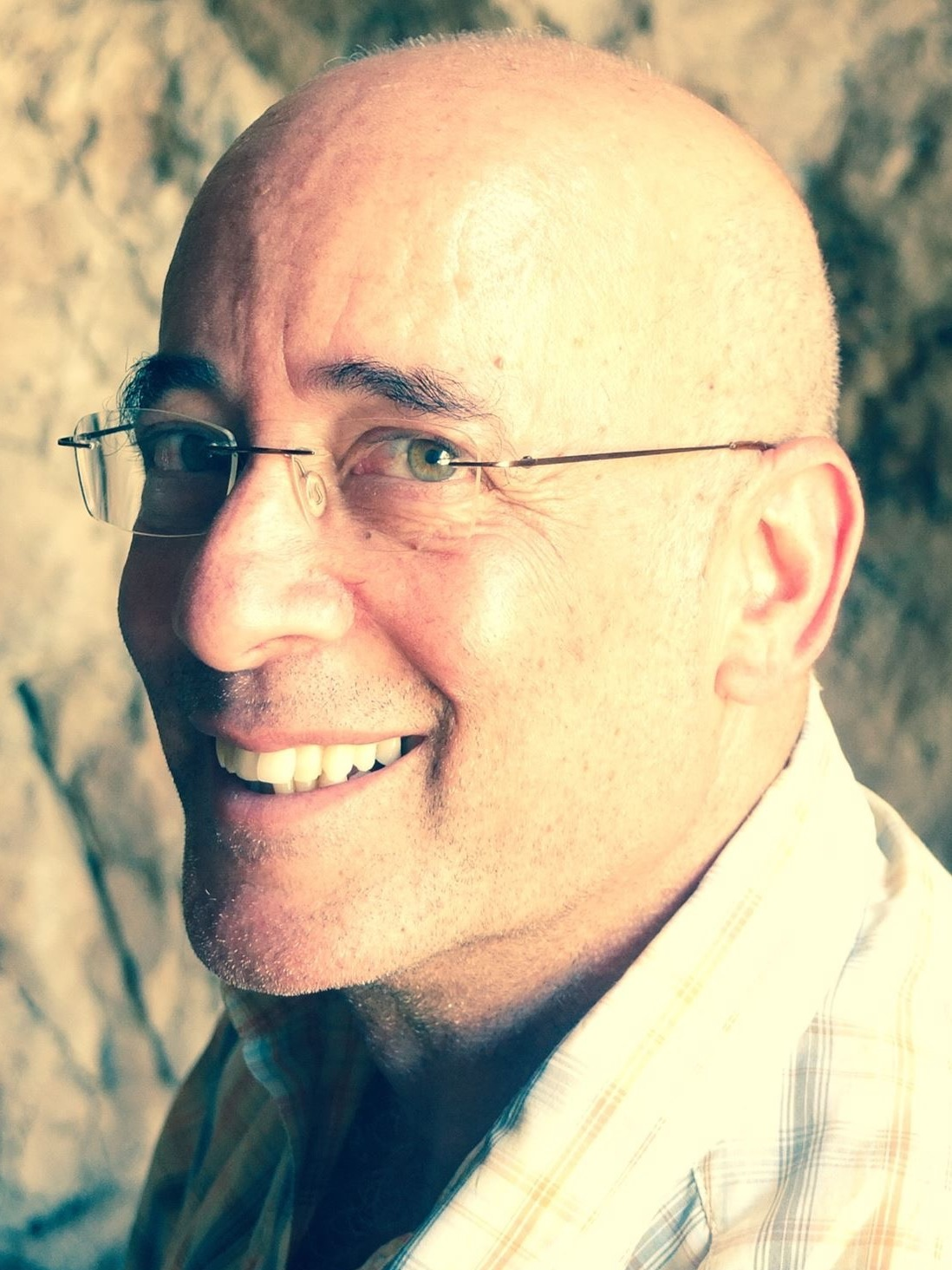
- Born: 5 October 1961 (age 65); Jerusalem, Israel
- Occupations: Scholar, Professor
- Employer: Hebrew University of Jerusalem
- Known for: Research on Jewish-Arab relations, Palestinian internal refugees, 1948 war
- Notable work: Kikar Hashuk Reka, Army of Shadows
- Title: Head of the Cherrick Center for the Study of Zionism and the State of Israel

Hillel Cohen-Bar (Hebrew: הלל כהן-בר; born in Jerusalem, 5 October 1961) is an Israeli scholar who studies and writes about Jewish-Arab relations in Palestine/Israel. He is an associated professor at the Department of Islam and Middle East Studies at the Hebrew University of Jerusalem, and the head of the Cherrick Center for the Study of Zionism and the State of Israel at that university.

== Journalism and academic career ==
Cohen is familiar with East Jerusalem, the topic of his book, Kikar Hashuk Reka (The Marketplace is Empty or: The Rise and Fall of Arab Jerusalem), because of the years he spent as a correspondent for East Jerusalem affairs for the Israeli weekly Kol Ha'ir. He published extensively on the Palestinian internal refugees and on the 1948 war. Two of his books deal with Palestinian collaborators and the Israeli security agencies using methodology that can be described as history-from-below. The Jerusalem Post calls his books "an accessible mixture of academic research and vivid journalistic reporting. Cohen manages to show empathy when relating human issues, but maintains a professional distance regarding events." In his review of Cohen's book Army of Shadows, Benny Morris lauds the book as important and learned, and praises it for presenting an objective view of 'collaboration'".

== Published works ==
- The Present Absentee: Palestinian Refugees in Israel Since 1948 (Hebrew 2000, Arabic 2003)
- Good Arabs: The Israeli Security Services and the Israeli Arabs ערבים טובים (Hebrew 2006, English 2010)
- Army of Shadows, Palestinian Collaboration with Zionism, 1917–1948 (Hebrew 2004, English 2008, German 2026)
- The Rise and Fall of Arab Jerusalem (Hebrew 2007, English 2011)
- Year Zero of the Arab-Israeli Conflict 1929 תרפ"ט שנת האפס בסכסוך היהודי ערבי (Hebrew 2013, English 2015)
- Enemies, a Love Story; Mizrahi-Arab-Ashkenazi Relations Since the Dawn of Zionism (Hebrew 2021, English 2025)
