= Rzeszów =

City in Podkarpackie Voivodeship, Poland

- City county
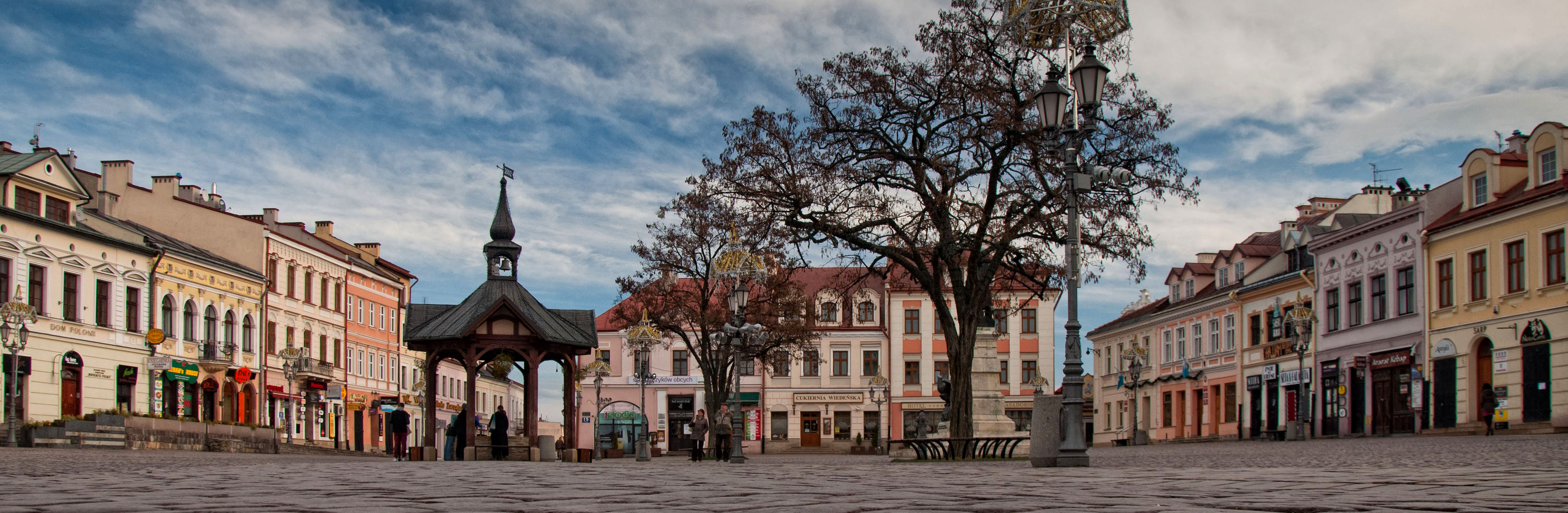
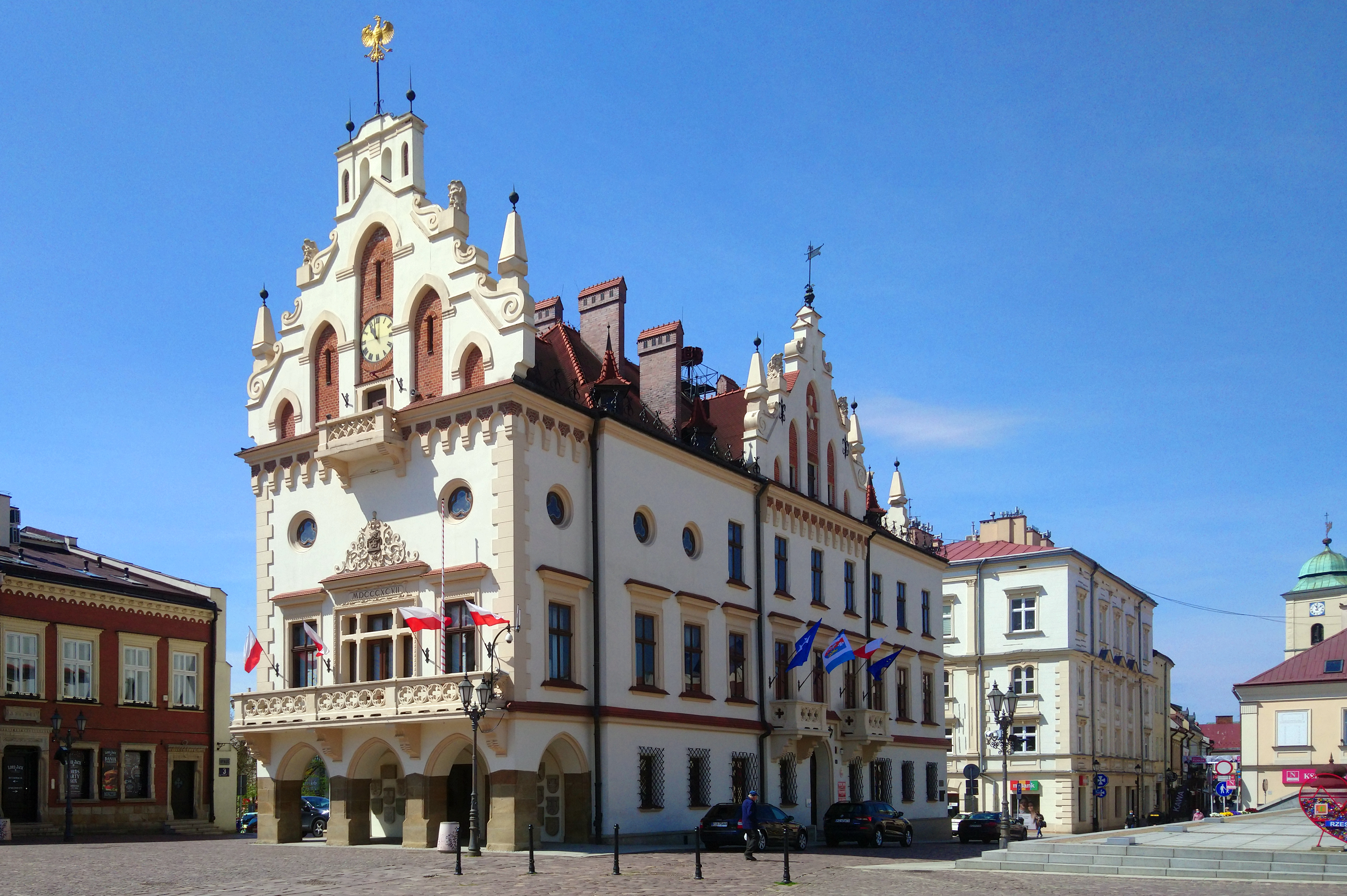
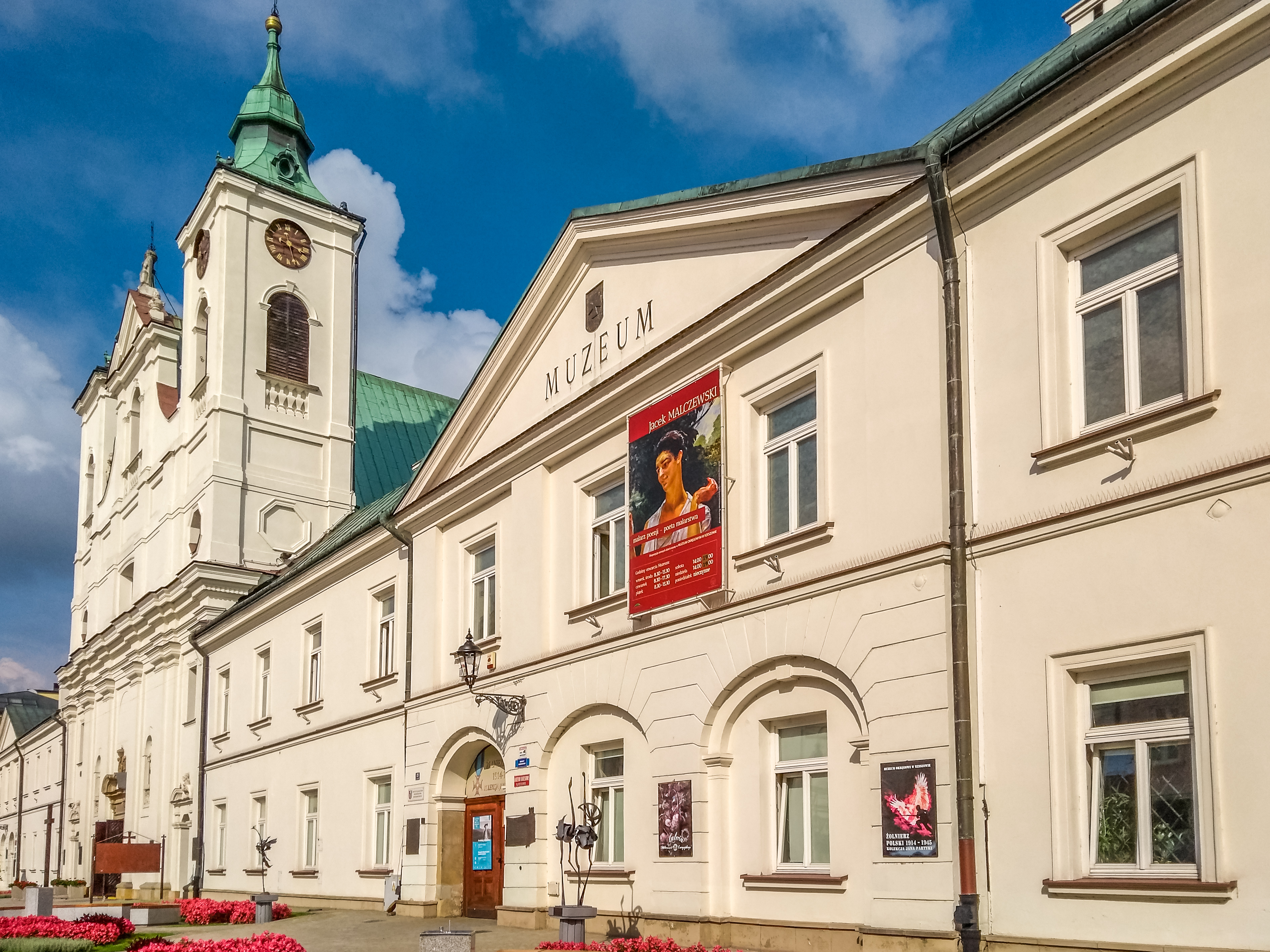
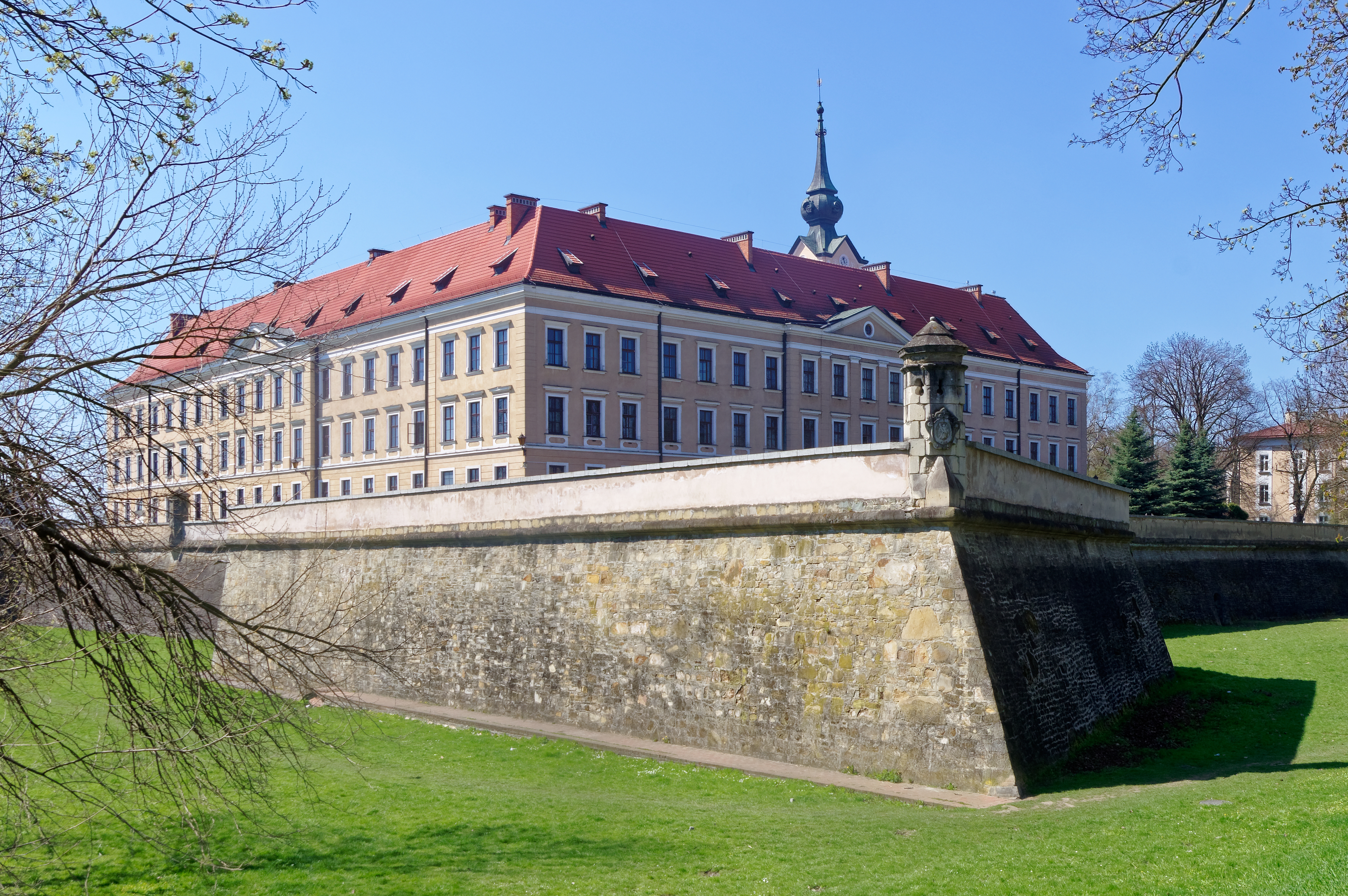
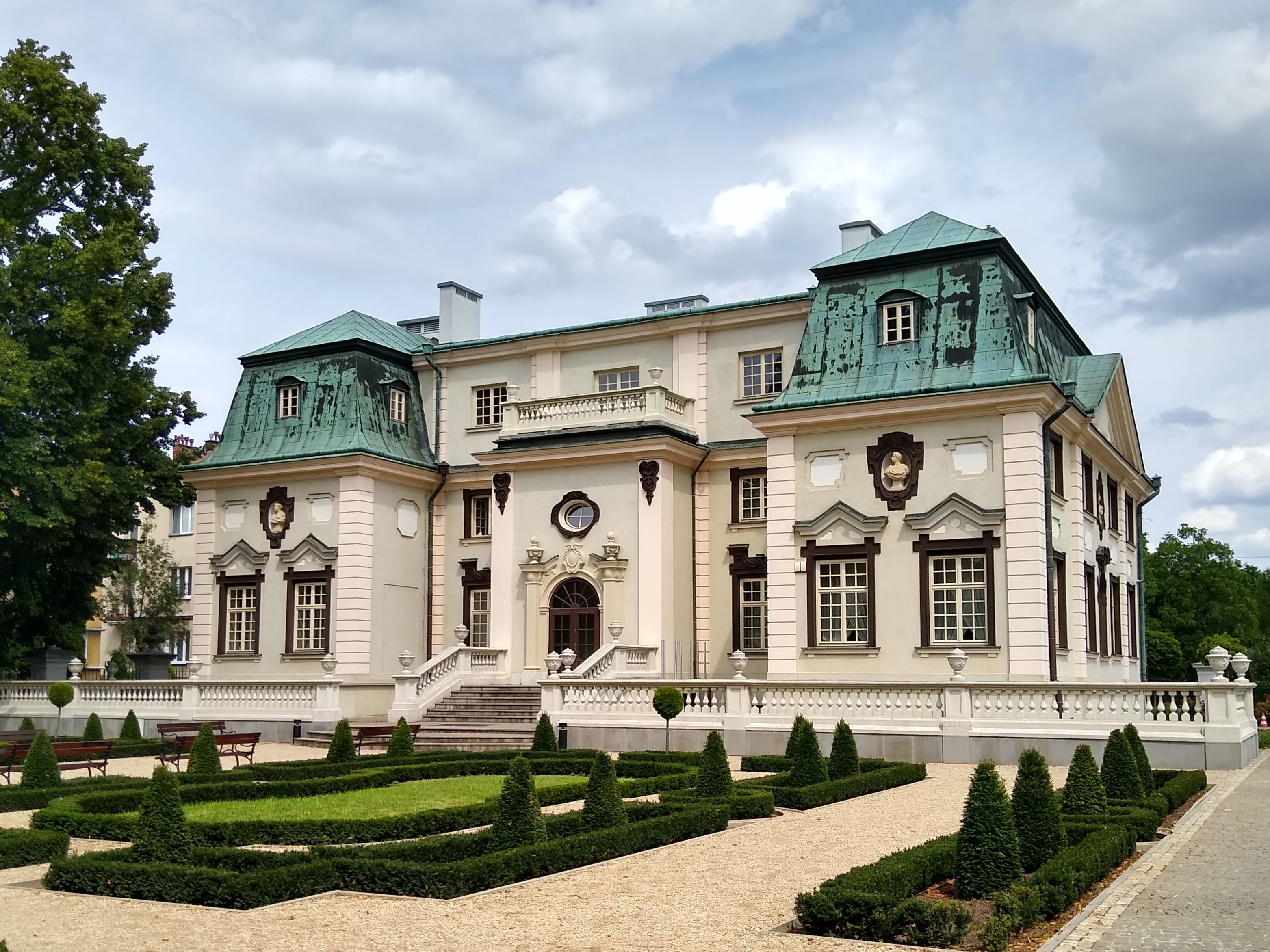
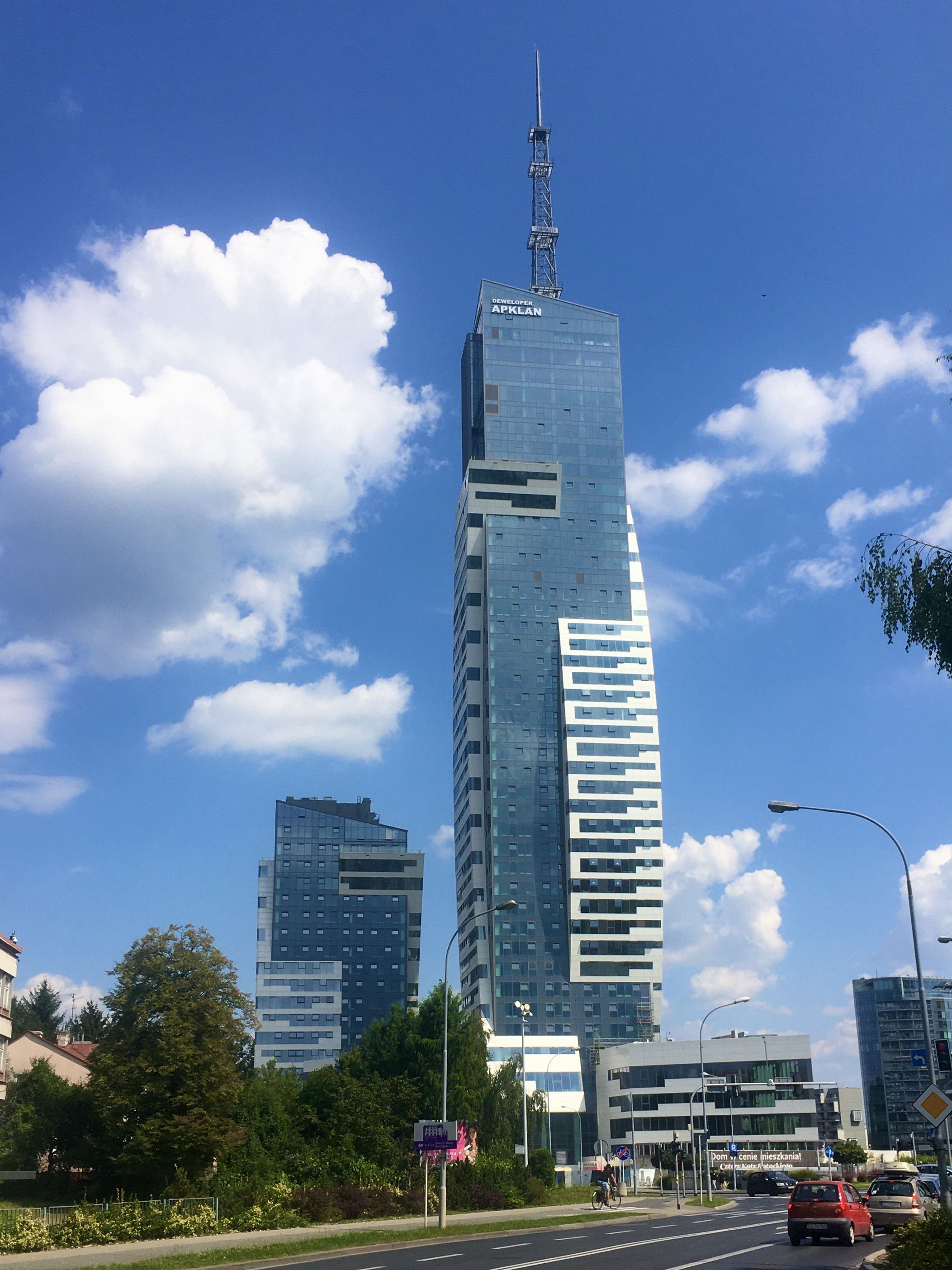
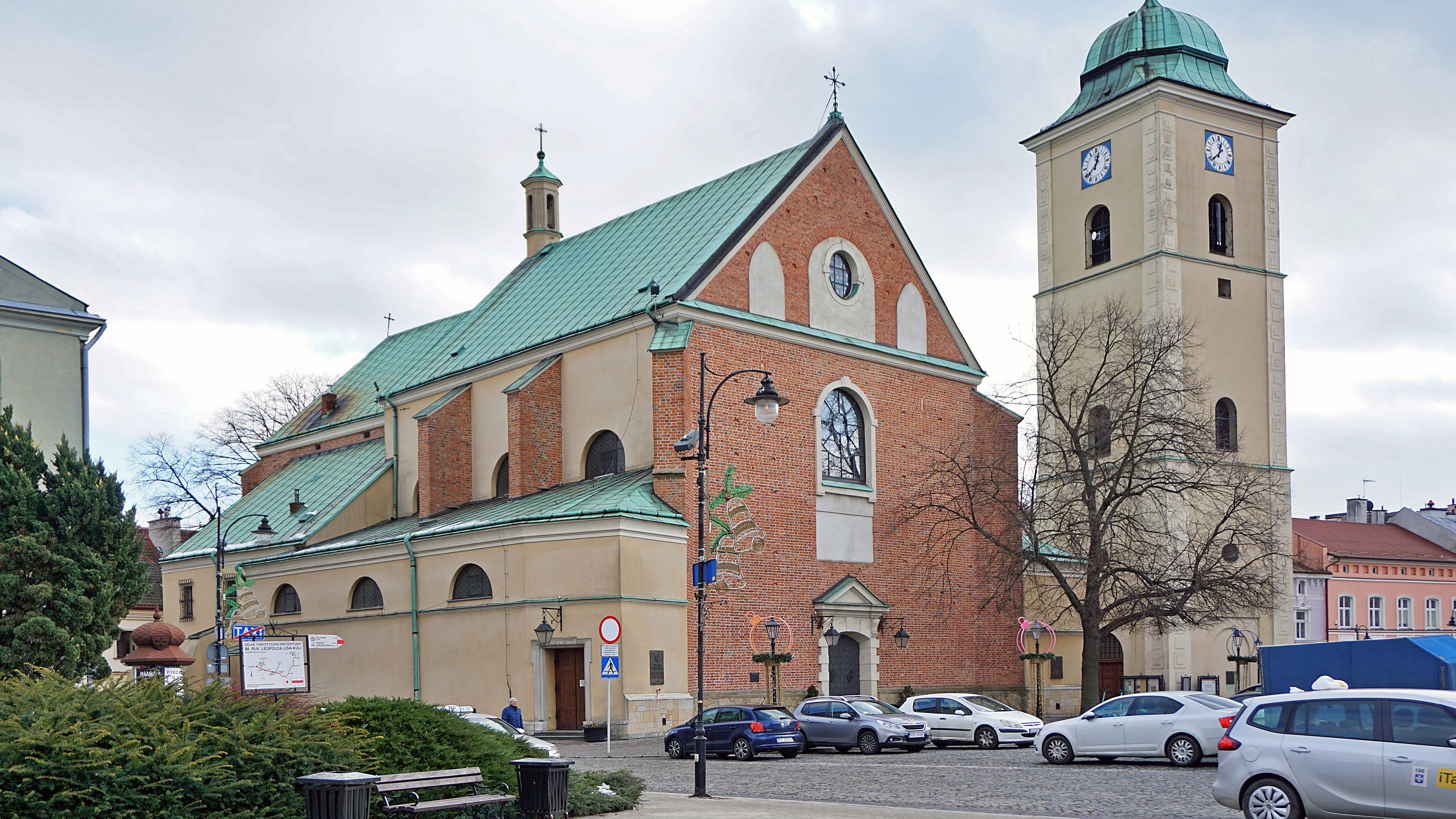
- Main Market Square City Hall Regional Museum Rzeszów Castle Lubomirski Palace Olszynki Park St. Adalbert Church

- Flag Coat of arms

- Location within Poland
- Coordinates: 50°2′N 22°0′E
- Country: Poland
- Voivodeship: Subcarpathian
- County: city county
- Town rights: 1354

Government
  - Body: Rzeszów City Council
  - Mayor: Konrad Fijołek (L)

Area
  - Total: 129.01 km^{2} (49.81 sq mi)

Population (31 December 2025)
  - Total: 199,436 ▲ (14th)
  - Density: 1,546/km^{2} (4,000/sq mi)
- Demonym(s): rzeszowianin (male) rzeszowianka (female) (pl)
- Time zone: UTC+1 (CET)
  - Summer (DST): UTC+2 (CEST)
- Postal code: 35-001 to 35–959
- Area code: +48 17
- Car plates: RZ
- Primary airport: Rzeszów–Jasionka Airport
- Climate: Dfb
- Website: erzeszow.pl

Rzeszów (Note: Polish: [ˈʐɛʂuf]; US: /ˈʒɛʃuːf, -ʃʊf/ ZHESH-oof, -uuf, Latin: Resovia; Yiddish: ריישא, romanized: Raisha; German: Resche) is the largest city in southeastern Poland, situated on both banks of the Wisłok River in the Sandomierz Basin. It is the capital of the Subcarpathian Voivodeship and the region's principal administrative, academic and economic centre. The city had 199,436 inhabitants at the end of 2025.

The city's history dates to the Middle Ages, when King Casimir III the Great granted it town rights in 1354. Rzeszów prospered through trade between Lesser Poland, Red Ruthenia and the Carpathian region. Following the First Partition of Poland in 1772, it came under Habsburg rule before returning to Poland in 1918. Its transformation into an industrial centre began in 1937 with the establishment of aircraft-engine manufacturing under the Central Industrial Region programme.

Today, Rzeszów is the centre of Poland's aerospace industry and the headquarters of Aviation Valley, the national aerospace cluster comprising more than 200 companies across southeastern Poland. The city is home to Pratt & Whitney's aircraft-engine manufacturing and research facilities and Boeing's engineering office. Rzeszów is also the headquarters of Asseco Poland, which leads the Asseco Group, Europe's sixth-largest software producer. Its principal universities are the University of Rzeszów and Rzeszów University of Technology.

Since 2022, Rzeszów–Jasionka Airport has become the main international logistics hub for Western aid to Ukraine. The city's notable natives include four-time Academy Award winner Fred Zinnemann, influential theatre director Jerzy Grotowski and jazz trumpeter Tomasz Stańko.

== History ==
In the area of Rzeszów, the first early European modern humans appeared in the late Paleolithic Age; archaeologists have excavated a tool made in that period at site Rzeszów 25. In the mid-6th century BC, the first farmers came to the area of the city, most likely through the Moravian Gate. Later on, Rzeszów was a settlement of the Lusatian culture, which was followed by the Przeworsk culture.

In the 7th century, the first Slavs appeared in the area, which is confirmed by numerous archaeological findings. Most probably, Rzeszów was then inhabited by the Vistulans. In the 10th century, it became part of the emerging Duchy of Poland. Sometime between 11th and 13th century the town was conquered and subsequently annexed by the East Slavic Ruthenians from the weakened and fragmented Polish state (see Testament of Bolesław III Wrymouth).

Polish rulers of the Piast dynasty recaptured Rzeszów in 1264. In Tarnów, there was a meeting of Prince Bolesław V the Chaste, and Prince Daniel of Kingdom of Galicia–Volhynia, during which both sides agreed that the border would go between Rzeszów and Czudec (Rzeszów belonged to Kingdom of Galicia–Volhynia, while Czudec and Strzyżów to Lesser Poland).

After the reunification of Poland following the fragmentation period, Rzeszów remained in Ruthenian hands until 1340, when King Casimir III the Great eventually recaptured the area, inviting his knights to govern the re-acquired land. According to some sources, at that time Rzeszów was inhabited by the Walddeutsche, and was called Rishof (during World War II, the Germans renamed it Reichshof). The town was granted Magdeburg rights, it had a parish church, a market place and a cemetery, and its total area was some 1.5 km^{2} (0.58 sq mi). Magdeburg rights entitled Rzeszów's local authorities to punish criminals, build fortifications and tax merchants.

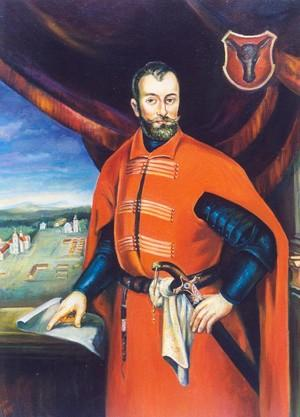
Nobleman Mikołaj Spytek Ligęza greatly contributed to the city's importance

In 1458 Rzeszów was burned by the Vlachs and the Tatars. In 1502 the Tatars destroyed it again. Earlier, in 1427, Rzeszów had burned to the ground in a big fire, but the town recovered after these events, thanks to its favorable location on the main West – East (Kraków – Lwów) and North – South (Lublin – Slovakia) trade routes. In the 15th century the first Jews settled in Rzeszów.

The 16th century was the time of prosperity for the town, especially when Rzeszów belonged to Mikołaj Spytek Ligęza (since the 1580s), who invested in infrastructure, building a castle, a Bernardine church and a monastery. Rzeszów then had some 2,500 inhabitants, with a rapidly growing Jewish community. The town was granted several royal rights, including the privilege to organise several markets a year. At that time, Rzeszów finally grew beyond its medieval borders, marked by fortifications.

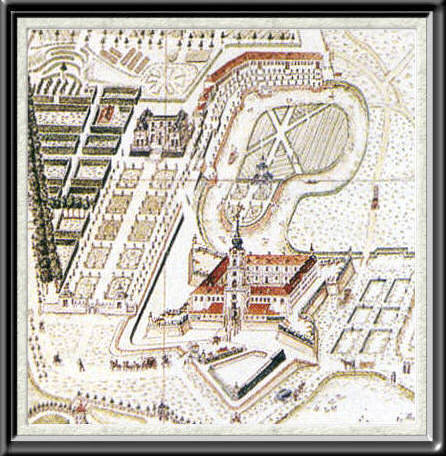
Rzeszów Castle with surroundings, by K.H. Wiedemann, 1762

In 1638 Rzeszów passed into the hands of the powerful and wealthy Lubomirski family, becoming the center of its vast properties. At first, the town prospered and in 1658, the first college was opened there, which now operates as Konarski Secondary School. The period of prosperity ended, and furthermore, there were several fires and wars, which destroyed the town.

Rzeszów was first captured by the Swedes during The Deluge, then by the troops of George II Rákóczi leading to the Treaty of Radnot. During the Great Northern War, the Swedes again captured Rzeszów, in 1702, then several different armies occupied the town, ransacking it and destroying houses.

In the mid-eighteenth century, the town's population was composed of Poles (Roman Catholics) and Yiddish Jews in almost equal numbers (50.1% and 49.8%, respectively).

=== Rzeszów under Austrian rule ===
In 1772, following the First Partition of Poland, Rzeszów became part of the Austrian Empire, to which it belonged for 146 years. In the late 18th century, Rzeszów had 3,000 inhabitants. By the mid-19th century, the population grew to around 7,500, with 40% of them Jewish. In 1858, the Galician Railway of Archduke Charles Louis reached Rzeszów, which resulted in further development of the town. In 1888 the first telephone lines were opened, in 1900 – gas street lamps, and in 1911 – a power plant and water system. The population grew to 23,000, with half of the inhabitants being Jews. A number of modern buildings were constructed, most of them in Secession style.

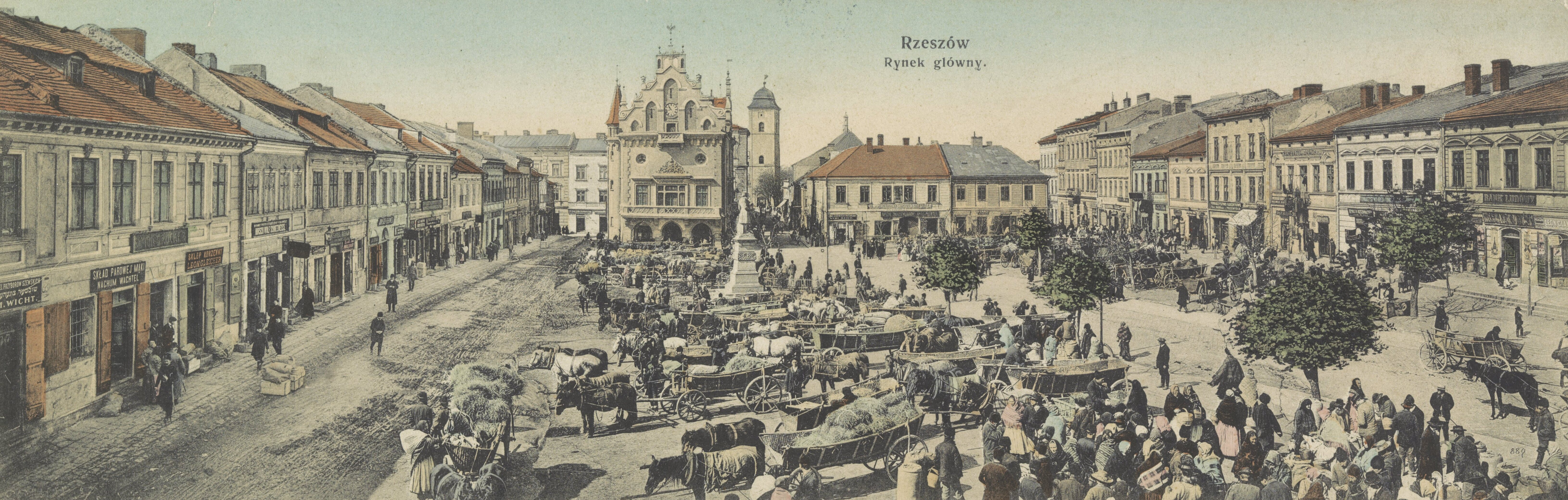
Market Square in 1908

During World War I, several battles took place near the town. Rzeszów was home to a large garrison of the Austro-Hungarian Army, and in the city of Przemyśl, located nearby, there was a major fortress. During the Battle of Galicia in the late summer of 1914, Russian troops moved towards Rzeszów, and on 21 September, they captured it. The first Russian occupation lasted only 16 days, ending after an attack by the Austrians, on 4 October.

Under Russian pressure, the Austrians were unable to keep the town, and on 7 November, the Russians again appeared in Rzeszów. In the late fall of 1914, the front line was established between Tarnów and Gorlice, and Rzeszów became an important center of the Imperial Russian Army, with large magazines of food and ammunition located there. The Russian occupation lasted until May 1915. After the Russians were pushed out of Galicia, Rzeszów remained outside the area of military activity. The Austrian administration returned, but wartime reality and damage to the town had a negative effect on the population, and the quality of life deteriorated.

=== Interwar period ===
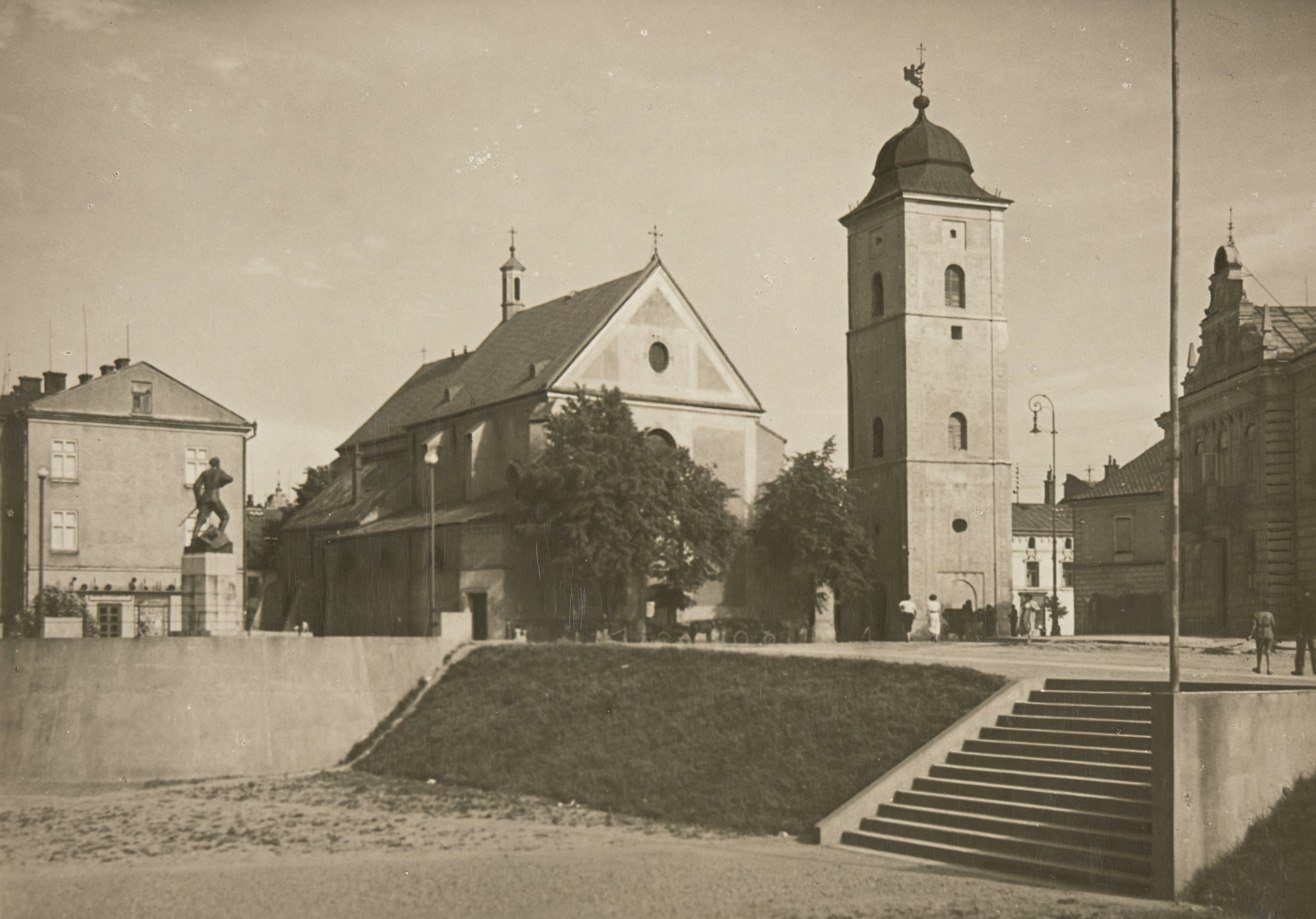
Plac Farny in 1938

On 12 October 1918, Rzeszów's mayor, together with the town council, sent a message to Warsaw, announcing loyalty to the independent Second Polish Republic. On November 1, after clashes with German and Austrian troops, Rzeszów was liberated, and the next day, mayor Roman Krogulski took a pledge of allegiance to the reborn Polish state. During World War I some 200 residents of Rzeszów died, rail infrastructure was destroyed, as well as approximately 60 houses.

In 1920, Rzeszów became capital of a county in the Lwów Voivodeship. The town grew, and the creation of the Central Industrial Region had an enormous impact on Rzeszów. It became a major center of the defense industry, with PZL Rzeszów opening there in 1937. It was also home to a large garrison of the Polish Army, with the 10th Motorized Cavalry Brigade stationed there. In 1939, Rzeszów had 40,000 inhabitants, but its dynamic growth was stopped by the Invasion of Poland and outbreak of World War II.

=== Second World War ===
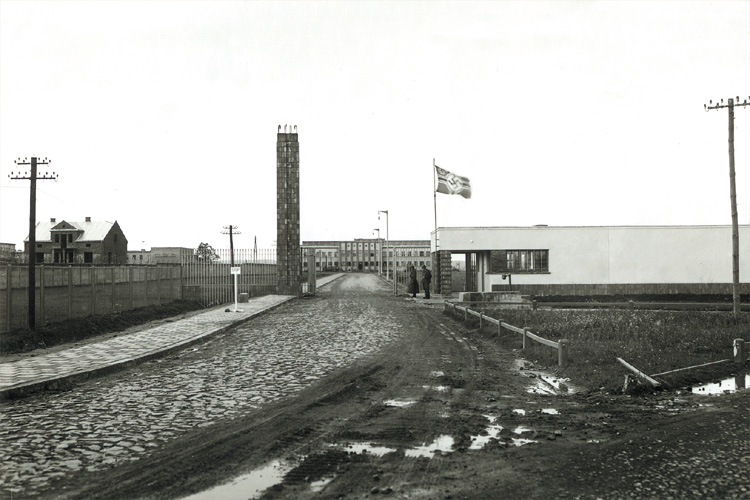
Aircraft engine factory during German occupation

On 6–8 September 1939, Rzeszów was bombed by the Luftwaffe. The town was defended by the 10th Cavalry Brigade and 24th Uhlan Regiment from Kraśnik. The German attack began on 8 September in the afternoon, and the Wehrmacht entered Rzeszów the next morning. The Einsatzgruppe I entered the city to commit crimes against the population, and its members co-formed the local German police. Under German occupation, Rzeszów, renamed into Reichshof, became part of the General Government.

The occupiers established a Nazi prison, in which they imprisoned over 1,100 Poles, especially the intelligentsia, arrested in the region between October 1939 and June 1940, during the Intelligenzaktion. Some people were eventually released, some were deported to prisons in Kraków and Tarnów, while many were executed at the prison yard. On 2 November 1939, the Germans carried out mass arrests of local priests and Bernardine friars, and afterwards, they also carried out executions of Polish intelligentsia at the local Bernardine monastery.

Persecution of Polish intelligentsia was continued with the AB-Aktion, and on 27 June 1940, 104 Poles from the local prison were exterminated in the forest of Lubzina. In 1941, the Germans established a ghetto, whose Jewish inhabitants were later murdered in Bełżec extermination camp (for more information see The Holocaust below).

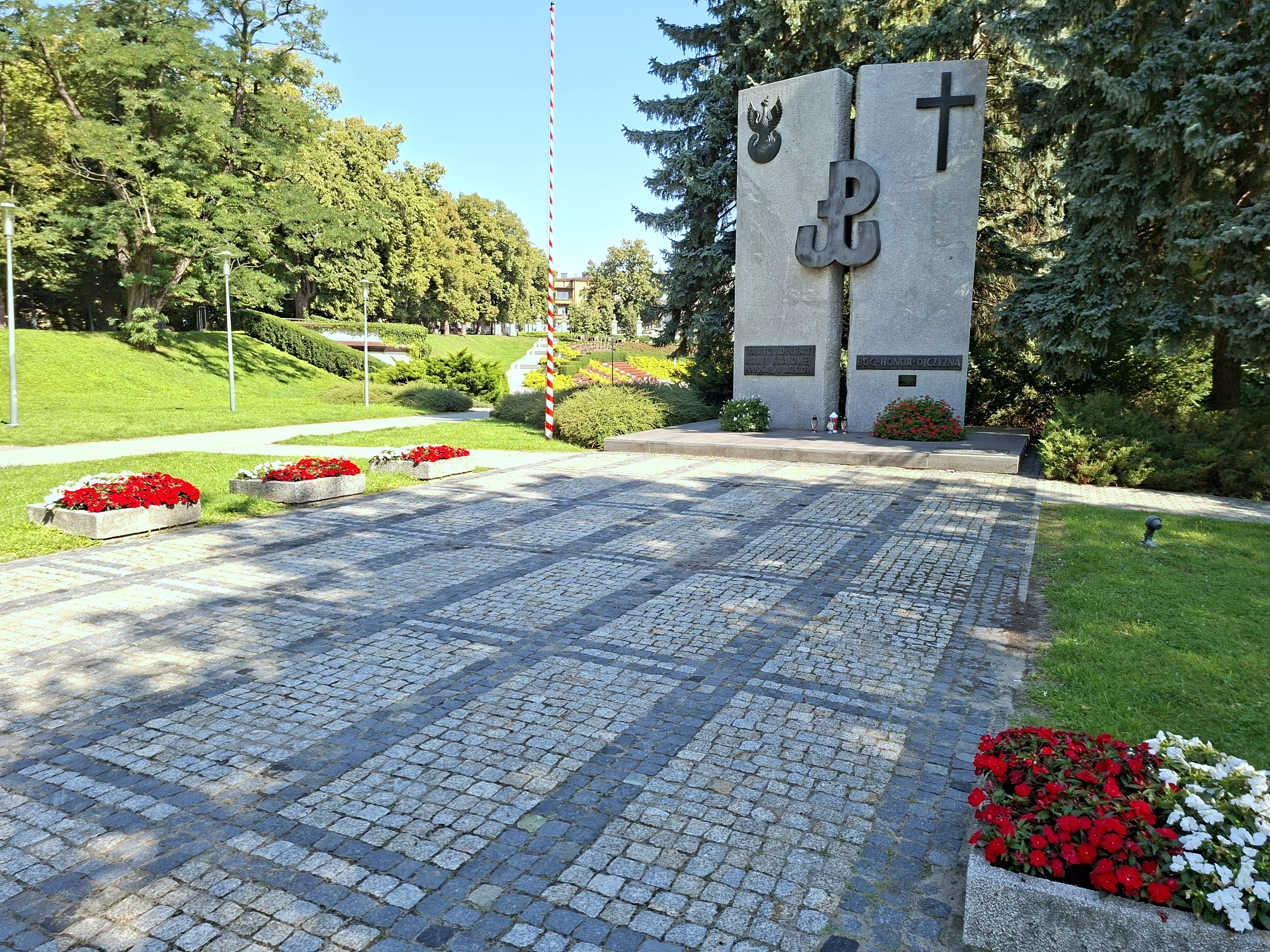
Home Army Monument

During the war, Rzeszów was a main center of the Polish Underground State, with the Rzeszów Inspectorate of the Home Army covering several counties. On 25 May, during Action Kosba, Home Army soldiers killed the Gestapo henchmen Friederich Pottenbaum and Hans Flaschke on a Rzeszów street. In the summer of 1944, during Operation Tempest, units of the Home Army attacked German positions in the town, and on 2 August, Rzeszów was in the hands of the Home Army.

Polish authorities loyal to the Polish government-in-exile tried to negotiate with the Soviets, but without success. The NKVD immediately opened a prison in the cellars of the Rzeszów Castle, sending there a number of Home Army soldiers. On the night of 7/9 October 1944, a Home Army unit under Łukasz Ciepliński attacked the castle, trying to release 400 inmates kept there. The attack failed, and Ciepliński was captured and subsequently executed in 1951.

==== The Holocaust ====
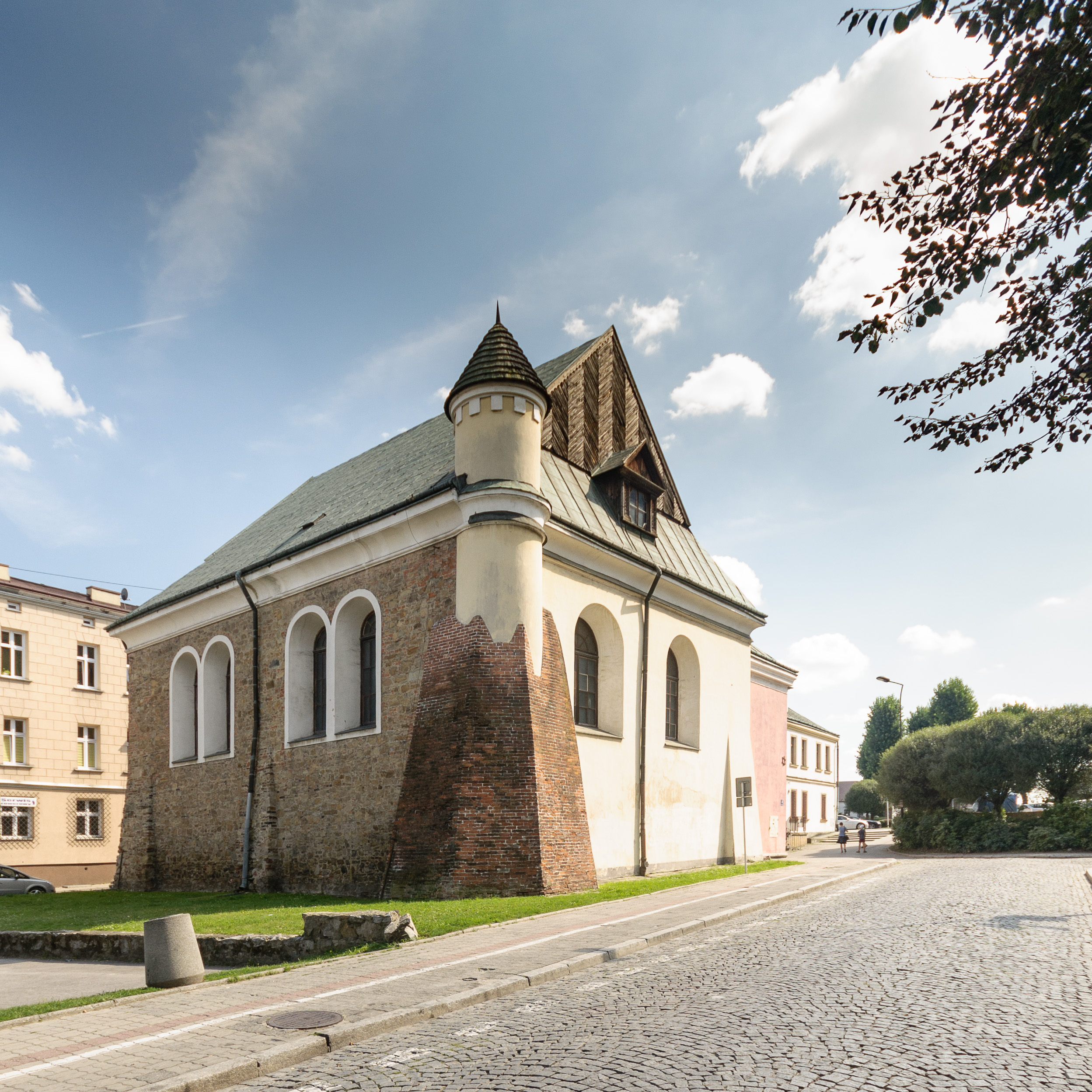
Old Town Synagogue

Before the outbreak of World War II, the Jews of Rzeszów numbered 14,000, more than one-third of the total population. The town was occupied by the German Army on 10 September 1939 and was renamed "Reichshof". German persecution of the Jews began almost immediately. By the end of 1939, there were 10 forced labour camps in the Rzeszów region and many Jews became slave labourers. Jews were forced to live in the Gestapo-controlled ghetto.

Many Jews managed to flee to Soviet-occupied eastern Poland. By June 1940, the number of Jews in Rzeszów had decreased to 11,800, of whom 7,800 were pre-war residents of the city; the rest were from the surrounding villages. As in all Jewish ghettos in German-occupied Poland, life in the ghetto was impossible and hundreds died of malnutrition and disease. During the war, some 20,000 Jews were murdered in the ghetto in Rzeszów. This number includes thousands who were sent to Rzeszów only to be deported or murdered soon after arrival.

In the summer of 1942, hundreds were murdered in forests near Rzeszów. Hundreds more were sent to Belzec to be immediately gassed. Later in 1942, another round up sent nearly 1,500 children to their deaths and their parents to labor camps. In final "Aktions" in the fall of 1943, most Jewish slave labour was transported in Holocaust trains to the newly reopened Szebnie concentration camp. A month later, on 5 November 1943, some 2,800 Jews were deported to Auschwitz and murdered. Most of those who had been sent to labor camps were eventually murdered there or in an extermination camp.

Of Rzeszów's 14,000 Jews, only 100 survived the war, whether in Rzeszów itself, hiding all over Poland, or in various camps. The secret Polish Council to Aid Jews, "Żegota", established by the Polish resistance movement, operated in the region. Cases are also known of local Poles who were captured and either executed or sent to concentration camps for rescuing and aiding Jews. Poles who saved Jews in other places in the region were also temporarily imprisoned in the local castle or sentenced to death by the local German court. After the war, an additional 600 Rzeszów Jews returned from the Soviet Union. Almost all of them subsequently left Rzeszów and Poland.

=== Postwar and present times ===
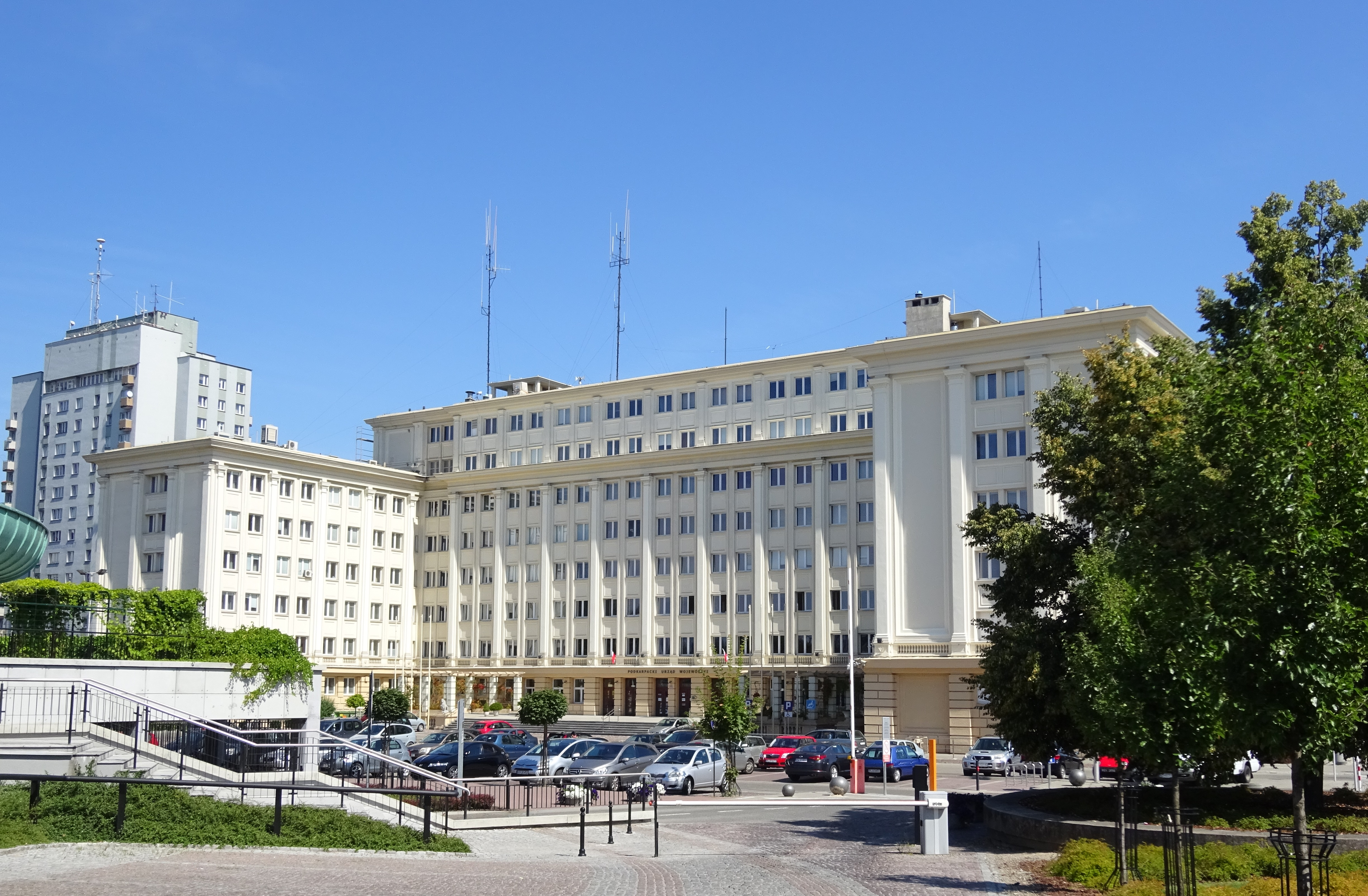
Subcarpathian Voivodeship Office (Podkarpacki Urząd Wojewódzki) in Rzeszów

After rumors of the murder of a Christian girl in the city surfaced, on 1 June 1945, or after the mutilated body of 9-year-old Bronisława Mendoń was found in the basement of a tenement building largely inhabited by Holocaust survivors on 11 June 1945, the Polish Communist Citizens' Militia arrested all of Rzeszów's remaining Jews, or the Jewish inhabitants of the area and some Jews transiting through the railway station, and led them through the city amidst an angry crowd, while at the same time looting the homes of the arrested Jews. All of the arrested people were released the same day, but the main suspect, who was linked to the crime through a sheet of paper from Mendoń's notebook and bloodstains in his flat, was arrested on June 14 and held until September. As a result, more than 200 Jews fled Rzeszów, so that a restoration of Jewish life in the city after 1945 failed to materialize.

On 7 July 1945, Rzeszów became capital of the newly created Rzeszów Voivodeship, which consisted of western counties of prewar Lwów Voivodeship, and several counties of prewar Kraków Voivodeship. This decision had a major impact on the city, as it quickly grew. New offices of the regional government were built, and in 1951, several neighbouring villages were included within the city limits of Rzeszów, and the area of the city grew to 39 km^{2} (15 sq mi).

In 1971 and 1977, further villages were included within the city limits. In early 1981, Rzeszów was a main center of farmer protests, who occupied local offices for fifty days, which resulted in the signing of the Rzeszów – Ustrzyki Agreement, and the creation of Rural Solidarity.

In 1991 Pope John Paul II visited Rzeszów. During the celebrations in which nearly 1,000,000 people participated, the pope beatified Bishop Józef Sebastian Pelczar, former bishop of Przemyśl. On 25 March 1992 Pope John Paul II established the new Diocese of Rzeszów. The city of Rzeszów became the administrative center of the new Diocese and the Church of the Sacred Heart became the new city cathedral.

On 1 January 1999, the city became the capital of Podkarpackie Voivodeship. Its population grew to 170,000, and area to 9,143 km^{2} (3,530 sq mi). In 2004, Rzeszów hosted the Central European Olympiad in Informatics (CEOI). In 2017–2021, Rzeszów's city limits were greatly expanded by including the villages of Bzianka, Miłocin and Pogwizdów Nowy. The area of Rzeszów increased to over 120 square kilometres and more than 188,000 inhabitants.

In 2022, following the February Russian invasion of Ukraine, Rzeszów became a "main artery" and hub for resupply of military material being transshipped to Ukraine from a number of countries of the Western alliance, including Sweden, Turkey, Germany, the U.S., and the Czech Republic. Also, the Rzeszów–Jasionka Airport, which services Rzeszów, hosted American MIM-104 Patriot surface-to-air missile batteries.

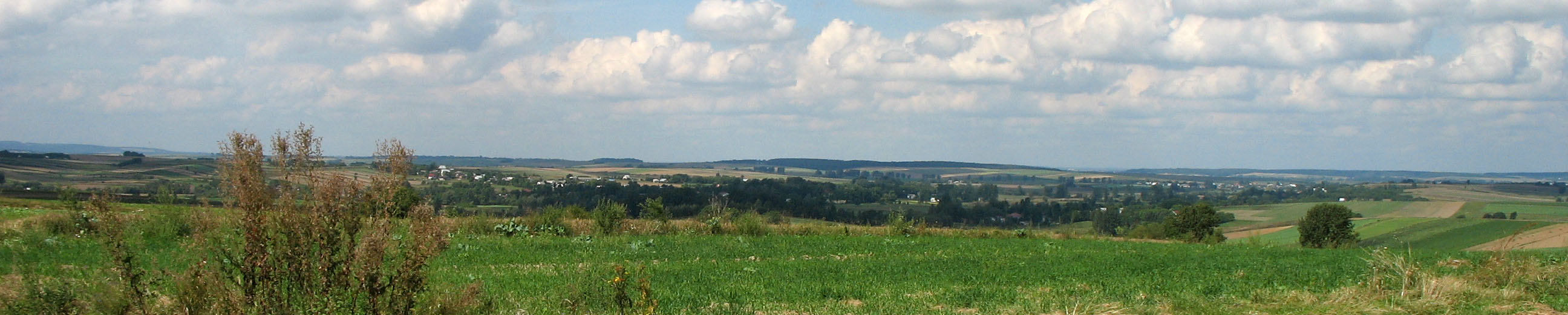
Countryside surrounding Rzeszów

== Demographics ==
Historical population

Year	Pop.	±%
1790	3,336	—
1816	4,536	+36.0%
1824	4,779	+5.4%
1860	7,342	+53.6%
1880	11,166	+52.1%
1890	11,953	+7.0%
1900	15,010	+25.6%
1910	23,688	+57.8%
1921	24,942	+5.3%
1931	26,902	+7.9%

Year	Pop.	±%
1939	41,300	+53.5%
1950	28,133	−31.9%
1960	62,526	+122.3%
1970	83,105	+32.9%
1978	112,684	+35.6%
1988	148,560	+31.8%
2002	160,376	+8.0%
2011	179,386	+11.9%
2021	195,871	+9.2%
2025	199,436	+1.8%

According to GUS data, as of January 2026, Rzeszów had 199 436 inhabitants. In contrast to other cities close to the size of Rzeszów in Poland, the population is growing.

Rzeszów is the 14th largest Polish city in terms of population and the 20th largest city in terms of area.

== Geography ==
=== Climate ===
Rzeszów lies in the north temperate zone and has a continental climate with four distinct seasons. It is characterised by a significant variation between hot summers and cold, snowy winters. Average temperatures in summer range from 18 to 19.6 °C (64 to 67 °F) and in winter from −2.1 to 0 °C (28 to 32 °F). The average annual temperature is 8.9 °C (48 °F).

In summer temperatures often exceed 25 °C (77 °F), and sometimes even 30 °C (86 °F). In winter the temperature drops to −5 °C (23 °F) at night and about 0 °C (32 °F) at day. During very cold nights the temperature drops to −15 °C (5 °F). With Rzeszów being near the Carpathian Mountains, there is sometimes a halny – a föhn wind, when the temperature can rise rapidly.

Climate data for Rzeszów (Jasionka) 1991–2020 normals, extremes 1952–present
Month	Jan	Feb	Mar	Apr	May	Jun	Jul	Aug	Sep	Oct	Nov	Dec	Year
Record high °C (°F)	14.6 (58.3)	17.2 (63.0)	23.8 (74.8)	29.1 (84.4)	33.0 (91.4)	34.8 (94.6)	35.6 (96.1)	38.7 (101.7)	36.0 (96.8)	25.6 (78.1)	21.3 (70.3)	16.5 (61.7)	38.7 (101.7)
Mean maximum °C (°F)	8.0 (46.4)	10.9 (51.6)	17.1 (62.8)	23.9 (75.0)	27.5 (81.5)	30.5 (86.9)	32.1 (89.8)	32.0 (89.6)	27.2 (81.0)	22.3 (72.1)	16.2 (61.2)	9.3 (48.7)	33.1 (91.6)
Mean daily maximum °C (°F)	0.8 (33.4)	2.7 (36.9)	7.9 (46.2)	15.0 (59.0)	20.1 (68.2)	23.5 (74.3)	25.6 (78.1)	25.2 (77.4)	19.6 (67.3)	13.6 (56.5)	7.4 (45.3)	2.1 (35.8)	13.6 (56.5)
Daily mean °C (°F)	−1.9 (28.6)	−0.6 (30.9)	3.3 (37.9)	9.1 (48.4)	14.0 (57.2)	17.6 (63.7)	19.4 (66.9)	18.9 (66.0)	13.9 (57.0)	8.9 (48.0)	4.1 (39.4)	−0.5 (31.1)	8.9 (48.0)
Mean daily minimum °C (°F)	−4.7 (23.5)	−3.9 (25.0)	−0.8 (30.6)	3.4 (38.1)	8.2 (46.8)	11.9 (53.4)	13.5 (56.3)	13.0 (55.4)	8.9 (48.0)	4.8 (40.6)	1.2 (34.2)	−3.0 (26.6)	4.4 (39.9)
Mean minimum °C (°F)	−17.5 (0.5)	−15.4 (4.3)	−9.3 (15.3)	−3.8 (25.2)	0.8 (33.4)	5.9 (42.6)	7.9 (46.2)	6.7 (44.1)	1.3 (34.3)	−3.6 (25.5)	−7.7 (18.1)	−13.8 (7.2)	−20.3 (−4.5)
Record low °C (°F)	−33.6 (−28.5)	−35.8 (−32.4)	−30.9 (−23.6)	−10.0 (14.0)	−4.6 (23.7)	−0.9 (30.4)	3.7 (38.7)	0.9 (33.6)	−5.3 (22.5)	−11.4 (11.5)	−21.0 (−5.8)	−29.8 (−21.6)	−35.8 (−32.4)
Average precipitation mm (inches)	33.4 (1.31)	32.3 (1.27)	39.0 (1.54)	45.9 (1.81)	79.3 (3.12)	81.6 (3.21)	90.8 (3.57)	63.5 (2.50)	66.0 (2.60)	49.6 (1.95)	36.1 (1.42)	34.4 (1.35)	651.8 (25.66)
Average extreme snow depth cm (inches)	8.2 (3.2)	8.8 (3.5)	5.4 (2.1)	1.5 (0.6)	0.0 (0.0)	0.0 (0.0)	0.0 (0.0)	0.0 (0.0)	0.0 (0.0)	0.5 (0.2)	3.1 (1.2)	4.4 (1.7)	8.8 (3.5)
Average precipitation days (≥ 0.1 mm)	16.23	14.61	13.90	12.43	14.07	13.20	14.23	11.23	11.10	12.07	13.47	15.40	161.94
Average snowy days (≥ 0 cm)	18.0	16.2	6.8	0.8	0.0	0.0	0.0	0.0	0.0	0.4	4.6	12.0	58.8
Average relative humidity (%)	85.2	82.4	76.5	70.8	73.6	74.4	74.4	75.0	80.4	83.0	86.3	86.5	79.0
Mean monthly sunshine hours	48.9	67.1	124.1	177.8	231.0	232.4	245.9	240.7	163.5	117.3	55.4	38.6	1,742.8
Source 1: Institute of Meteorology and Water Management
Source 2: Meteomodel.pl (records, relative humidity 1991–2020)

See or edit raw graph data.

=== Main sights ===
- The Main Square
- Rzeszów Town Hall, built in 1591, later remodelled in Neogothic and Renaissance Revival styles
- Saint Adalbert and Saint Stanislaus Church, built in 15th century in Gothic style
- Basilica of the Assumption of the Blessed Virgin Mary (Bernardine monastery), built in 17th century in Baroque style
- Regional Museum, located in the former 17th century Piarists monastery
- Old Town (17th century) and New Town (18th century, restored 1954–63) Synagogues
- Rzeszów Castle, rebuilt in 17th century
- Lubomirski Summer Palace, rebuilt in 18th century in Rococo style
- Wanda Siemaszkowa Theatre - former Sokol houses, built 1890-1900
- PKO Bank Building, built 1906–07 in Renaissance Revival style
- Socialist realist buildings of the Rzeszów Court of Appeals (former regional headquarters of the Polish United Workers' Party) and of the Music Institute
- Modernist building of the Subcarpathian Philharmonic
- Monument to The Revolutionary Action, erected in 1974
- Olszynki Park - 220.67 meters (724.0 ft) high skyscraper
- Podziemia, Tunnels
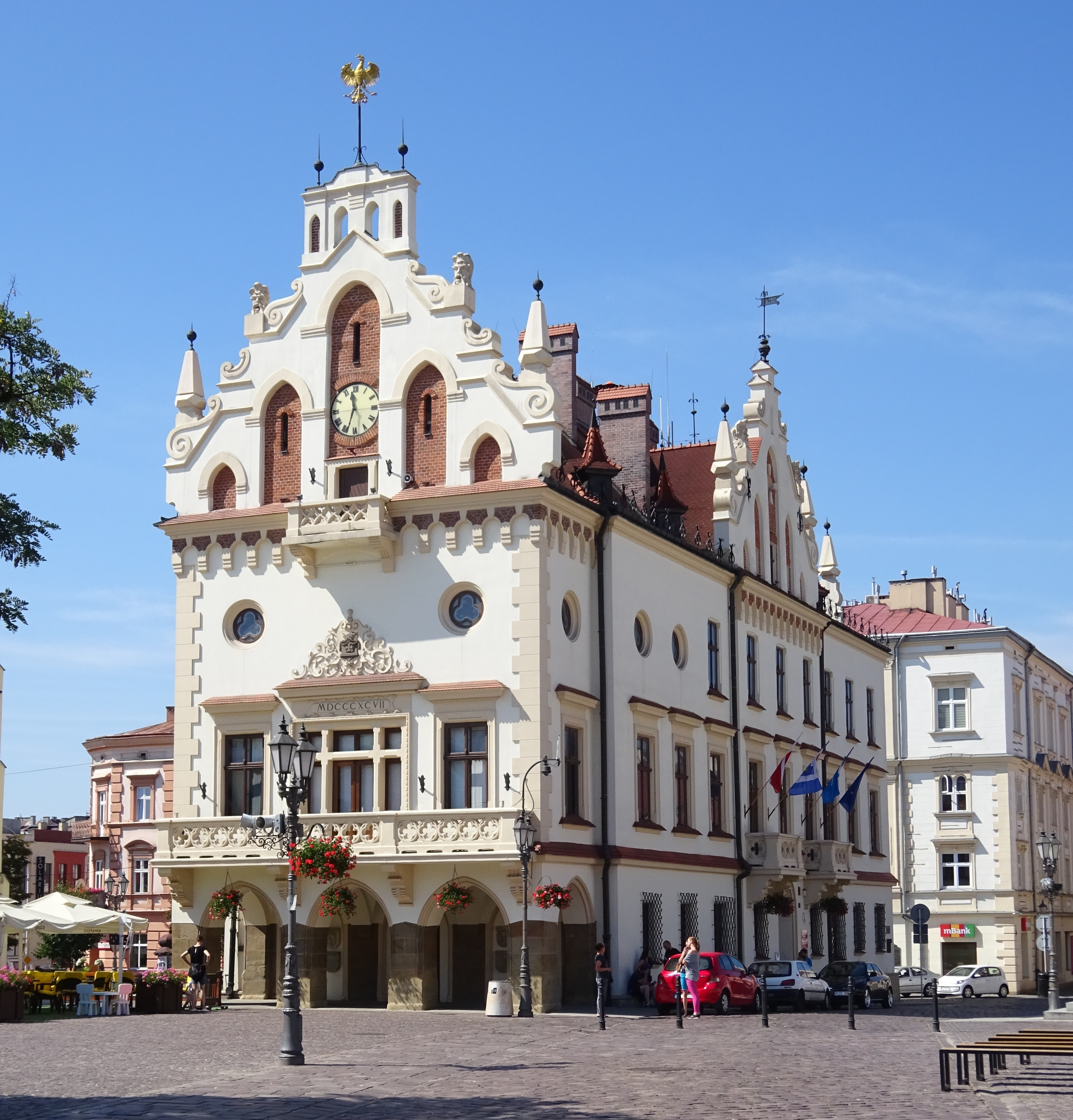
City Hall

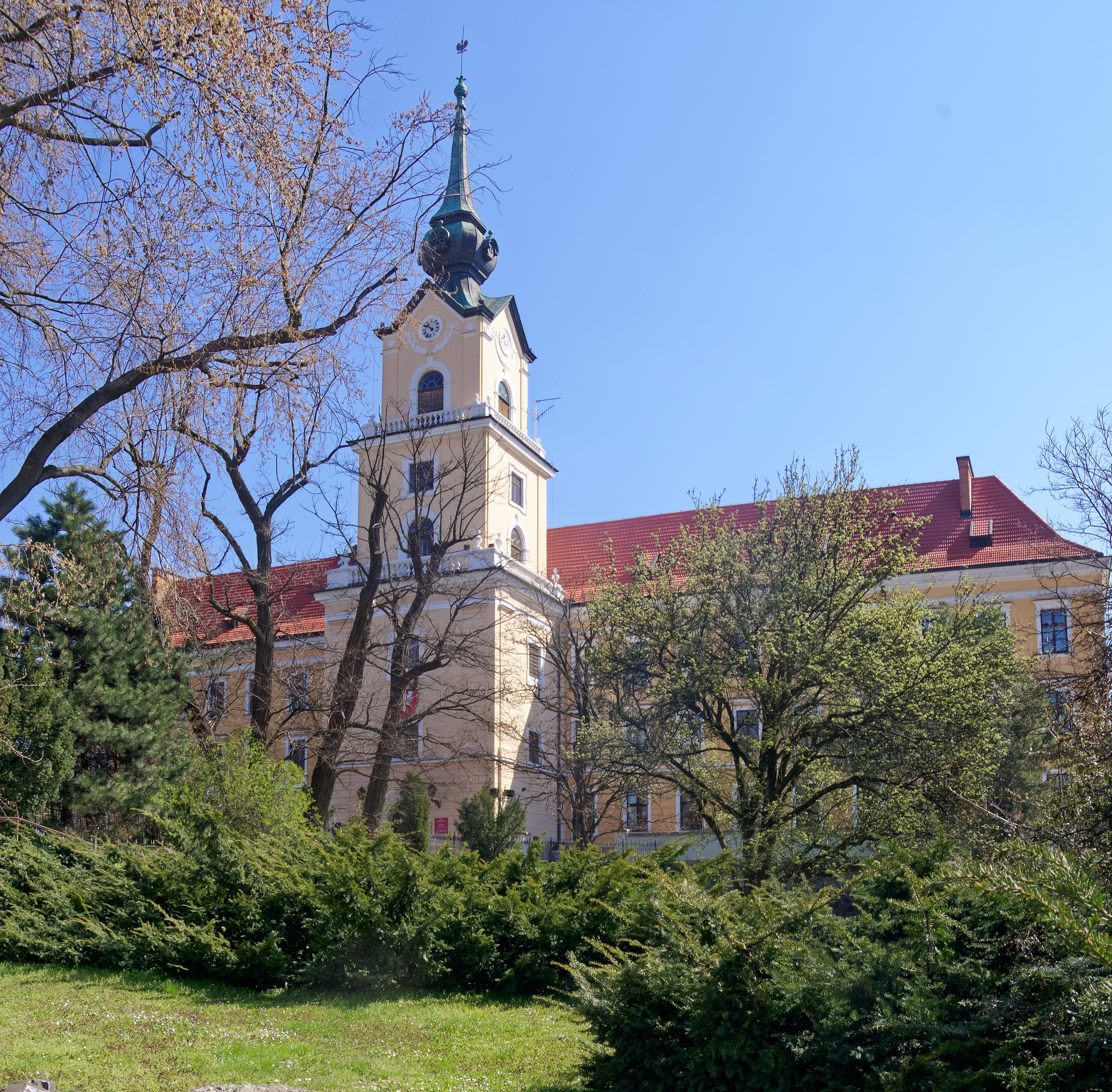
Rzeszów Castle

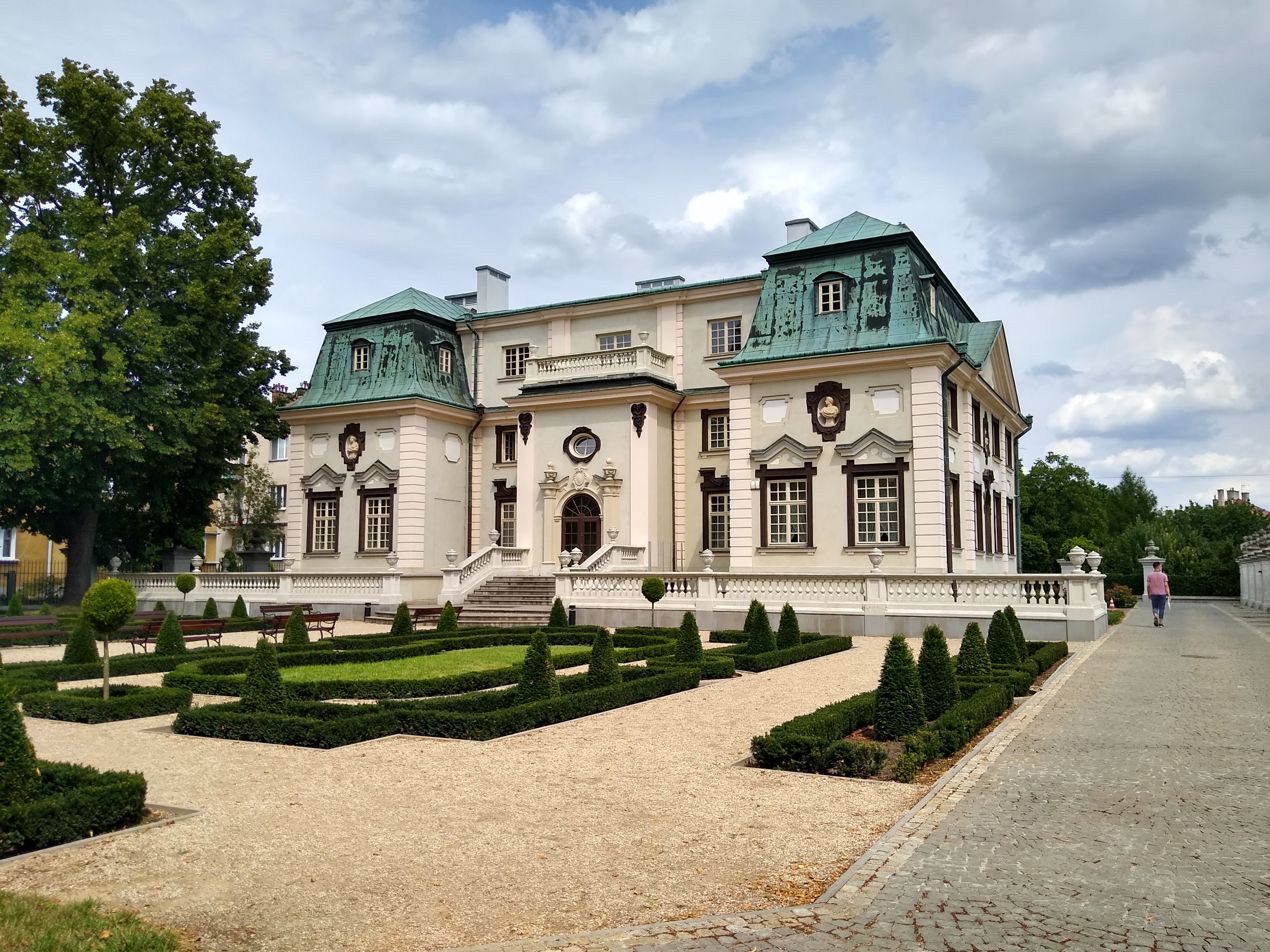
Lubomirski Summer Palace

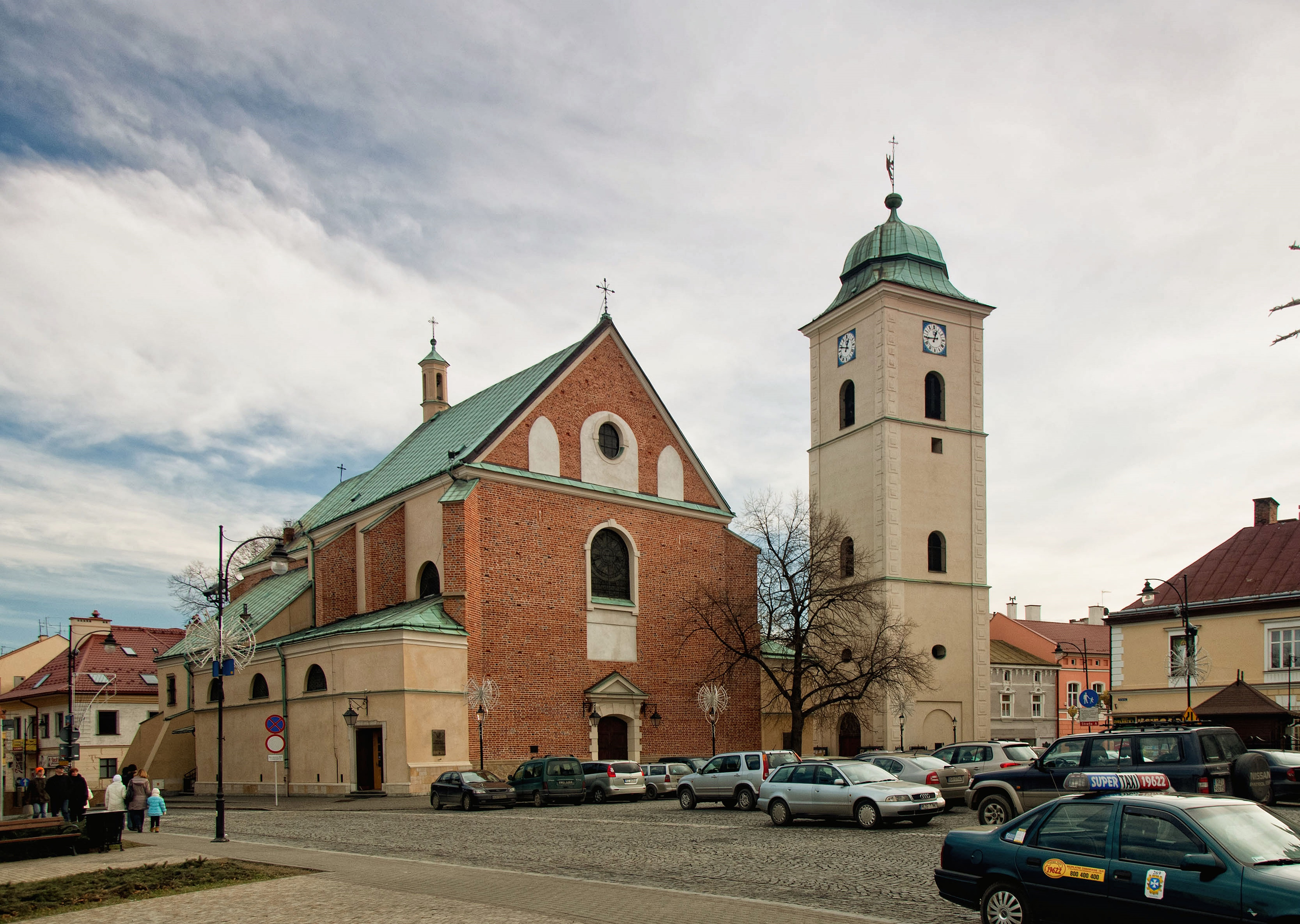
Saint Adalbert and Saint Stanislaus Church

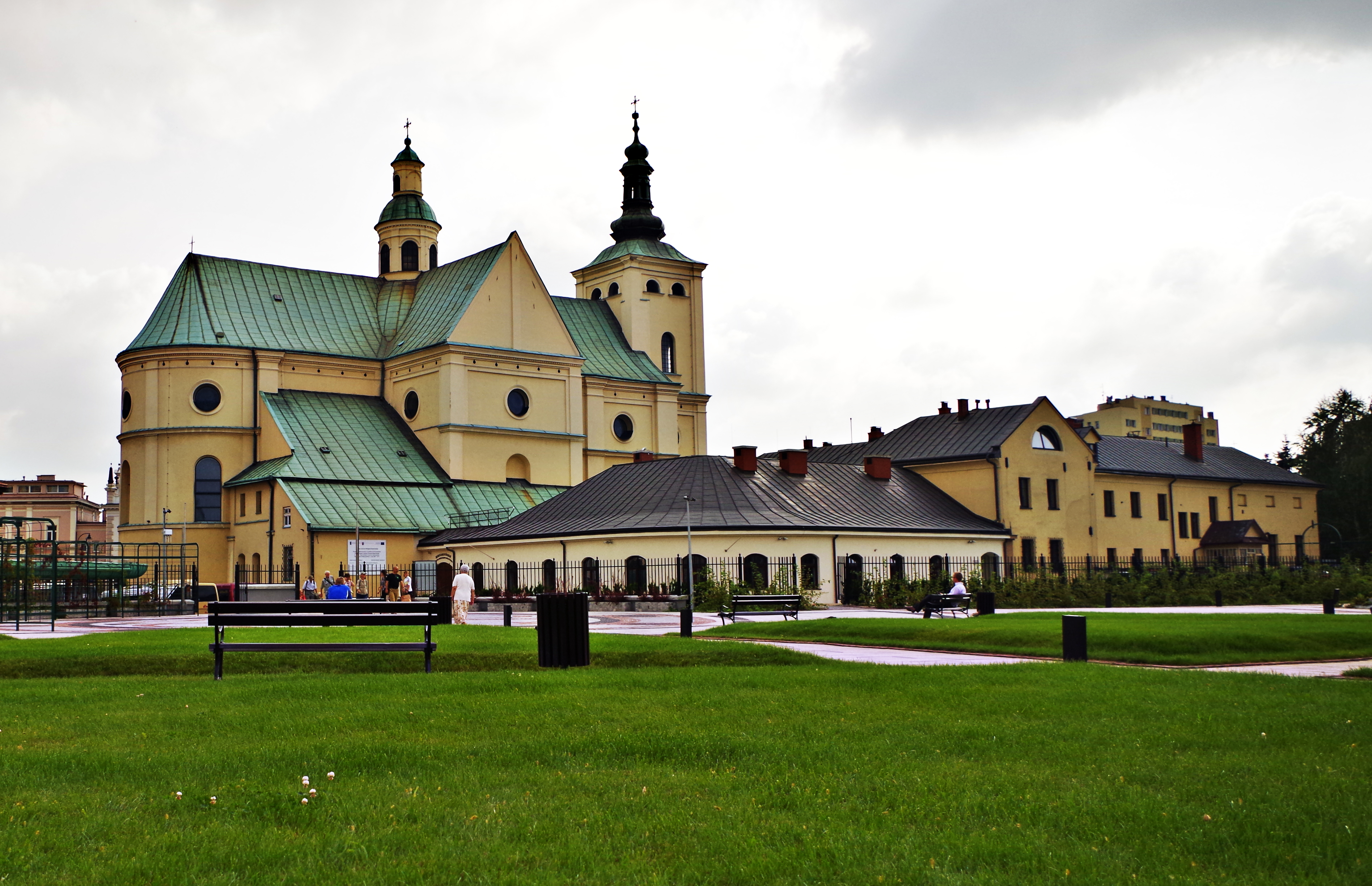
Basilica of the Assumption

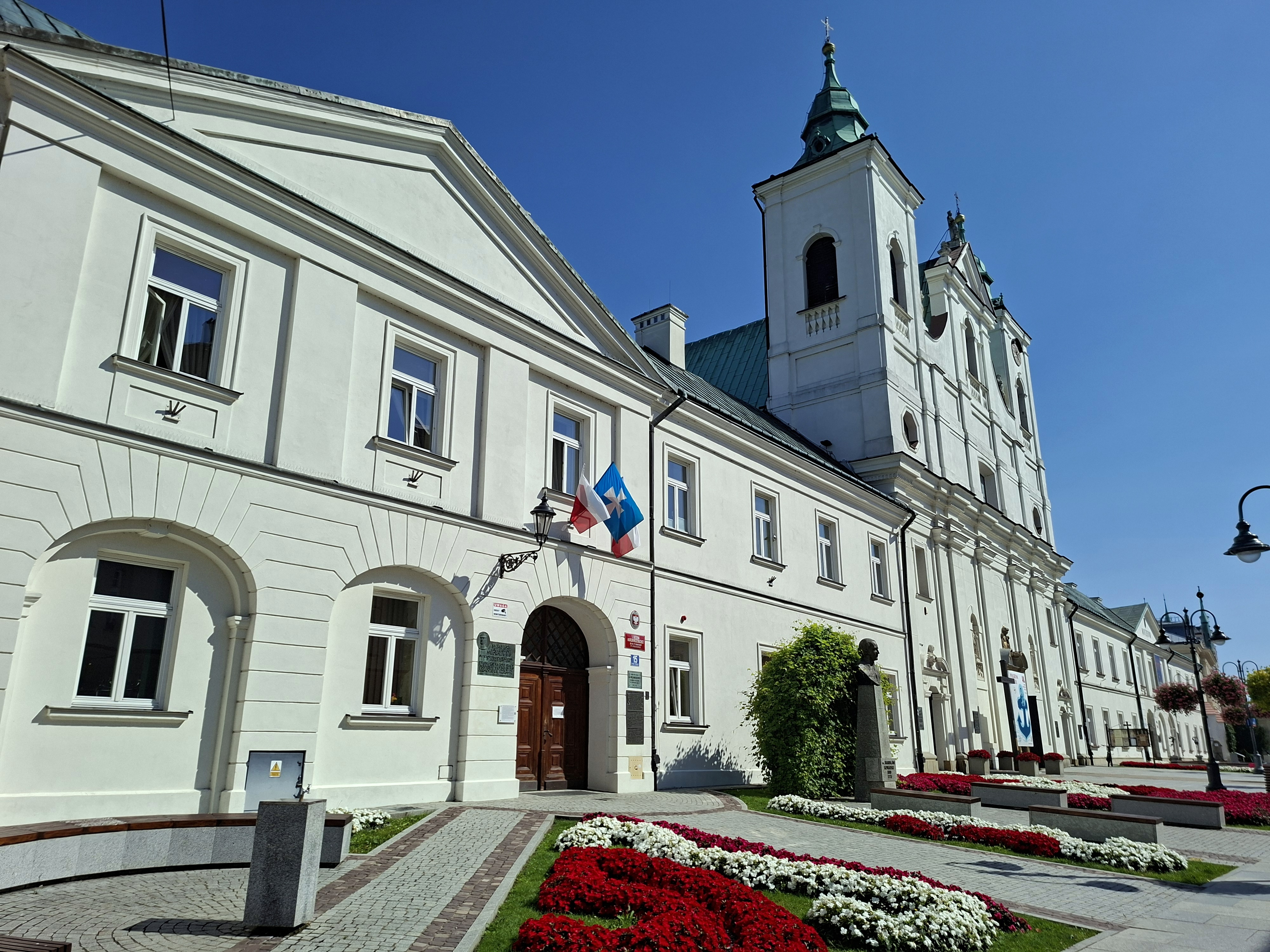
Regional Museum in Rzeszów

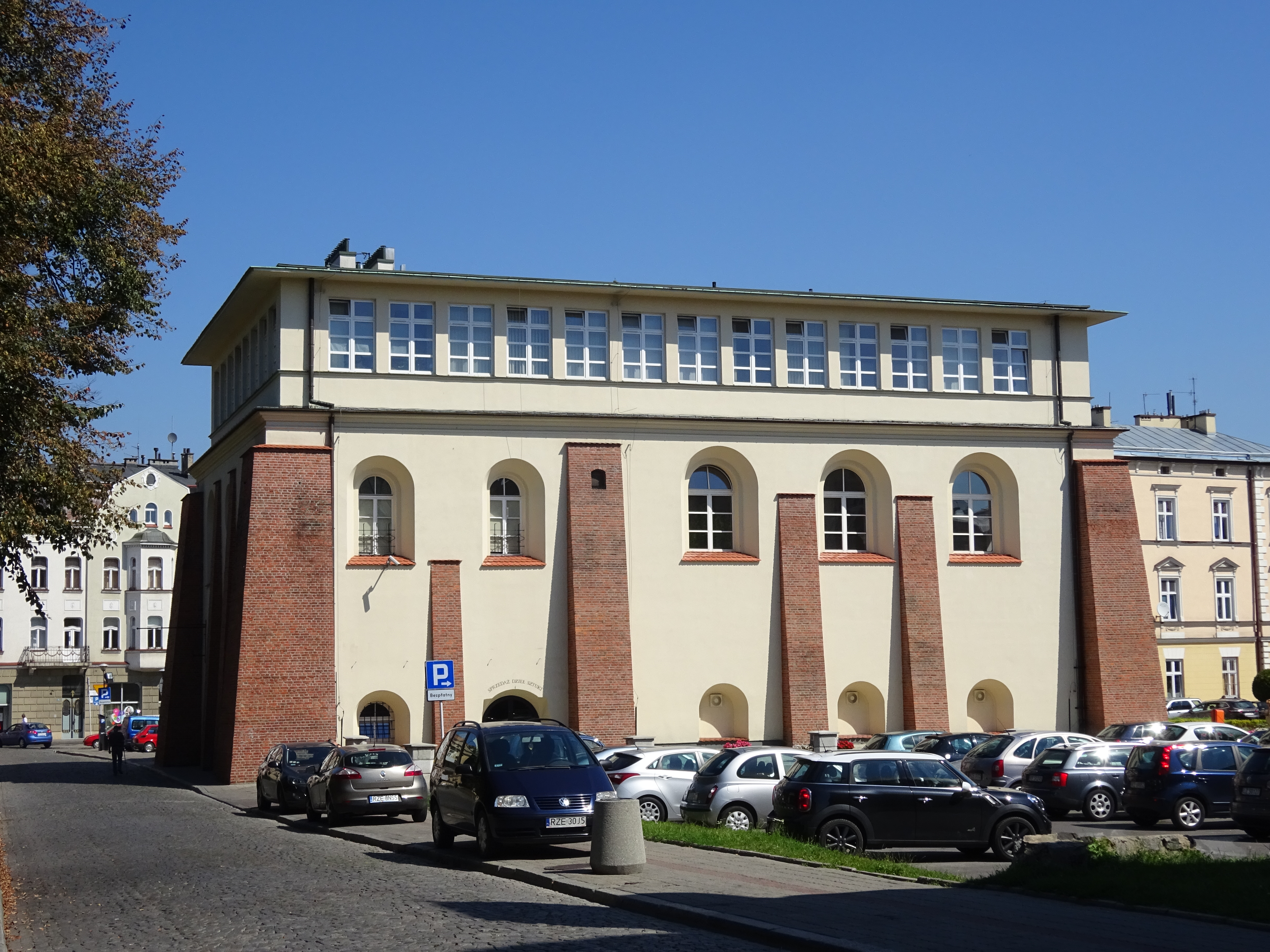
New Town Synagogue

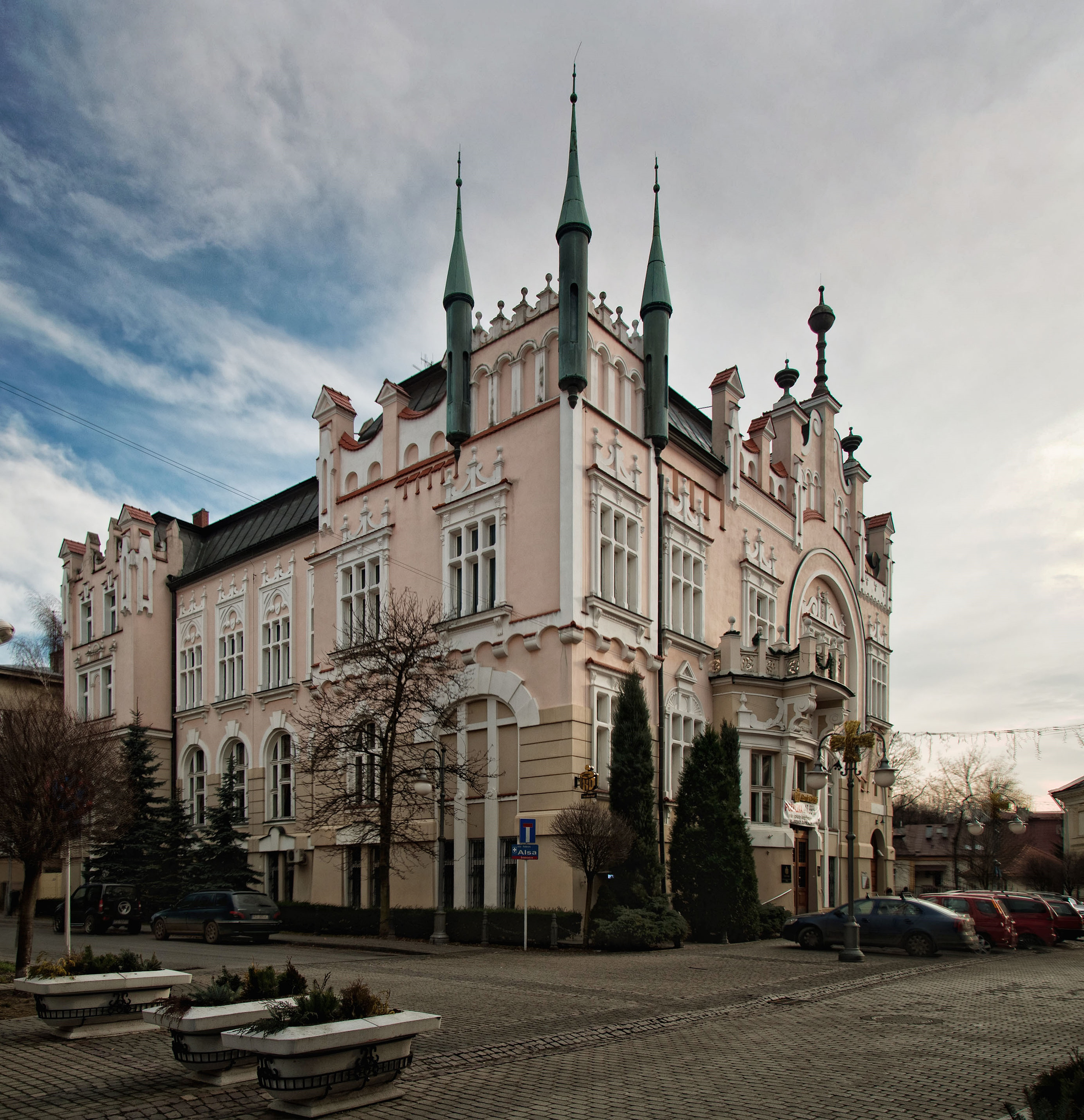
PKO Bank Building

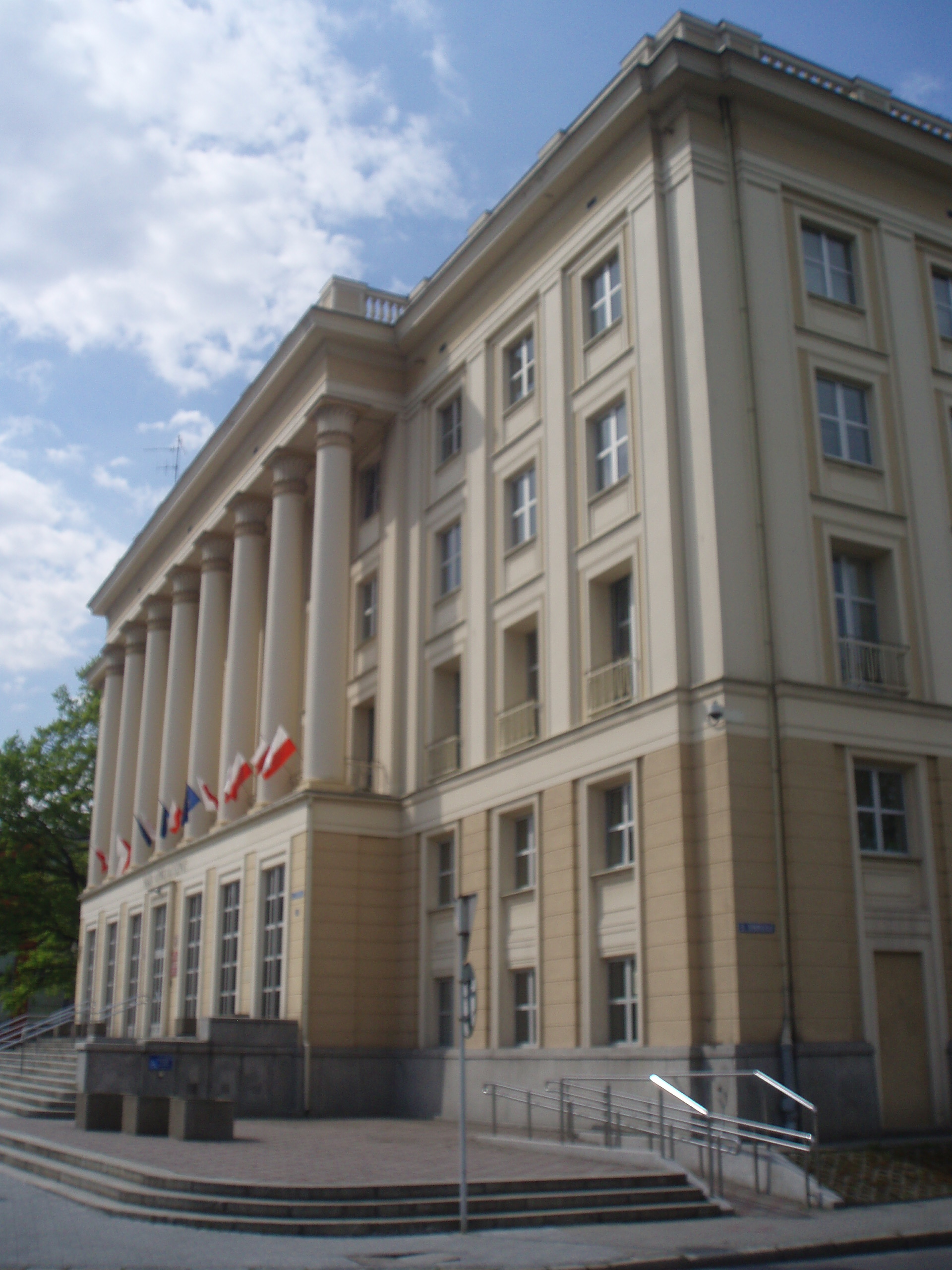
Rzeszów Court of Appeals

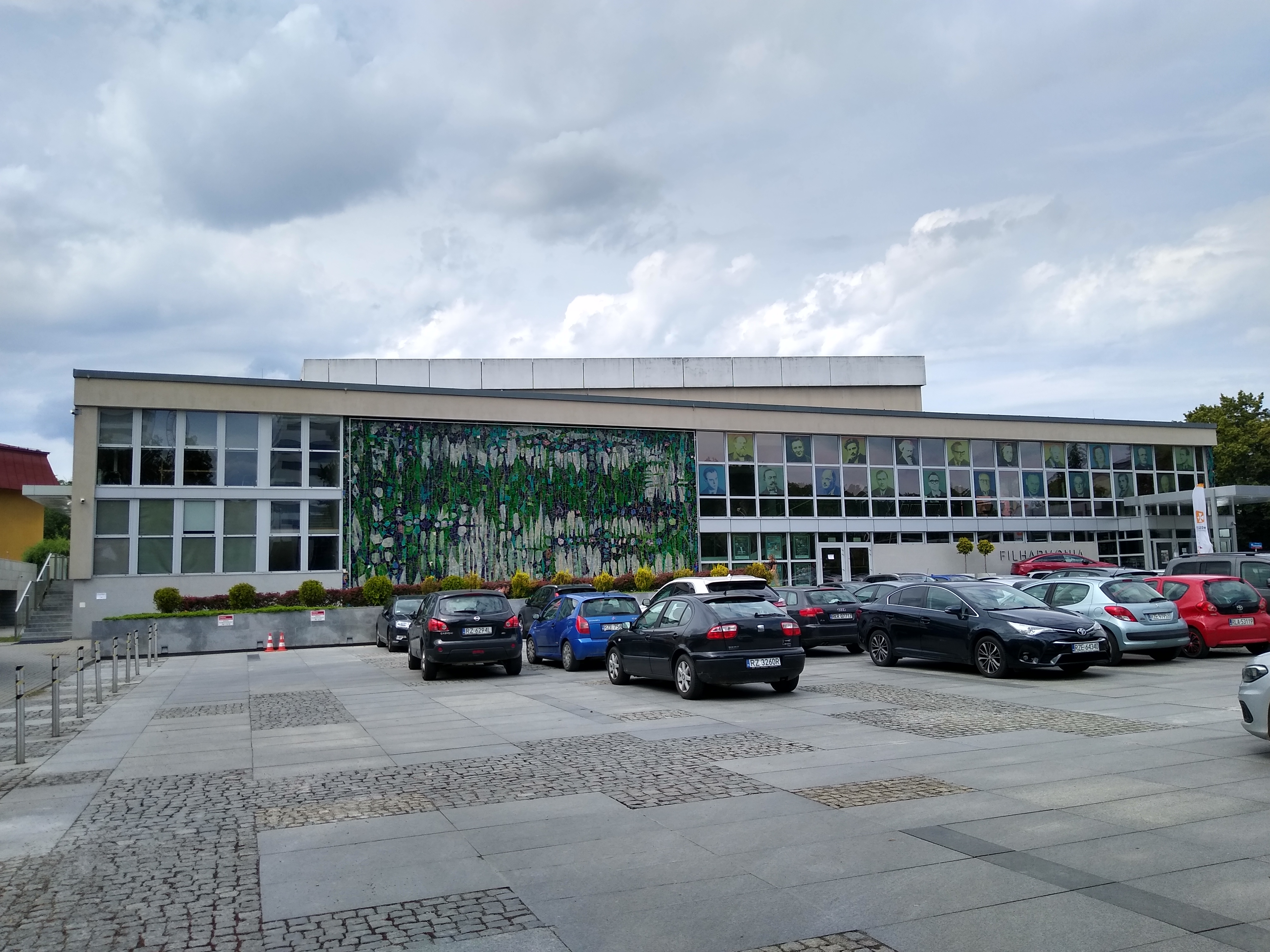
Subcarpathian Philharmonic

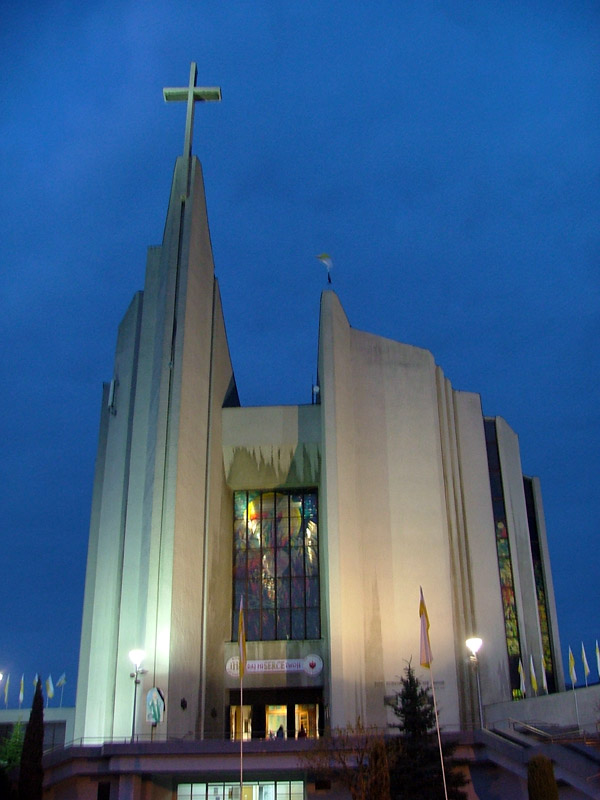
Rzeszów Cathedral

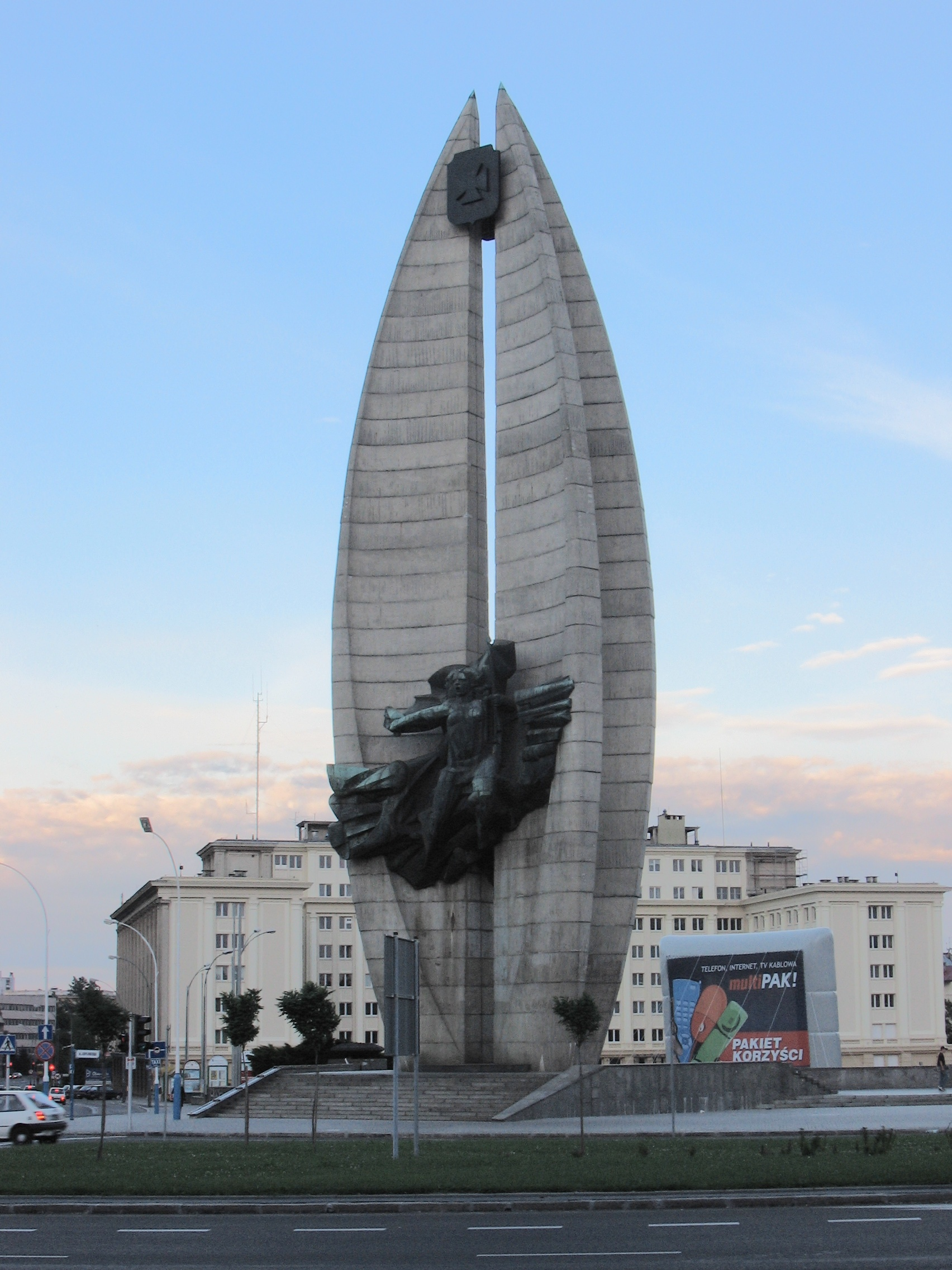
Revolution Monument

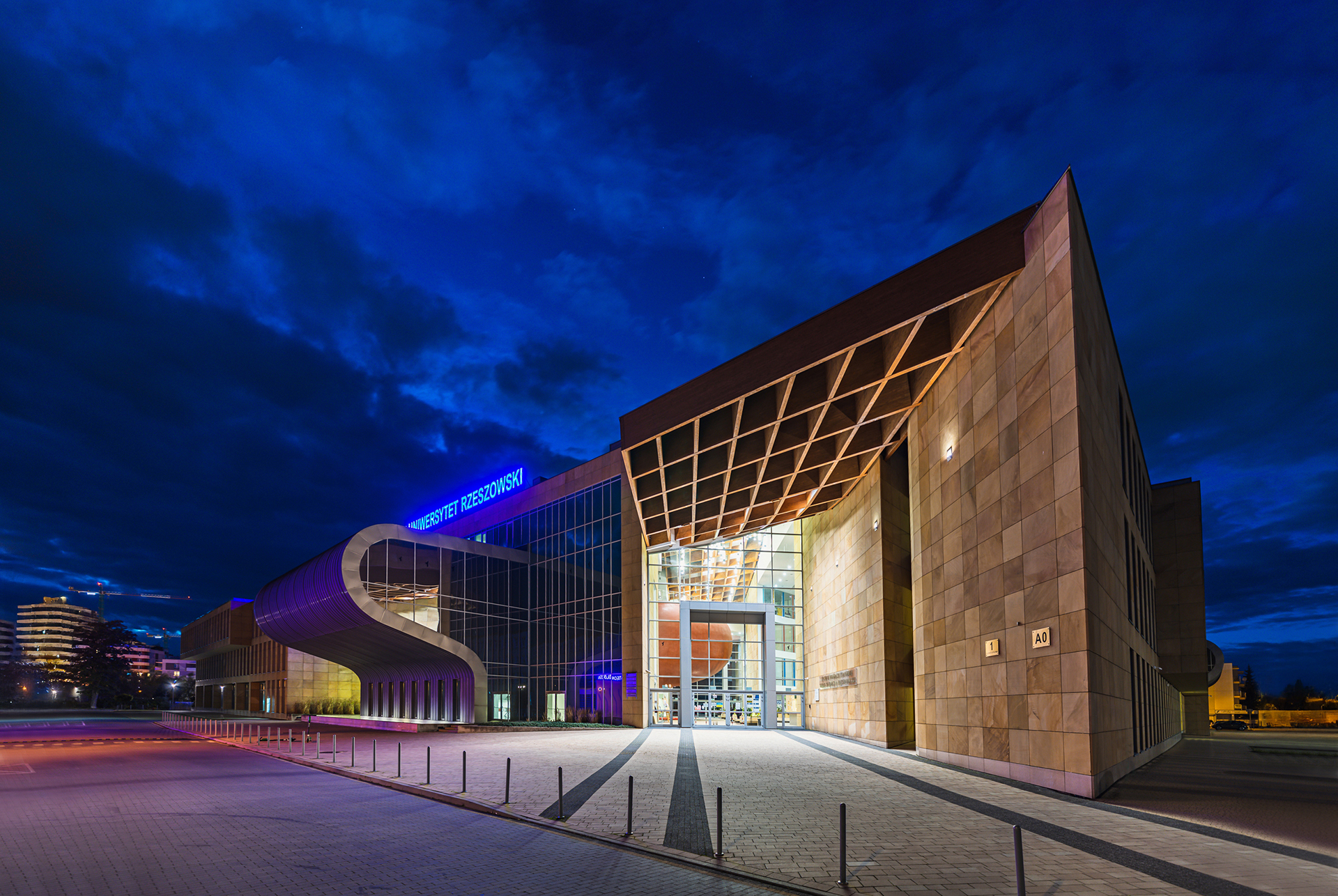
Auditorium Building at the University of Rzeszów

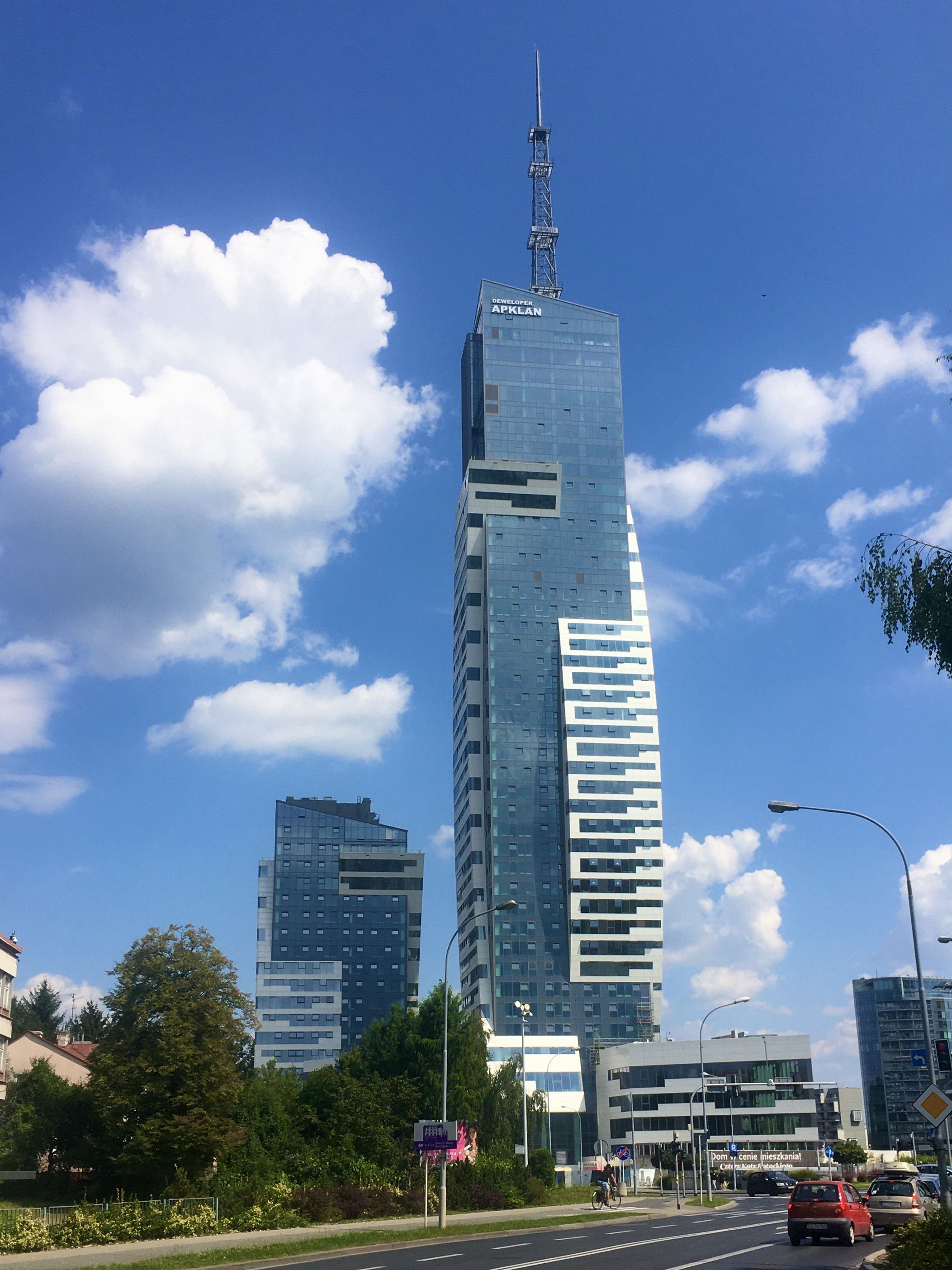
Olszynki Park skyscraper

== Culture ==
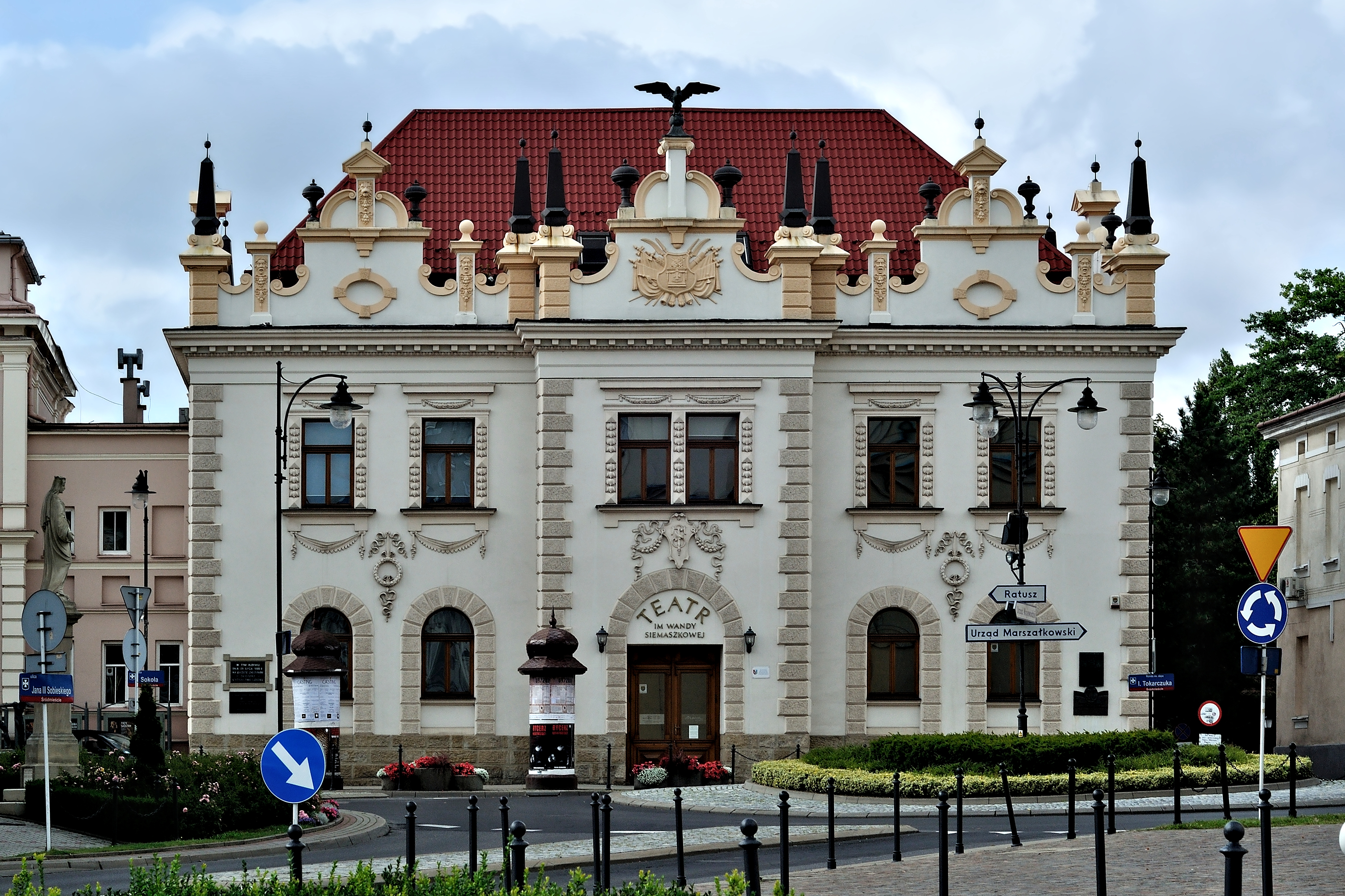
Wanda Siemaszkowa Theatre

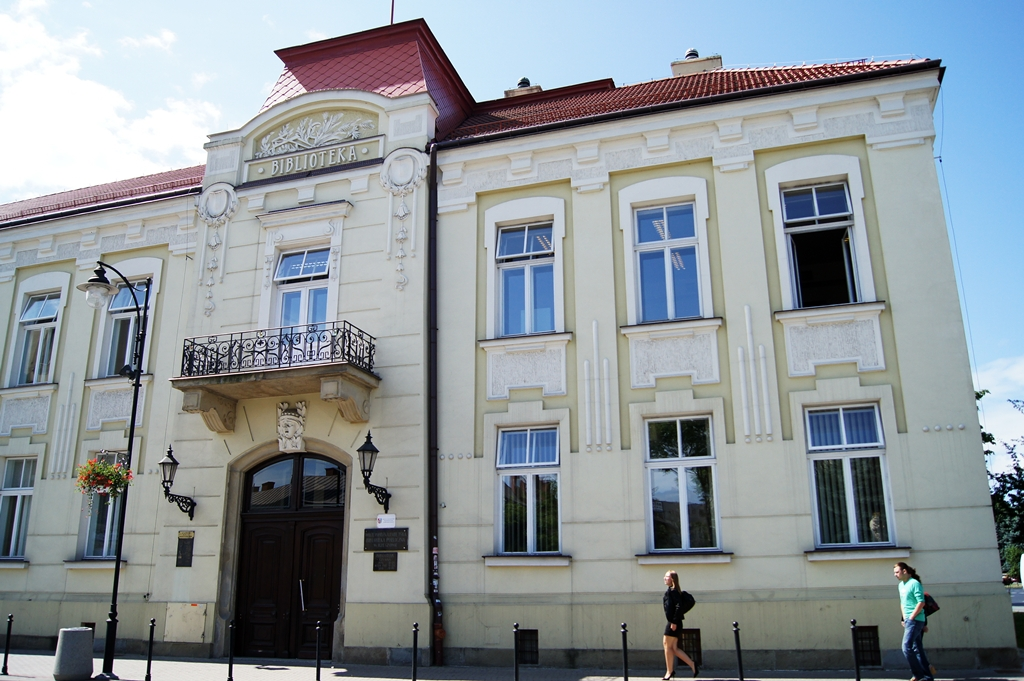
Provincial and City Public Library

=== Theatres ===
- Wanda Siemaszkowa Theatre (est. 1944)
- Maska Theatre
- Rzeszów Dance Theatre

=== Museums ===
- Ethnographic Museum
- Museum of the City of Rzeszów
- Diocesan Museum
- Rzeszów Castle

=== Art galleries ===
- "Szajna" gallery
- "Pod Ratuszem" gallery
- "z Podwórza" gallery
- OPe Photo Gallery

=== Libraries ===
- Provincial and City Public Library in Rzeszów
- Rzeszów University Library
- Rzeszów University of Technology Library

=== Other ===
- Podpromie Hall
- Artur Malawski Philharmonic Hall

== Sports ==
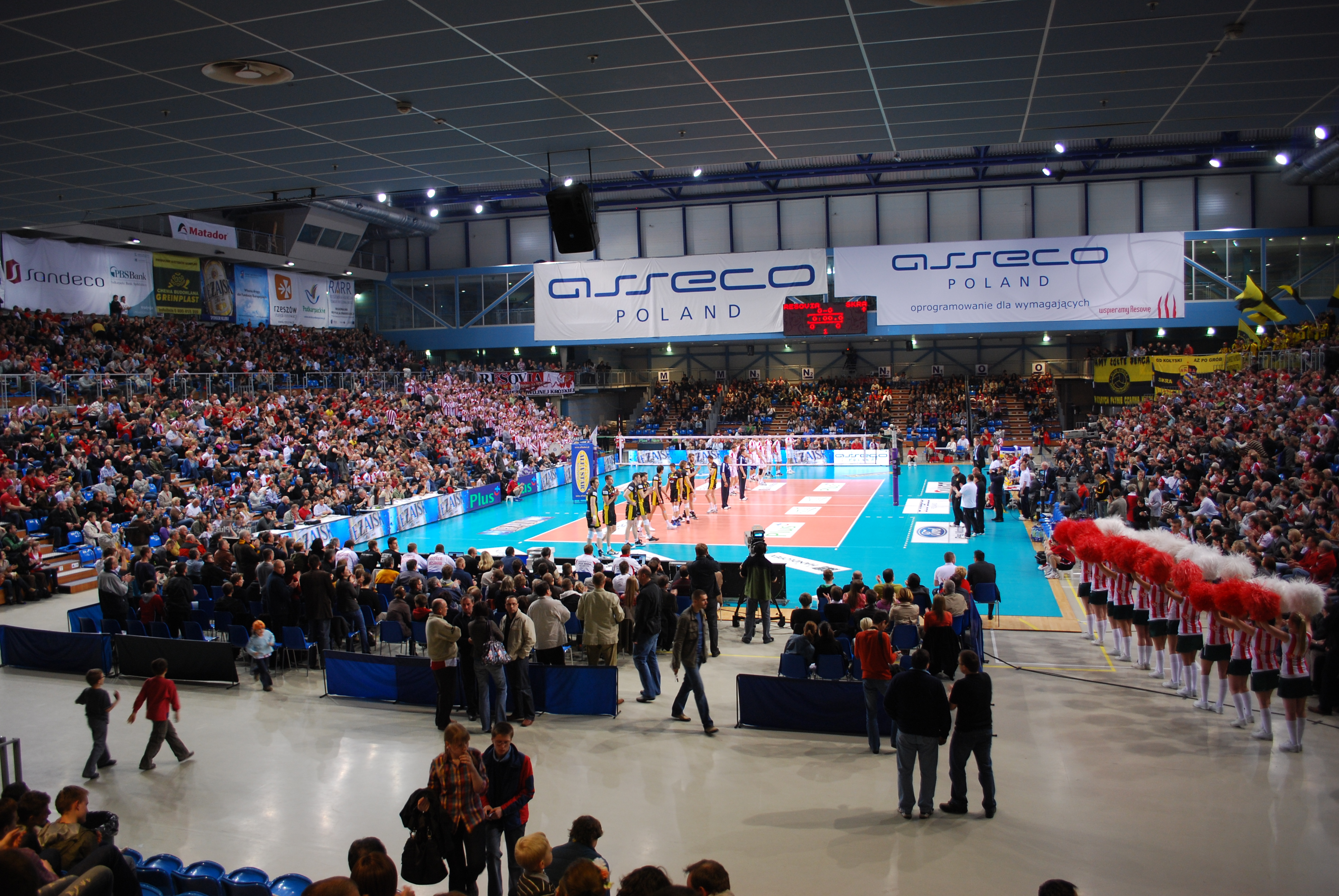
Volleyball match between Resovia and Skra Bełchatów

Professional sports teams
Club	Sport	League	Trophies
Resovia	Volleyball (men's)	PlusLiga	7 Polish Championships; 3 Polish Cups (1975, 1983, 1987); 1 CEV Cup (2024)
KS Developres Rzeszów	Volleyball (women's)	Tauron Liga	1 Polish Championship (2025); 2 Polish Cups (2022, 2025)
Stal Rzeszów	Speedway	I liga	2 Polish Championships (1960, 1961)
Resovia	Football (men's)	II liga	0
Stal Rzeszów	Football (men's)	I liga	1 Polish Cup (1975)
Resovia	Basketball (men's)	I Liga	1 Polish Championship (1975); 1 Polish Cup (1974)

== Economy and infrastructure ==
=== Industry ===
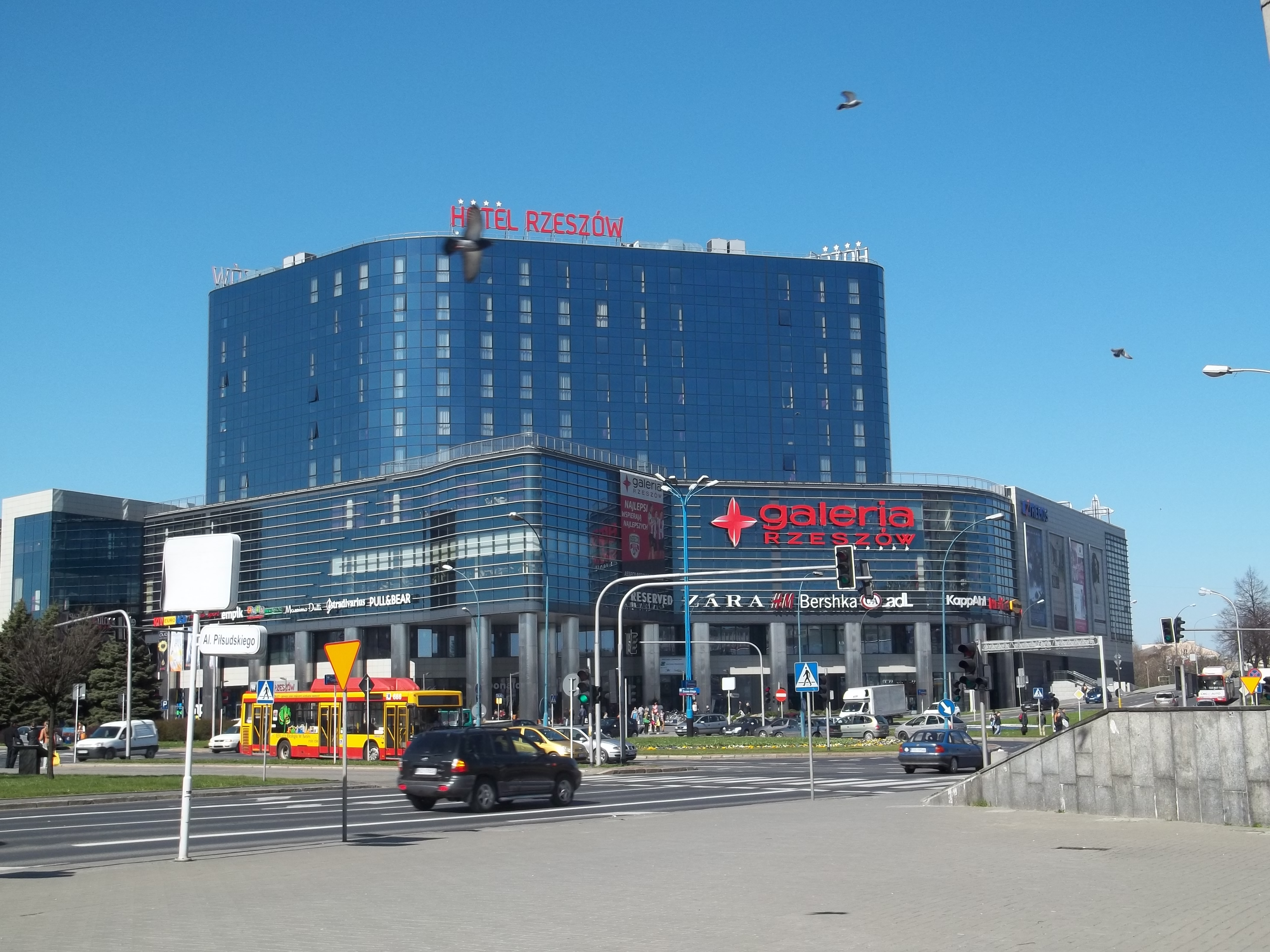
CH Galeria Rzeszów – the largest shopping center in the city

- Asseco Poland SA (earlier Comp Rzeszów S.A.) – one of Poland’s largest software groups—has its headquarters in Rzeszów (Olchowa 14).
- The Eastern Poland IT Cluster (Klaster IT) groups regional ICT firms and is headquartered in Rzeszów
- FIBRAIN – manufacturer in the field of ICT systems
- G2A.COM Limited - a global digital marketplace which specializes in gaming products
- Goodrich Corporation opened a 5.3-hectare (13-acre) manufacturing facility near Rzeszów in November 2010
- Novartis International AG (NYSE:NVS) Rzeszów – Gerber Products Company food production facilities
- Sanofi-Aventis (NYSE:SNY)
- United Technologies Corporation (NYSE:UTX) Pratt & Whitney division (acquired WSK-PZL Rzeszów) – Aerospace engineering including one of the world's two F-16 engine manufacturers
- Valeant Pharmaceuticals International (NYSE:VRX) Rzeszów (formerly ICN Polfa Rzeszów)
- Zelmer SA – household equipment

At Widełka substation, situated approximately 20 kilometres (12 miles) north-northeast of Rzeszów, the Rzeszów–Khmelnytskyi powerline, the only 750 kV powerline in Poland, ends.

=== Media ===
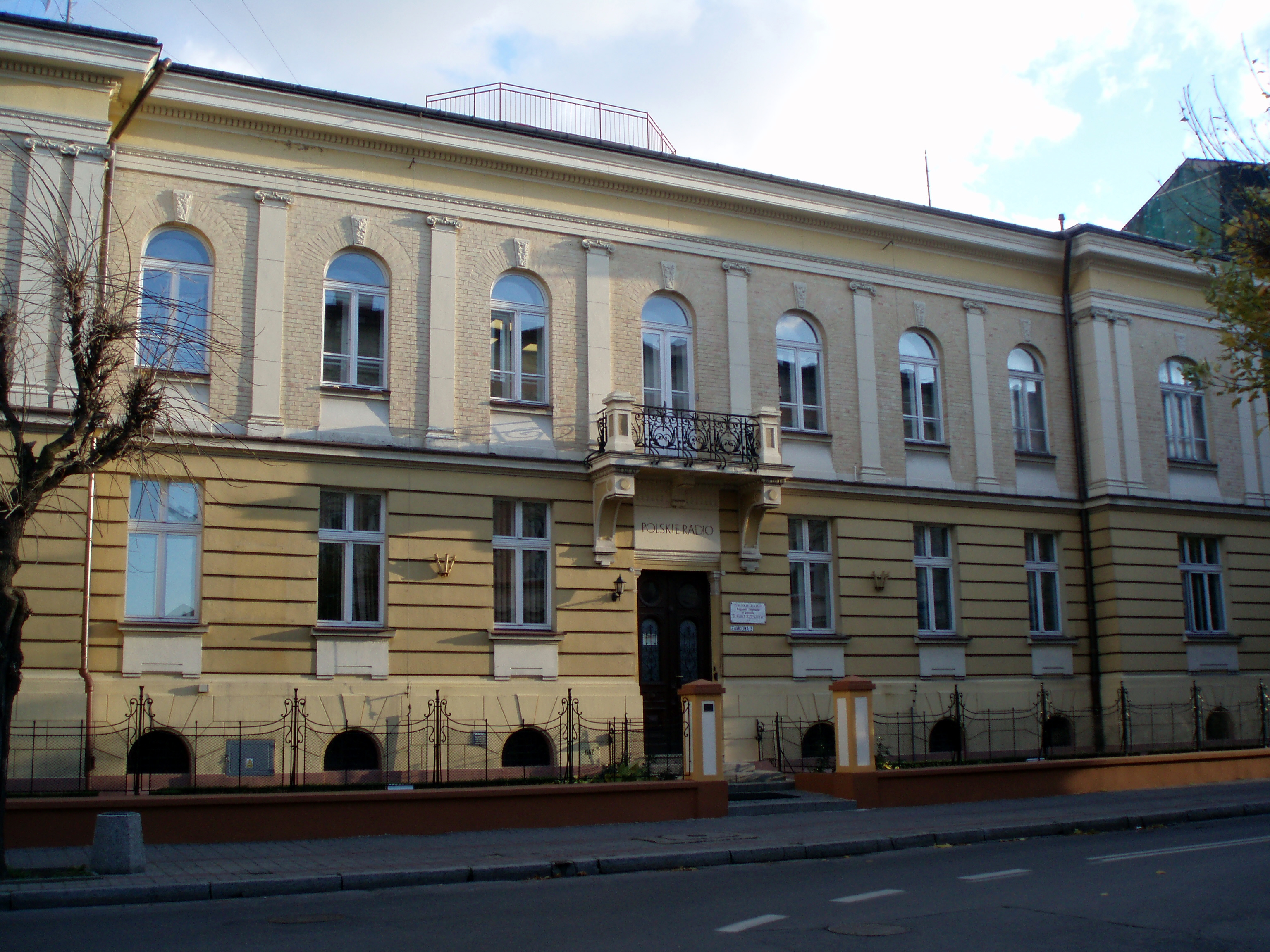
Burgaller Palace (Polish Radio Rzeszów)

==== Radio ====
- Radio Rzeszów
- Radio Eska Rzeszów
- Akademickie Radio Centrum
- Katolickie Radio Via
- Radio RES

==== Press ====
- Gazeta Codzienna NOWINY
- Super Nowości
- Nasz Dom
- Gazeta Wyborcza Rzeszów

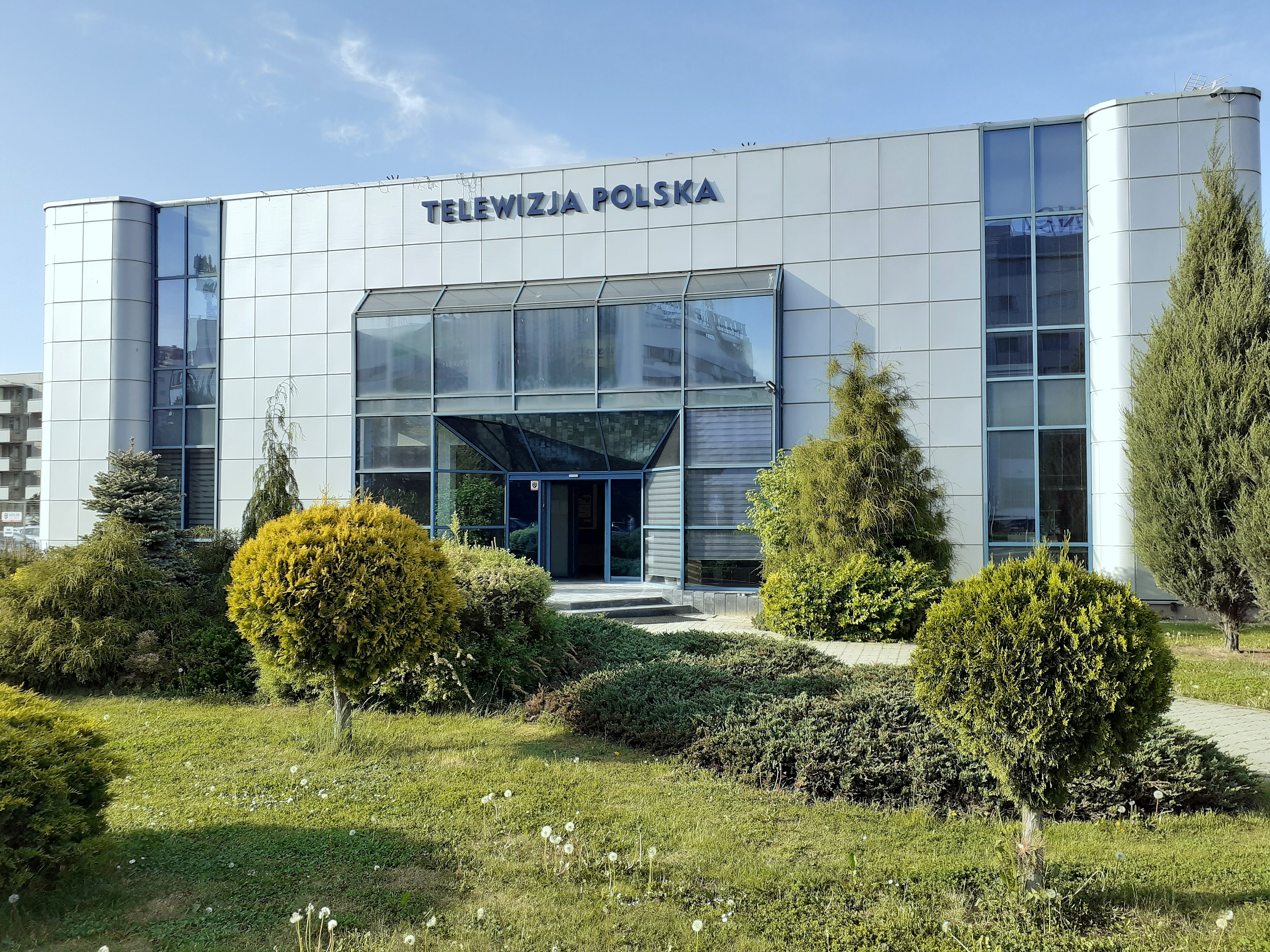
TVP Rzeszów

==== Television ====
- Polish Television (TVP) branch in Rzeszów
- Rzeszów municipal television

==== Internet ====
- Rzeszow-Info.pl

=== Transport ===
==== Transit ====
Rzeszów is located on the main West-East European E40 Highway, which goes from Calais in France via Belgium, across Germany, Poland, Ukraine and onto Russia and Kazakhstan. Within Poland the E40 follows the A4 Highway, passing through Wrocław, Katowice, Kraków and Korczowa. The S19 Expressway connects Rzeszów with Belarus and Slovakia as part of planned Via Carpathia route from the Baltic to the Black Sea.

In recent years, communication has been improved by a modernization of the roads within the city. SCATS traffic system has been implemented. The A4 highway and S19 expressway act as bypass of the city, running through the northern and eastern districts of Rzeszów.

==== Airport ====
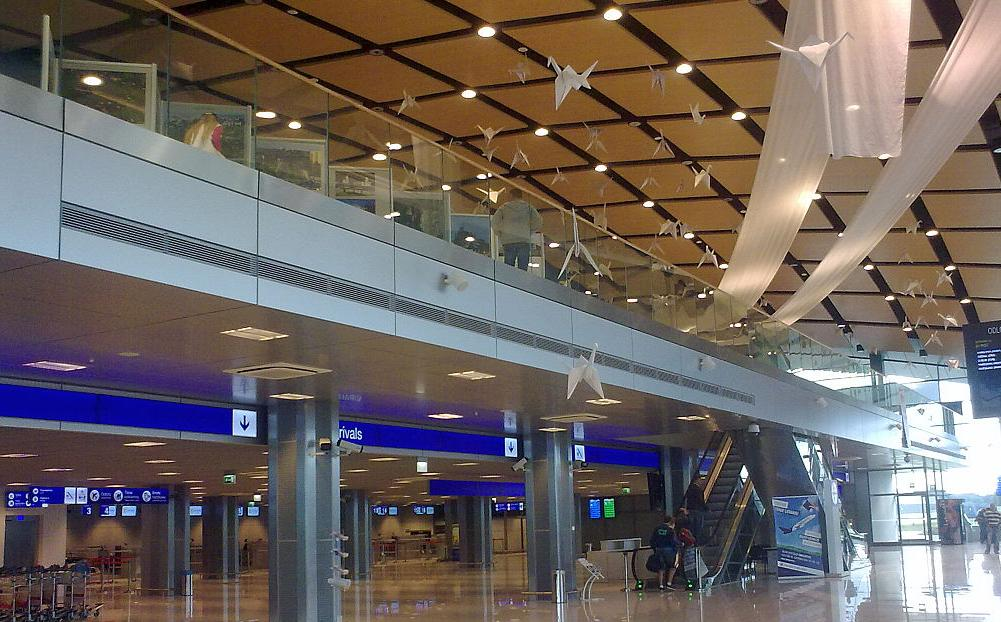
Rzeszów–Jasionka Airport

Rzeszów-Jasionka Airport (Port Lotniczy Rzeszów-Jasionka) is located in the village of Jasionka 10 kilometres (6.2 miles) north of the city. As of June 2015 scheduled passenger services are offered by Ryanair, LOT Polish Airlines, and Lufthansa. This is supplemented seasonally by tourist charter flights to typical summer leisure destinations.

==== Buses ====
The city operates 49 bus lines including night and airport buses. Rzeszów is also a gateway to the Bieszczady mountains, with many buses heading for Sanok.

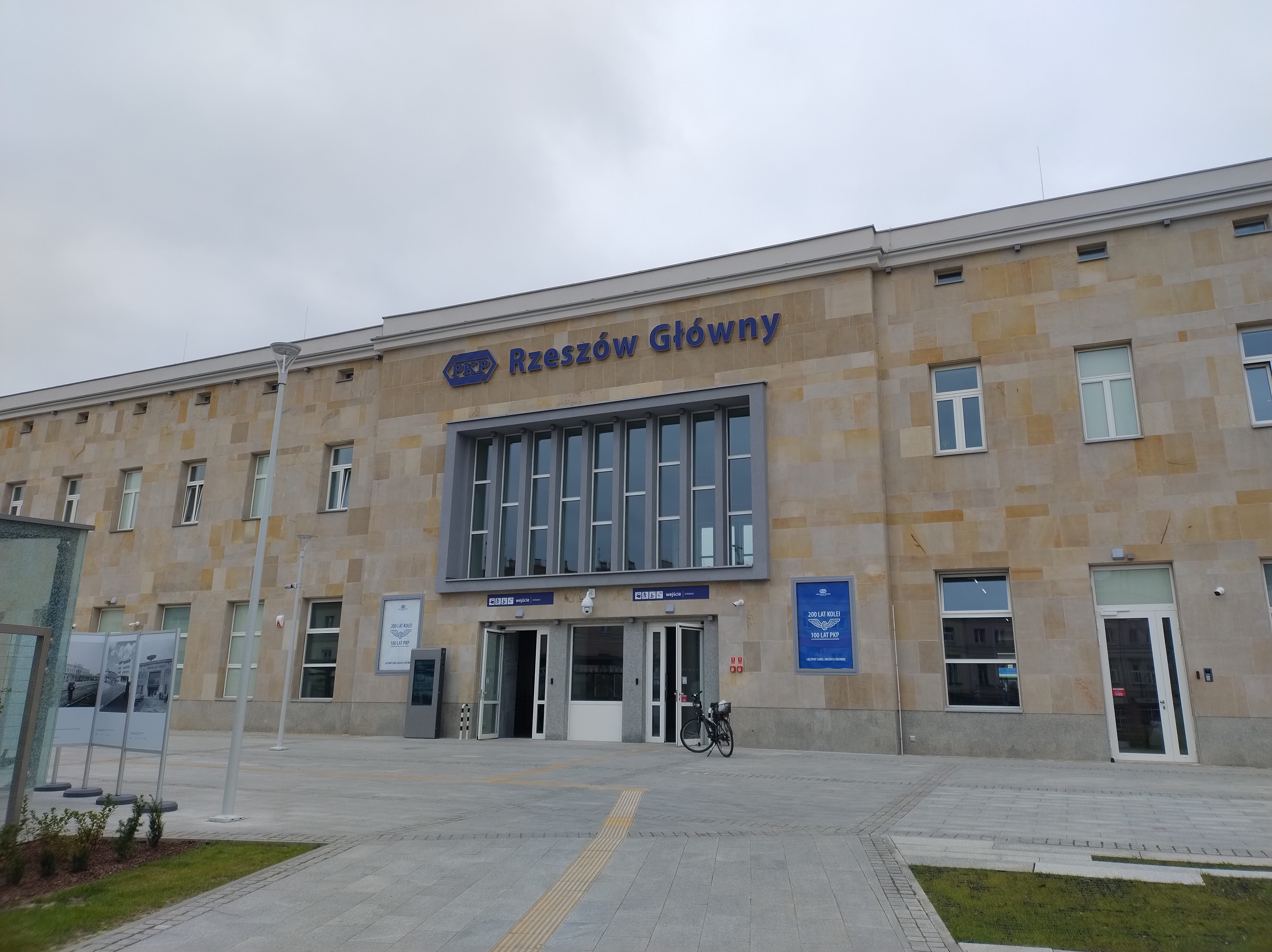
Rzeszów Główny railway station

==== Railways ====
Rzeszów is an important rail hub is on the main west–east rail route; Line 91. This runs from Silesia and Kraków, Kraków Main station (Kraków Główny) – Medyka on the Polish eastern border. This line then continues on to Ukraine. Its main railway station was established in the 19th century and apart from it, there are five additional stations in the city: Rzeszów Staroniwa, Rzeszów Zwięczyca, Rzeszów Osiedle, Rzeszów Załęże and Rzeszów Zachodni (freight only). There are also two non-electrified lines stemming from Rzeszów – to Jasło and to Tarnobrzeg.

== Education ==
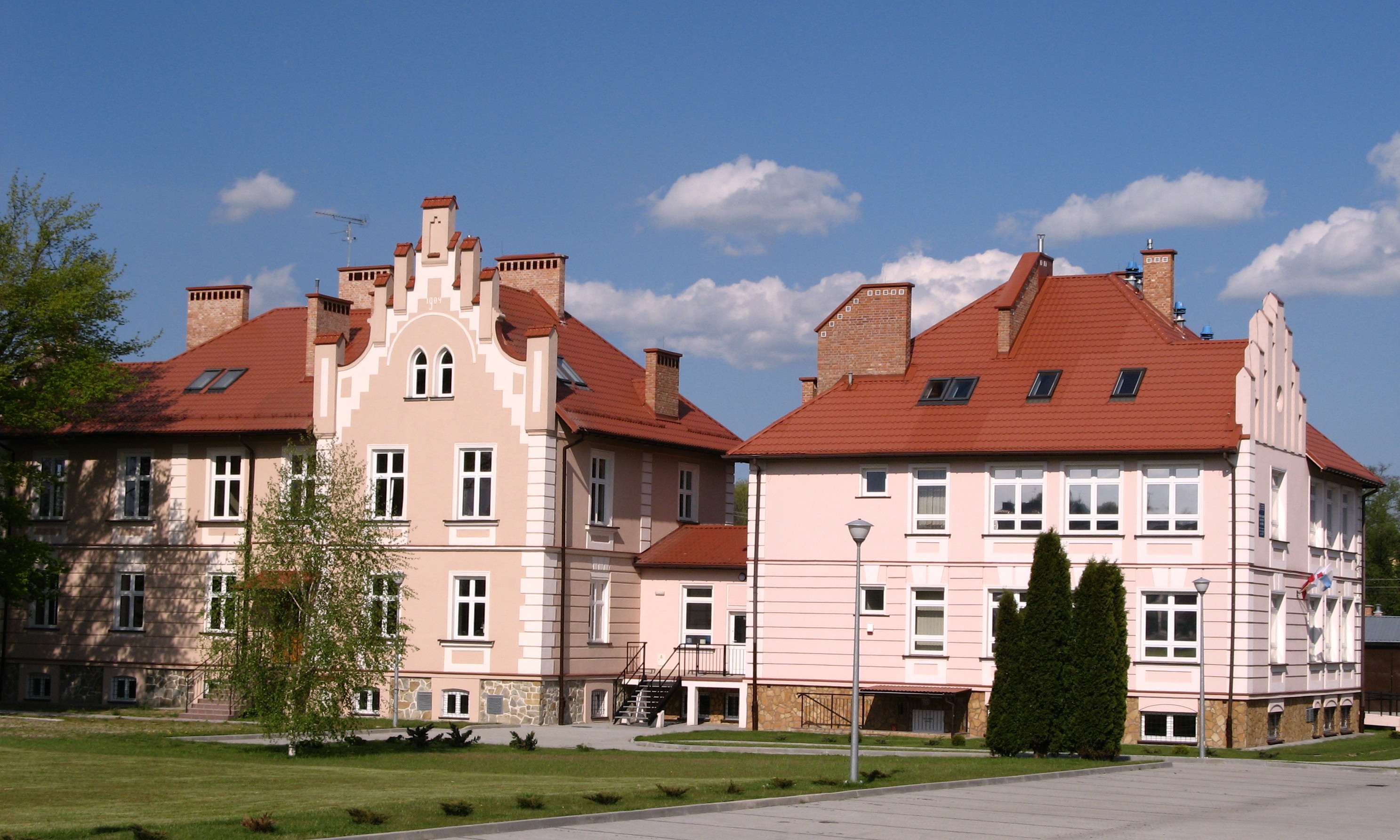
Rzeszów University of Technology

Universities:

- University of Rzeszów (established in 2001 from a number of higher education institutions)
- Rzeszów University of Technology (formed from The Higher Engineering School in 1974)
- Rzeszów University of Technology University of Information Technology and Management in Rzeszów (established in 1996)
  - Branches in Dębica, Krosno and Nisko
- Wyższa Szkoła Zarządzania
- WSPiA Rzeszów School of Higher Education (established in 1995)

Notable high schools:

- Konarski's Number 1 High School in Rzeszów
- John Paul II High School

== International relations ==
=== Consulates ===
There are honorary consulates of the Czech Republic, Germany, Hungary and Slovakia in Rzeszów.

=== Twin towns – sister cities ===
Rzeszów is twinned with:

- Bielefeld, Germany
- Buffalo, United States
- Chernihiv, Ukraine
- Fangchenggang, China
- Gainesville, United States
- Ivano-Frankivsk, Ukraine
- Klagenfurt, Austria
- Konotop, Ukraine
- Košice, Slovakia
- Lamia, Greece
- Lutsk, Ukraine
- Lviv, Ukraine
- Nyíregyháza, Hungary
- Rushmoor, England, United Kingdom
- Satu Mare, Romania
- Split, Croatia
- Truskavets, Ukraine
- Dunavarsány, Hungary

== Notable people ==
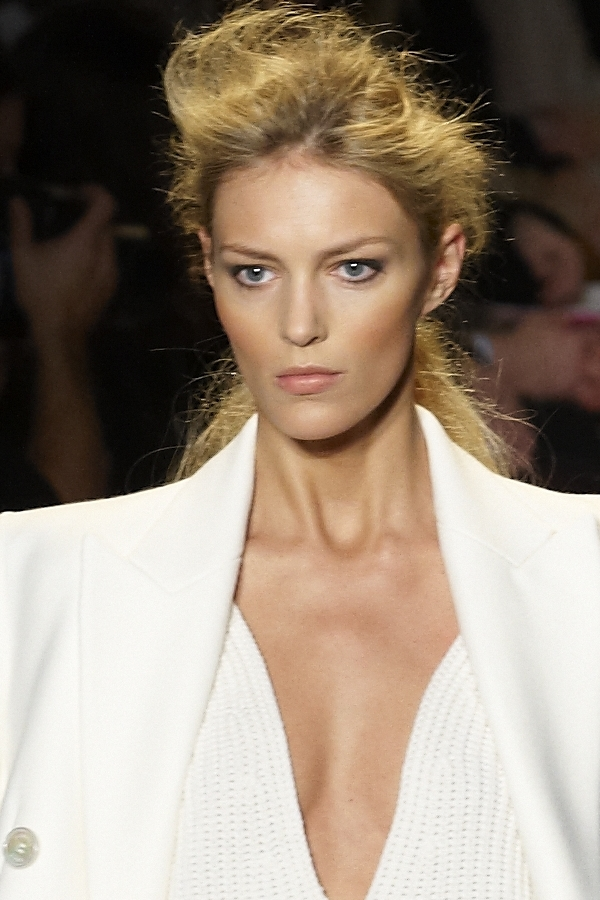
Anja Rubik

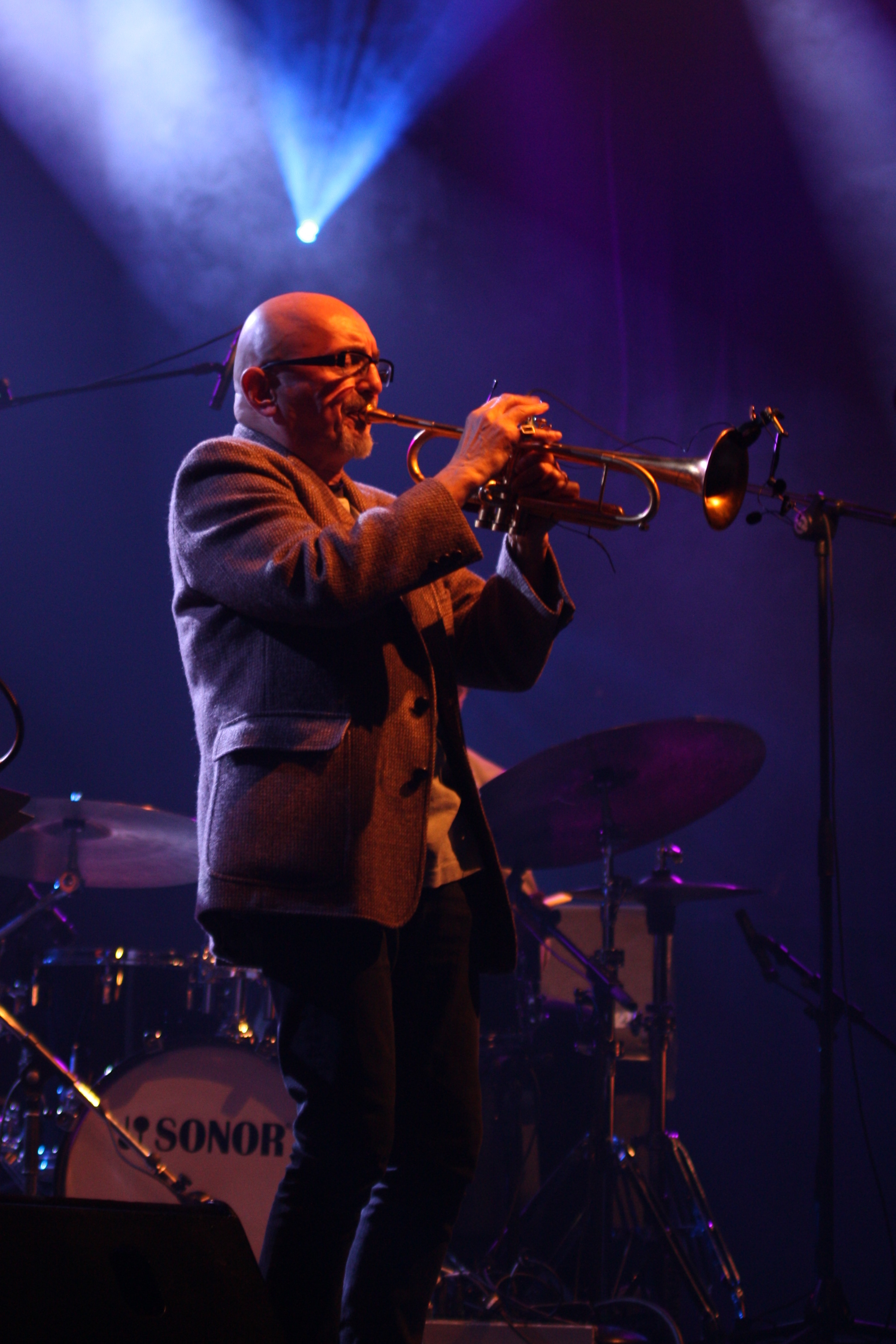
Tomasz Stańko

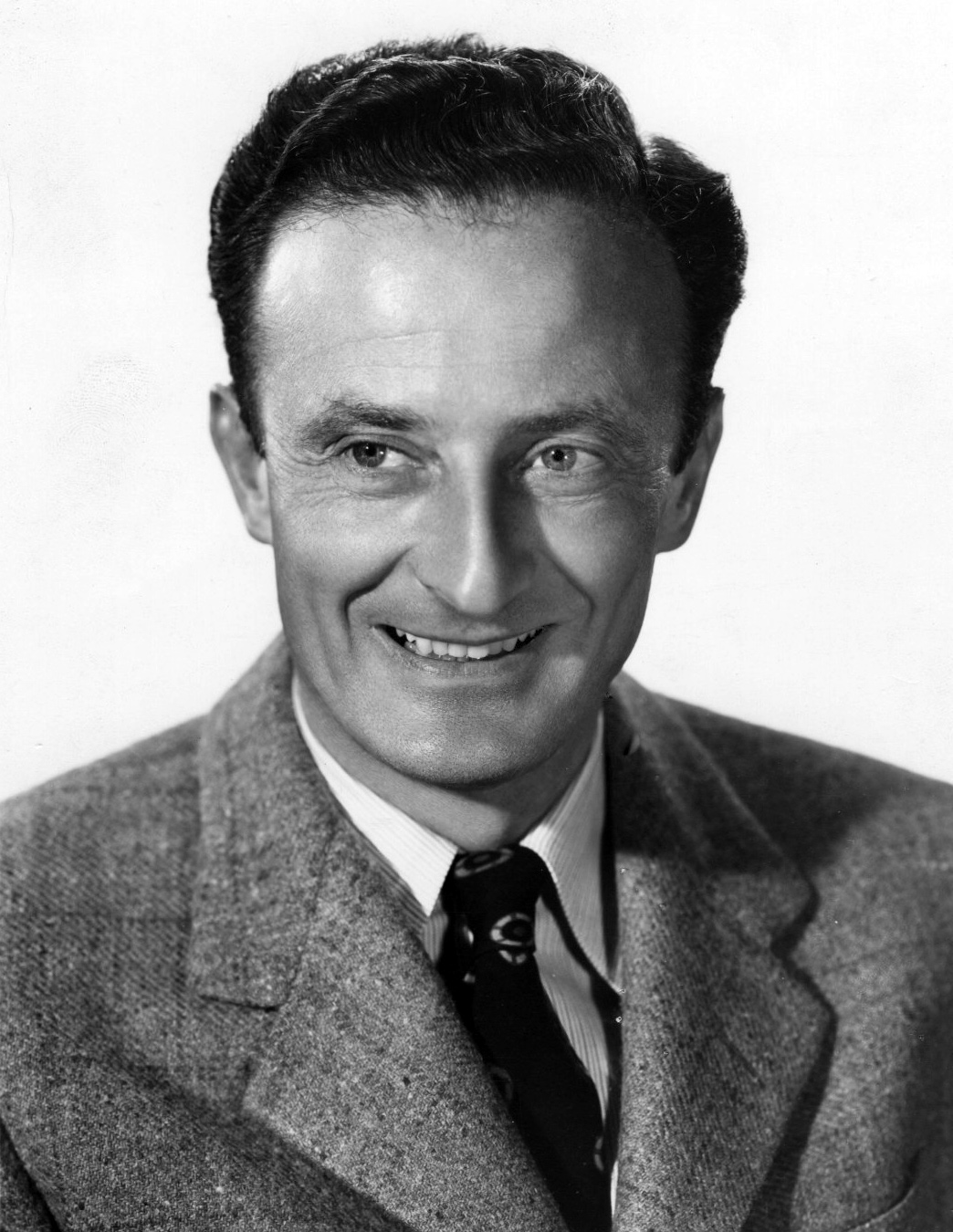
Fred Zinnemann

- Maurycy Allerhand (1868–1942), lawyer
- Jan Wojciech Balicki (1869–1948), Roman Catholic priest
- Aleksander Bobko (born 1952), politician
- Stan Borys (born 1941), singer
- Amalia Carneri (1875–1942), opera singer
- Aleksander Cichoń (born 1958), wrestler
- Lukasz Cieplinski (1913–1951), anti-Nazi and anti-Soviet resistance hero
- Jan Domarski (born 1946), footballer
- Tadeusz Ferenc (1940-2022), politician
- Wanda Gołkowska (1925–2013), artist
- Jerzy Grotowski (1933–1999), theatre director and theorist
- Hermann Horner (1892–1942), Austrian-Hungarian operatic bass-baritone
- Rafał Jonkisz (born 1997), male model
- Juliusz Kaden-Bandrowski (1885–1944), journalist and novelist
- Dawid Kostecki (1981–2019), boxer
- Paweł Kowal (born 1975), politician
- Dawid Lampart (born 1990), motorcycle speedway rider
- Joanna Lech (born 1984), poet
- Saul Lowenstam (1717–1790), Dutch rabbi and talmudist.
- Hieronim Augustyn Lubomirski (1648–1706), nobleman and military commander
- Stanisław Herakliusz Lubomirski (1642–1702), nobleman and politician
- Łukasz Łuczaj (born 1972), botanist
- Łukasz Różański (born 1986), professional boxer
- Anja Rubik (born 1983), supermodel and philanthropist
- Władysław Sikorski (1881–1943), military and political leader, statesman
- Mieczysław Boruta-Spiechowicz (1894–1985), military officer
- Tomasz Stańko (1942–2018), jazz musician and composer
- Justyna Steczkowska (born 1972), singer and songwriter
- Józef Szajna (1922–2008), set designer and painter
- Rich Szaro (1948–2015), Polish-born American football player
- Andrzej Szlachta (born 1947), politician
- Łukasz Trałka (born 1984), football pundit, commentator and former player
- Stanisław Wisłocki (1921–1998), conductor
- Konrad Wysocki (born 1982), Polish-German basketball player
- Józef Zając (1891–1963), general and pilot
- Oscar Zehngut (born 1874), violinist
- Fred Zinnemann (1907–1997), film director
