= Dinov (Hasidic dynasty) =

Polish Hasidic dynasty

Dinov (Yiddish: דינאָוו, Hebrew: דינוב) is the name of a Hasidic dynasty, descended from Rabbi Tzvi Elimelech Spira of Dinov (c. 1783 – 1841), also called "the Bnei Yisaschar" after his popular work: בני יששכר [Bene Yiśaśkhar]. Dinov is the Yiddish name of Dynów, a town in southern Poland, in the historic region of Galicia.

Notable Hasidic movements descended from the Dinov dynasty are Munkatch and Bluzhov.

== Dynasty ==
- Rebbe Tzvi Elimelech Spira of Dinov (c. 1783 – 1841)
  - Rebbe David Spira of Dinov (c. 1804 – 1874), son of Rebbe Tzvi Elimelech, author of Tsemaḥ Daṿid (צמח דוד) (Przemyśl, 1879)
    - Rebbe Yeshaya Naftali Hertz Spira of Dinov (c. 1838 – 1885), son of Rebbe David, author of Ha-Noten imre shafer (הנתן אמרי שפר) (Przemyśl, 1887–1890). He married his cousin Odel Rivka, daughter of his uncle Rebbe Elazar of Lantzut. He was a rebbe in Dinov.
    - Rebbe Tzvi Elimelech Spira of Blozhov (Błażowa) (c. 1841 – 1924), son of Rebbe David. He married the daughter of Rebbe Moshe Horowitz of Rozvadov (Rozwadow) of the Ropshitz dynasty. He was the rabbi of Ribotitsh (Rybotycze) and Blozhov until World War I, during which he fled to Budapest. After the war, he settled in Przemyśl and Reisha (Rzeszów), where he died in 1924. His responsa (Biłgoraj, 1936) and Hasidic teachings were published as Tsevi la-Tsadiḳ (צבי לצדיק). He and his descendants form the Bluzhov dynasty.
      - Rebbe Yehoshua Spira of Ribotitsh (1862–1932), son of Rebbe Tzvi Elimelech. His first wife, Miriam, was his cousin, daughter of Rebbe Menachem Mendel Mariles of Ropshitz (of the Yeruslav and Ropshitz dynasties), whose wife was the daughter of Rebbe David of Dinov. She died while giving birth to her son Meir. Rebbe Yehoshua then married Tzipora, daughter of Rebbe Yaakov Dachner, rebbe of Delatin (Deliatyn) of the Koretz dynasty. When he inherited his father's position as rabbi and rebbe of Blozhov, he was living in Reisha, where he remained until his death. Author of Ḳeren Yeshuʻah (קרן ישועה) (Biłgoraj, 1937).
        - Rebbe Yisrael Spira of Bluzhov (1889–1989), son of Rebbe Yehoshua (from his second marriage).
          - Rebbe Tzvi Yehuda Spira, Bluzhover Rebbe, stepson (and appointed successor) of Rebbe Yisrael
    - Rebbe Meir Yehuda Spira of Bikovsk (Bukowsko) (c. 1846 – 1908), son of Rebbe David. He was first married to Sheindel Rachel, daughter of Rebbe Alter Yosef Hager, the rebbe of Radovitz (Rădăuți) of the Kosov dynasty, who died in childbirth, then to her cousin Miriam, the daughter of Rebbe Yisrael of Vishnivitz (Vyshnivets) of the Zlotshov dynasty, whose wife was Rebbe Alter Yosef's sister. He was a rebbe in Bikovsk. His teachings were published in Or le-Meʼir (אור למאיר) (Przemyśl, 1913).
  - Rebbe Elazar Spira of Lantzhut (Łańcut) (c. 1808 – 1865), son of Rebbe Tzvi Elimelech, author of Yodʻe Binah (יודעי בינה) (Przemyśl, 1911)
    - Rebbe Shlomo Spira of Munkatsh (Mukachevo) (1831–1893), son of Rebbe Elazar, founder of the Munkatch dynasty. He married the daughter of Rebbe Yekusiel Shmelka Erblich of the Sasov dynasty, son of Rebbe Moshe Leib of Sasov (Sasiv, Ukraine). He was the rabbi of Strizhov (Strzyżów), Tarnogród and Munkatsh (Mukachevo). After his father's death, he was offered the rabbinate of Lantzut, but he preferred to remain in Strizhov and left the position for his brothers Rabbi Simcha and Rabbi Mendel. Author of Shem Shlomo (שם שלמה), which was never published.
      - Rebbe Tzvi Hersh Spira of Munkatsh (1850–1923), son of Rebbe Shlomo
        - Rebbe Chaim Elazar Spira of Munkatsh (1871–1937), son of Rebbe Hersh
          - Rebbe Baruch Yehoshua Yerachmiel Rabinowicz of Munkatsh (1914–1997), son-in-law of Rebbe Chaim Elazar. His father was Rebbe Nasan David Rabinowicz of Partzov of the Pshischa dynasty; his mother was the daughter of Rebbe Moshe Leib of Strizhov (below), his father-in-law's uncle.
            - Rebbe Moshe Yehuda Leib Rabinowicz, Munkatsher Rebbe, son of Rebbe Baruch
            - Rebbe Yitzchok Yaakov Rabinowicz, Dinover Rebbe, son of Rebbe Baruch
      - Rebbe Moshe Yehuda Leib Spira of Strizhov (c. 1850 – 1916), son of Rebbe Shlomo. He married Chana, the daughter of Rebbe Baruch Halberstam, rabbi and rebbe of Gorlitz (Gorlice) of the Sanz dynasty. For the first five years after his marriage, he was a member of his wife's grandfather—Rebbe Chaim Halberstam of Sanz (Nowy Sacz)'s—household. He was first the rabbi of Beitsh (Biecz), then of Sasov. In about 1882, after his father left Strizhov, he declined the town's offer that he take his place, so Rebbe Alter Horowitz (son of Rebbe Avraham of Shendishov) of the Ropshitz dynasty was appointed instead. Later Rebbe Moshe Leib returned to Strizhov, whereupon the community became divided between Rebbe Alter Horowitz's supporters and Rebbe Moshe Leib's. Rebbe Moshe Leib died in Vienna (where he fled during World War I) and was interred in Munkatsh.
    - Rebbe Tzvi Elimelech Spira of Bertsh (Bircza), son of Rebbe Elazar
      - Rebbe Mordechai Spira of Bertsh, son of Rebbe Tzvi Elimelech. His wife was Bracha, daughter of Rebbe Avraham Simcha Horowitz of Baranov (Baranów Sandomierski) of the Ropshitz dynasty. He was murdered in the Holocaust.
        - Rebbe Elazar Spira of Kivyashd Kamianske, Zakarpattia Oblast (Ukraine) (died 1973), son of Rebbe Mordechai
        - Rebbe Tzvi Elimelech Rokach (c. 1896 – 1964), Bertsher Rebbe of Brooklyn, New York, son-in-law of Rebbe Mordechai. His father was Rebbe Yosef Yehuda Rokach of Libetshoiv (Lubaczów) of the Belz dynasty, and on his mother side he was himself a descendant of the Dinov dynasty through his grandfather Rabbi Menachem Pinchas (Mendel) Spira, the rabbi of Lantzut.
      - Rebbe Yosef Spira of Dinov (died 1932), son of Rebbe Tzvi Elimelech. He married the daughter of his cousin, Rebbe Yeshaya Naftali Hirtz of Dinov, and succeeded him as the rabbi of Dinov in about 1885.
    - Rabbi Simcha Spira of Lantzhut, son of Rebbe Elazar. He married the daughter of Rabbi Yisrael Leib Wahrman of Butshotsh (Buchach), son of Rebbe Avraham David Wahrman, rabbi and rebbe of Butshotsh. He and his brother Rabbi Mendel both claimed the rabbinate of Lantzut, and both were treated as such. Rabbi Simcha had the support of the Hasidic community.
      - Rebbe Elazar Spira (the second) of Lantzhut (died 1938), son of Rabbi Simcha
      - Rebbe Eliezer Rubin of Baligród, (Note: In ha-Ḥasidut mi-dor le-dor, Alfasi writes that he was the son-in-law of Rebbe Mendel Rubin of Glogov of the Ropshitz dynasty, and so includes Rebbe Eliezer and his sons in the Ropshitz dynasty. However, in his Entsiḳlopedyah la-Ḥasidut he agrees with the other sources.) son-in-law of Rabbi Simcha. (Note: Alfasi, Rand, and Vunder write that Rebbe Eliezer's father-in-law was Rabbi Simcha of Lantzut; later, Vunder retracts and writes that his father-in-law was Rebbe Elazar of Lantzut (Rabbi Simcha's father). Rebbe Avraham David Rubin's own tombstone, however, agrees with Alfasi and Rand.) He was a descendant of Rebbe Menachem Mendel of Linsk, (Note: Rebbe Eliezer's ancestor "Rebbe Menachem Mendel of Linsk" can be identified either with Rebbe Mendel Rubin (or Rabin), the rabbi of Linsk (Lesko), father of Rebbe Naftali Tzvi Horowitz of Ropshitz, or with Rebbe Menachem Mendel Horowitz, rabbi and rebbe of Linsk, Rebbe Naftali Tzvi's grandson. In Volume 2 of Meʼore Galitsyah, Ṿunder writes that Rebbe Eliezer was the son of Rebbe Avraham Chaim Horowitz (the second) of Linsk, son of Rebbe Menachem Mendel Horowitz of Linsk. In Volume 4, he writes that Rebbe Eliezer succeeded his father, Rabbi Menachem Mendel Rubin—who was the grandson of Rebbe Naftali Tzvi of Ropshitz's brother—as the rabbi and rebbe of Baligrod.) and inherited from his ancestors the rabbinate of Baligród, of which he was rebbe as well. He died prematurely, and his sons Yisrael Leib and Avraham David were raised by his father-in-law and by Rebbe Avraham Mordechai Rosenfeld, the rabbi and rebbe of Moshtshisk (Mostyska).
        - Rebbe Yisrael Leib Rubin (died 1961), Baligroder Rebbe of Brooklyn, New York, son of Rebbe Eliezer. In 1914, he settled in Vienna, where he had a synagogue. He fled from the Nazis before the Holocaust and settled in Brooklyn, where he died in 1955.
        - Rebbe Avraham David Rubin (c. 1887 – 1963), Lantzuter Rebbe of New York, son of Rebbe Eliezer. In around 1906, he married Toba Chava, daughter of his uncle, Rebbe Shalom Rubin of Reisha (Rzeszów) of the Ropshitz dynasty, whose wife Chana Mindel was also Rebbe Simcha Spira's daughter. He was a rebbe in Rzeszów until about 1928. In approximately 1929 he emigrated to the United States, where he became the rebbe of the Lantzut synagogue.
    - Rabbi Menachem Pinchas (Mendel) Spira of Lantzut. As mentioned above, he and his brother Rabbi Simcha both claimed the rabbinate of Lantzut. Rabbi Mendel had the support of the non-Hasidic community.
      - Rabbi Shmuel Spira of Redim (Radymno), son of Rabbi Mendel. He married the daughter of Rebbe Yaakov Yosef Rubin, rabbi and rebbe of Glogov (Głogów Małopolski) of the Ropshitz dynasty. From about 1885, he was for some time the rabbi of Glogov in his father-in-law's place; later he officiated as the rabbi of Redim.
      - Rabbi Chaim Reuven Wagschal of Lantzut, son-in-law of Rabbi Mendel. He was a descendant of the Lizhensk dynasty. He was first the dayan, then the rabbi, of Lantzut.
        - Rabbi Alter Yaakov Yitzchak Wagschal of Lantzut, son of Rabbi Chaim Reuven. He married Dina, daughter of Rabbi Yitzchak Rubin of Safed of the Ropshitz dynasty. Like his father, he was the dayan, and then the rabbi, of Lantzut.
          - Rebbe Avraham Menachem Mendel Wagschal, Shinover Rebbe of Monsey, New York, son of Rabbi Alter. He married Shifra Nechama, daughter of Rebbe Yissachar Ber Rothenberg, Voidaslover Rebbe of the Apt (Or la-Shomayim) dynasty.
          - Rebbe Yehoshua Wagschal, Lantzuter Rebbe of Williamsburg, Brooklyn, New York, son of Rabbi Alter. He married Chaya, daughter of Rebbe Yaakov Halberstam of Tshakova of the Sanz dynasty).
