= Mordecai Jonah Rosenfeld =

Galician religious leader and Hebrew writer

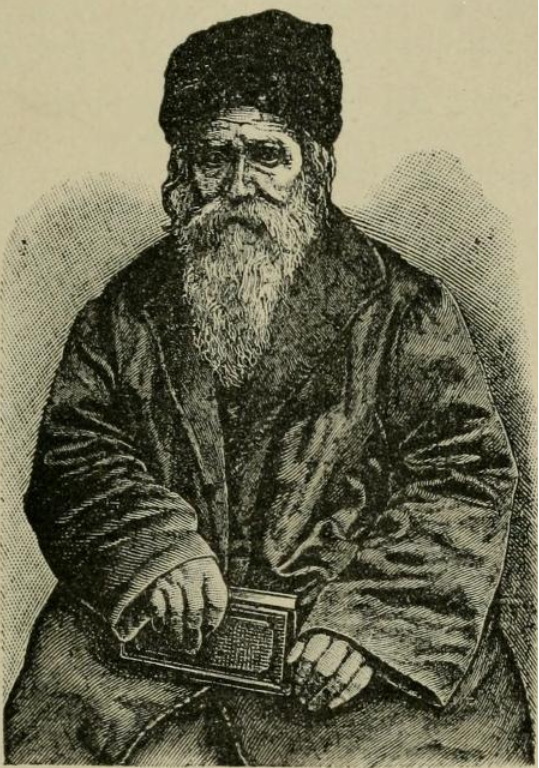
- Born: 21 October 1797; Dynów, Galicia, Habsburg Empire
- Died: 5 June 1885 (aged 87); Sośnica or Przemyśl, Galicia, Austria-Hungary
- Writing career
- Pen name: Mishuv (מישו״ב)
- Language: Hebrew

Mordecai Jonah Rosenfeld (Hebrew: מרדכי יונה ראזענפעלד; 21 October 1797 – 5 June 1885), also known by the acronym Mishuv (Hebrew: מישו״ב, short for מרדכי יונה שוחט ובודק, "Mordecai Jonah the Shoḥet and Bodek"), was a Galician religious leader and Hebrew writer.

== Biography ==
Born in Dynów, he moved to Przemyśl at the age of seven and then Brody, where he studied the Talmud, Hebrew and German. Among his teachers was Tzvi Elimelech Spira, the first Dinover Rebbe. In about 1830 he became shoḥet at Sośnica, and remained there for the rest of his life.

Rosenfeld's philosophy was influenced by the work of Nachman Krochmal. He was the author of En boḥen (Przemyśl, 1872), a commentary on Beḥinat olam; Or karov (Przemyśl, 1873), a commentary on Or ha-ḥayyim by Joseph Yabez, with an appendix on the origin of Kabbalah; and an edition of the Book of Job with commentary (Kenaf renanim) and philological notes (Hokhaḥ milim; Lemberg, 1875). In addition to these works he contributed articles to such periodicals as Ha-Maggid and Ha-Ivri. The most important of these was Netinah la-kohen, strictures on Netinah la-ger by Nathan Marcus Adler.

== Bibliography ==
- Ayin boḥen [Investigative Eye]. Przemyśl: Ḥayyim Aharon Zupnik. 1872.
- Or karov [A Close Light]. Ḥayyim Aharon Zupnik. 1873.
- Sefer Iyov [The Book of Job] (PDF). Lemberg: Jacob Ehrenpreis. 1875.
