= Bluzhev (Hasidic dynasty) =

Polish Hasidic dynasty

Bluzhev Hasidic Dynasty
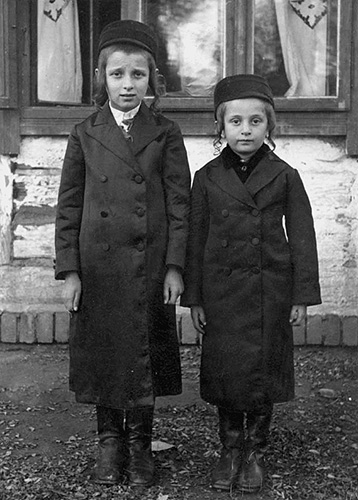
- Hasidic children in Błażowa in the 1930s

Founder
- Rabbi Tzvi Elimelech Spira

Regions with significant populations
- Israel, United States, Poland

Religions
- Hasidic Judaism

Languages
- Yiddish, Hebrew

Related ethnic groups
- Dinov, Munkatch

Bluzhev (also spelled Bluzhov or Bluzov) is a Hasidic dynasty originating in Błażowa, Poland and currently based in Brooklyn, NY. Founded by Rabbi Tzvi Elimelech Spira in the early 1880s, it was destroyed during the Holocaust and reestablished in the United States by Rabbi Yisroel Spira. In 2015, after the death of Grand Rabbi Tzvi Yehuda Spira, the court splintered into three smaller groups, one retaining the name Bluzev and the others going under the names Ribatitch and Bluzhev. All are centered in Brooklyn.

== History ==
=== Tzvi LaTzaddik ===
The founding Admor of the dynasty was Rabbi Tzvi Elimelech Spira. He was born in 1841 to Rabbi Dovid and Rochel Spira. His father was the rebbe of Dinov, having gotten the position from his father, the first Rabbi Tzvi Elimelech Spira (known as the Bnei Yissoschor).

A student of Rabbi Chaim Halberstam of Sanz, Rabbi Spira served as the rebbe of Ribatitch before assuming the position of rabbi of Bluzhov (the Yiddish name for Błażowa). During World War I, he fled to the nearby city of Rzeszów (Reisha) where he died in 1924. He is commonly remembered as the Tzvi LaTzaddik, the name of the sefer he authored.

=== Keren Yeshua ===
After the death of the Tzvi LaTzaddik, his son, Rabbi Yehoshua Spira, who had also formerly served as rebbe in Ribatitch, succeeded him as rebbe of the Bluzhev dynasty, continuing to lead the court in Rzeszów. Like his father, he is often referred to by the name of his sefer, titled Keren Yeshuah. He died on February 19, 1932.

=== Rabbis Meir and Eliezer Spira ===
The Keren Yeshuah was succeeded by his son Rabbi Meir Spira, who continued to lead the court in Rzeszów (he had previously served as rabbi of Błażowa). Another son, Rabbi Eliezer Spira, served as rebbe of Ribatitch. They both were murdered in the Holocaust.

=== Rabbi Yisroel Spira ===
Born in 1889, he was a son of the Keren Yeshuah. He served as the rebbe of Istrik where he attracted many chassidim, including followers of his father and grandfather (the Keren Yeshuah and Tzvi LaTzaddik). He survived the Holocaust in the Bergen-Belsen concentration camp, and after the war, moved to the United States. There, he reestablished the Bluzhev chassidus in Brooklyn. He died in 1989 at the age of 100 and was buried on Mount of Olives.

=== Rabbi Tzvi Yehudah Spira ===
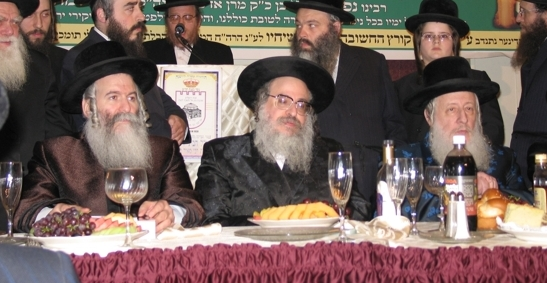
(L-R) Rabbi Bentzion Aryeh Leibish Halberstam of Bobov, Rabbi Shmuel Dovid Halberstam of Klausenburg, and Rabbi Tzvi Yehudah Spira of Bluzhev

Born in Germany in 1936 into the Kushitzki family, his father was killed in the Holocaust. He reunited with his mother after World War II who went on to marry Rabbi Yisroel Spira, hence his surname being changed from Kushitzki to Spira. After his step-father's death, he was appointed the next rebbe of Bluzhev. He also served as nasi (president) of Kolel Chibas Yerushalayim. He died in 2015 and was buried on Mount of Olives. At his funeral, it was announced that his successor would be his oldest son Rabbi Avrohom Yaakov Spira, and will lead his bais medrash in Borough Park.

=== Present-day ===
Rabbi Tzvi Yehudah Spira was succeeded by his three sons, Rabbis Avraham Yaakov, Moshe Menachem, and Yehoshua Yosef Spira. While the oldest son, Rabbi Avraham Yaakov, went on to lead from the same beis midrash as his father and step-grandfather, the second and third sons led their own congregations, under the names "BLUZHEV" and "Bluzhev-Ribatitch", respectively.

== Lineage of Bluzhev dynasty ==
- Rabbi Tzvi Elimelech Spira I of Dinov (1783–1841), Bnei Yissoschar
  - Rabbi Dovid Spira of Dinov [HE] (1804–1874), Tzemach Dovid
    - Rabbi Tzvi Elimelech Spira II of Bluzhev [HE] (1841–1924), Tzvi LaTzaddik, first Bluzhever Rebbe
      - Rabbi Yehoshua Spira of Ribatitch and Bluzhev [HE] (1862–1932), Keren Yeshua, second Bluzhever Rebbe
        - Rabbi Meir Spira of Bluzhev [HE] (d. c. 1941), third Bluzhever Rebbe
        - Rabbi Eliezer Spira of Ribatitch (1885–1941)
        - Rabbi Yisroel Spira of Bluzhev, fourth Bluzhever Rebbe, reestablished court in the United States
          - Rabbi Tzvi Yehudah Spira of Bluzhev, fifth Bluzhever Rebbe
            - Rabbi Avraham Yaakov Spira of Bluzhev, sixth Bluzhever Rebbe
            - Rabbi Moshe Menachem Spira of Bluzhev Bluzhever rebbe
            - Rabbi Yehoshua Yosef Spira of Bluzhev-Ribatitch

== See also ==
- Dinov (Hasidic dynasty)
- Munkatch (Hasidic dynasty)
