= Yisrael Spira =

Polish-American rabbi (1889–1989)

Rabbi Yisroel Spira

Personal life
- Born: November 12, 1889
- Died: October 30, 1989 (aged 99)
- Dynasty: Bluzhov

Religious life
- Religion: Judaism
- Denomination: Hasidic Judaism
- Organisation: Moetzes Gedolei HaTorah
- Dynasty: Bluzhov

Yisroel Spira (November 12, 1889 – October 30, 1989), the Bluzhover Rebbe, was a senior member of Moetzes Gedolei HaTorah, and a Holocaust survivor. His experiences in the Nazi concentration camps were the basis for the book Hasidic Tales of the Holocaust.

== Early life and family ==
Spira was born in Reisha (Rzeszów), Galicia, southern Poland, to Yehoshua Spira, the "Keren Yehoshua" of Ribiditsch, and Tziporah. Yehoshua Spira was the son of Tzvi Elimelech Spira of Bluzhov (Błażowa in Polish) (1841–1924), also known by the eponym Tzvi LaTzaddik (Hebrew צבי לצדיק), after his major work. Tzvi Elimelech Spira was the son of the Tzemach Dovid (Heb. צמח דוד) of Dinov, who in turn was the son of Tzvi Elimelech Spira of Dynów (1783–1841), the author of Bnei Yisaschar (Heb. בני יששכר).

Spira married Perel Unger, the daughter of Shalom David Unger, the Zashavna Rebbe.

== Career ==
Spira was ordained at the young age of thirteen by the Maharsham of Brezan (Berezhany). He served as the rabbi of Pruchnik, and was later appointed rabbi of Ustrzyki Dolne, near Sanok, in southeastern Poland. After his father's death in 1931, Spira became Rebbe of Bluzhov.

== World War II ==
As a result of the Nazi occupation of Poland, the Jews were first herded into ghettos, then suffered deportation to destinations yet unknown. Spira was sent to the Janowska concentration camp. In October 1942, he was transferred to Bełżec, but he was subsequently able to escape back to Janowska. He would later be transferred to Bergen-Belsen

On October 31, 1942, Spira's wife Perel was killed by the Nazis. The rest of his family, among them his brothers, Rabbi Eliezer of Ribaditch, and Rabbi Meir of Bluzhev, were all killed by the Nazis.

On April 15, 1945, Spira was liberated from Bergen-Belsen.

After the war, Spira married his second wife, Rebbetzin Bronia Spira (Melchior) (b. June 2, 1910) from Sosnowiec. Her first husband, Rabbi Yisroel Avrohom Koshitzki, perished in the Bełżec extermination camp.

== Post-war ==
Spira relocated to the United States, at first settling in the Williamsburg section of Brooklyn, New York, and later in Borough Park.

Spira played an important role in the development of Agudath Israel of America.

== Death ==
Spira died on October 30, 1989. He was the senior member of the Moetzes Gedolei HaTorah. Rabbi Yitzchok Brandriss, spokesman for the Moetzes, said that Spira was the oldest living Hasidic Rabbi.

Spira was buried on the Mount of Olives in Jerusalem.

== Legacy ==
Stories about Spira's experiences during the Holocaust were told over to Holocaust researcher Yaffa Eliach. These stories would later become the basis for her book Hasidic Tales of the Holocaust.

In 2005, Spira's grandson, Rabbi Yoseph Spira, compiled two volumes of his grandfather's Torah thoughts, called Shufra Deyisroel (Heb. שופרא דישראל). He also wrote a biography called LeAid Bivney Yisroel (Heb. לעד בבני ישראל).

== See also ==
- Yekusiel Yehudah Halberstam
