= Judge Drain =

Judge Drain may refer to:

- Gershwin A. Drain (born 1949), judge of the United States District Court for the Eastern District of Michigan
- Robert D. Drain (born c. 1957), judge of the United States Bankruptcy Court for the Southern District of New York
