= Janowska concentration camp =

Nazi concentration camp in Ukraine (1941–1944)

Janowska
- Concentration camp
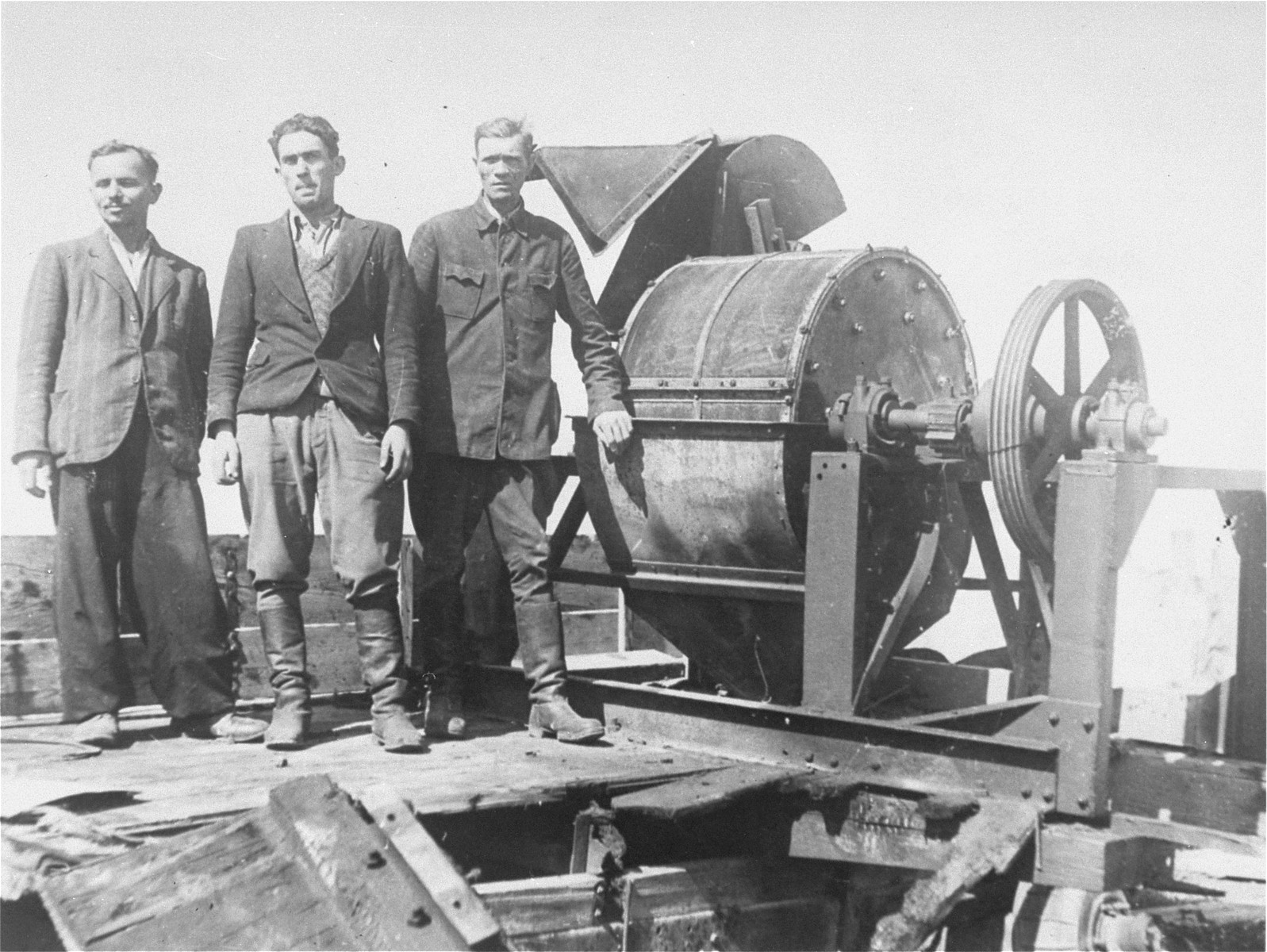
- Survivors of the camp's Sonderkommando 1005 unit stand next to a bone crushing machine (taken following the liberation of the camp in 1944)

- Location of Janowska camp in modern Ukraine
- Coordinates: 49.85417°N 23.99000°E
- Location: Lemberg, District of Galicia, General Government (formerly Lwów, Second Polish Republic; today Lviv, Ukraine)
- Operated by: SS
- Operational: September 1941 – July 1944
- Inmates: Primarily Jews
- Number of inmates: 100,000+ (estimated)
- Killed: 35,000–40,000 (estimated)
- Liberated by: The Red Army
- Website: encyclopedia.ushmm.org/content/en/article/janowska

Janowska concentration camp (Polish: Janowska, Russian: Янов or "Yanov", Ukrainian: Янівський табір) was a German Nazi concentration camp combining elements of labor, transit, and extermination camps. It was established in September 1941 on the outskirts of Lwów in what had become, after the German invasion, the General Government (today: Lviv, Ukraine). The camp was named after the nearby street Janowska in Lwów of the interwar Second Polish Republic.

The Germans liquidated the camp in November 1943, with the evidence of mass murder being largely destroyed in the Nazi program of Sonderaktion 1005. Estimates put the total number of prisoners who passed through the Janowska camp at between 100,000 and 120,000, mostly Polish and Soviet Jews. The number of victims murdered at the camp is estimated at 35,000–40,000.

== Background ==
Lwów (now Lviv) was a multicultural city just before World War II, with a population of 312,231. The city's 157,490 ethnic Poles constituted over 50 per cent, with Jews at 32 per cent (99,595) and Ukrainians at 16 per cent (49,747). After the joint Soviet-German invasion of Poland on 1 and 17 September 1939, the USSR and Nazi Germany signed the German–Soviet Frontier Treaty on 28 September 1939, which assigned about 200,000 km^{2} (77,000 sq mi) of Polish territory inhabited by 13.5 million people of all nationalities to the Soviet Union. Lwów was then annexed to the Soviet Union as part of the Ukrainian SSR.

At the time of the German attack on the Soviet Union in June 1941, about 160,000 Jews lived in the city; the number had swelled by tens of thousands due to the arrival of Jewish refugees from German-occupied western Poland in September 1939. Lviv was occupied by the Wehrmacht on 30 June 1941. Jews were press-ganged by the Germans to remove bodies of the victims of the NKVD prisoner massacres, for which German Nazi propaganda and Ukrainian nationalists blamed the Jews. In the ensuing July pogroms and the concurrent Einsatzgruppen murders, Ukrainian nationalists and Germans murdered thousands of Jews.

== Lwów Ghetto ==
In early November 1941, the Germans closed-off northern portions of the city, thus forming the Lwów Ghetto. During the forced relocation of Jewish families to the newly created ghetto, German police shot and murdered thousands of elderly and sick Jews as they crossed under the rail bridge on Pełtewna Street (which came to be known as the bridge of death for the Jews). Several months later, in March 1942, German police under the SS and Police Leader of the District of Galicia SS-Brigadeführer Fritz Katzmann, began to deport Jews from the ghetto to the German Nazi Belzec extermination camp. By August 1942, more than 65,000 Jews from Lwów had been sent away aboard Holocaust trains and murdered. In early June 1943, the Germans destroyed and liquidated the ghetto.

== Labour and transit camp ==
In addition to the Lwów ghetto, in September 1941 the occupation authorities set up a German Armament Works D.A.W. factory (Deutsche Ausrüstungswerke) in prewar Steinhaus Milling Machines Merchants (Maszyny młyńskie – Sprzedaż) on 134 Janowska Street (Grodecka 10a address), in northwestern suburbs of Lwów. This factory became a part of a network of factories owned and operated by the SS. The commandant of the camp was SS-Haupsturmführer Fritz Gebauer. The Germans used Jews who worked at this factory as forced laborers, mainly working in carpentry and metalwork.

In October 1941, the Germans established a concentration camp next to the factory, which housed the forced laborers along with other prisoners. Thousands of Jews from the Lwów ghetto were forced to work as slave laborers in this complex. When the Germans liquidated the Lwów ghetto, the ghetto's inhabitants who were fit for work were sent to the Janowska camp; the rest were deported to the German Nazi death camp Belzec for extermination. The concentration camp was guarded by a Sonderdienst battalion of the SS-trained Hiwi guards known as "Trawniki men", drawn from Soviet POWs.

In addition to being a forced-labor camp for Jews, Janowska was a transit camp during the mass deportations of Polish Jews to the killing centers in 1942 from across German-occupied southeastern Poland (now western Ukraine). Jews underwent a selection process in Janowska camp similar to that used at Auschwitz–Birkenau and Majdanek German extermination camps. Those classified as fit to work remained at Janowska for forced labor. The majority, rejected as unfit for work, were deported to Belzec and murdered, or else were shot at the Piaski ravine, located just north of the camp. In the summer and fall of 1942, thousands of Jews (mainly from the Lwów ghetto) were deported to Janowska and murdered in the Piaski ravine.

== Liquidation ==
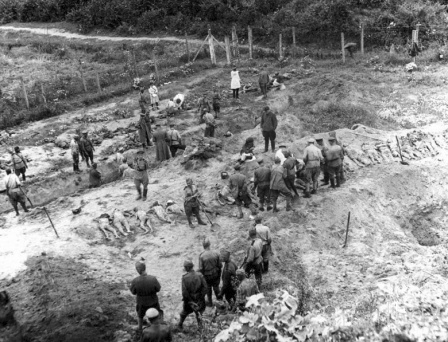
Soviet Extraordinary State Commission at the site of mass graves adjoining the camp, 1944.

Ahead of the Soviet advance, in November 1943 the camp commandant SS-Hauptsturmführer Friedrich Warzok was put in charge of the evacuation of the Janowska inmates to Przemyśl. The Germans attempted to destroy the traces of mass murder during Sonderaktion 1005. Prisoners were forced to open the mass graves in Lysynychi forest 5 kilometres (3.1 mi) east of Lwów ghetto and burn the bodies. On 19 November 1943 the Sonderkommando inmates staged a revolt against the Germans and attempted a mass escape. Around 120 men succeeded in escaping, but many were recaptured and murdered. At the time of the camp's liquidation, the SS and their local auxiliaries murdered at least 6,000 Jews who had survived the uprising killings at Janowska, as well as Jews in other forced labor camps in Galicia.

The Soviet Extraordinary State Commission determined that over 200,000 people were murdered in Janowska in the course of the camp operation but this number is inflated. The actual death toll was between 40,000 and 80,000. The ashes mixed with crushed bones were buried to a depth of six feet (2 m) in various places. Leon Weliczker Wells told the Commission that between 6 June and 20 November 1943 his "team burned more than 310,000 bodies", including 170,000 in the immediate vicinity of the camp and another 140,000 or more in the Lysynychi area of eastern Lwów. Weliczker repeated the claim of "a few hundred thousand" at Adolf Eichmann's trial in 1961. Weliczker also described his work as part of the Sonderaktion 1005 in his memoir Death Brigade (The Janowska road) (1978).

Remaining facilities at Janowska were used by the Soviets as a prison camp after its liberation in 1944.

== Postwar Justice ==
A number of the perpetrators from the Janowska camp were tried by various courts after the war. The Lemberg Prozess (Lviv Trial) which opened in Stuttgart in 1966 tried eight former Janowska SS men of whom five were convicted. The Stuttgart Lviv Trial was the second largest Nazi trial in German history.

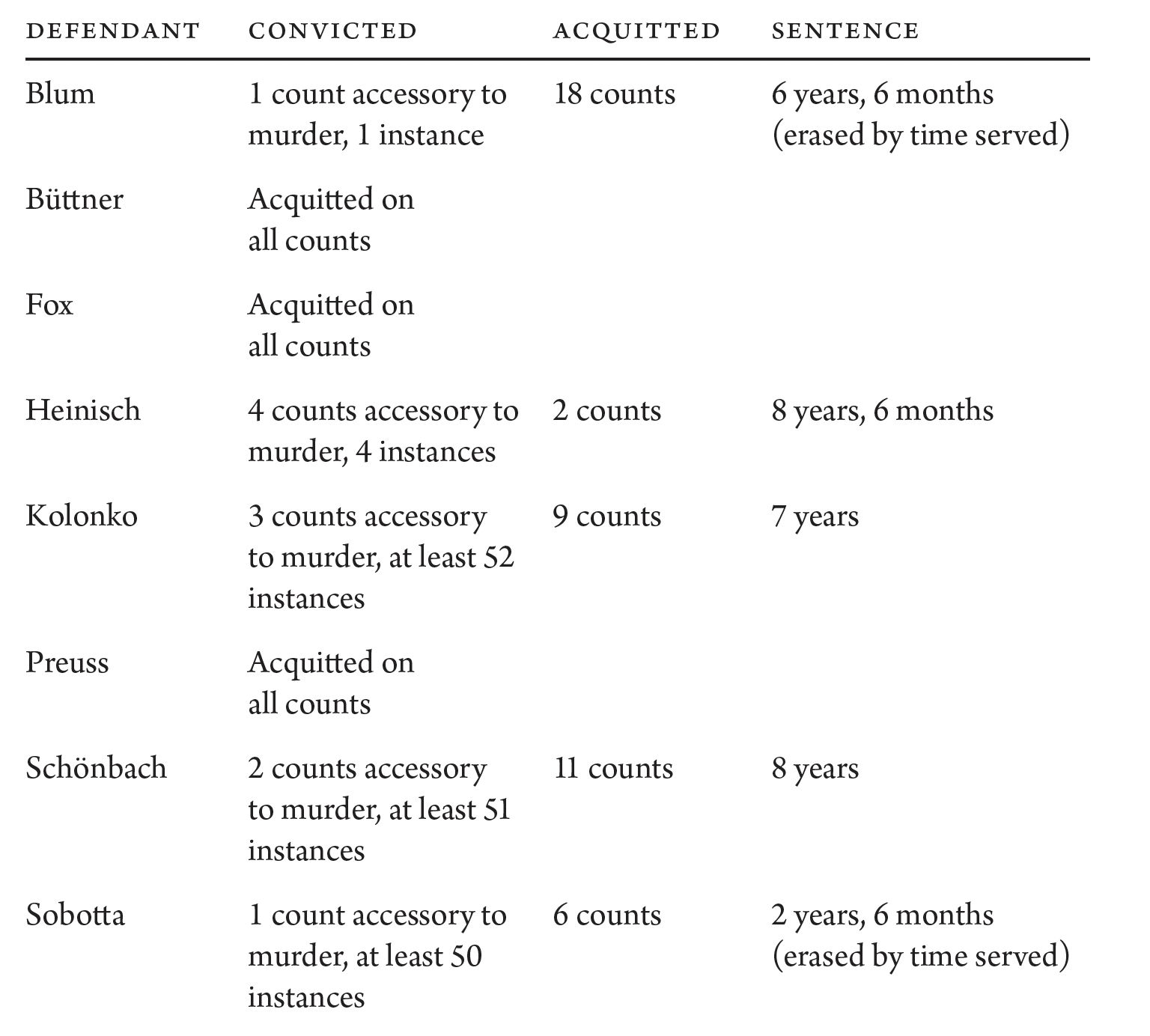
Trial outcomes for former Janowska SS men at the 1966 Stuttgart Lviv Trial.

== Tango of Death ==
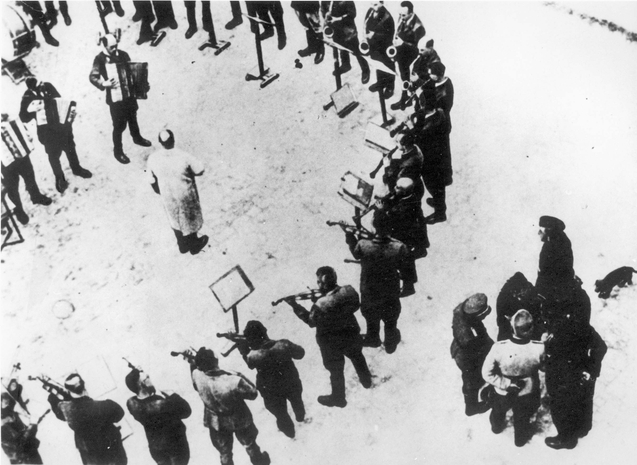
Tango of Death

In the Janowska concentration camp, the Germans conducted torture and executions to music. The orchestra members, inmates of the camp, were required to always play the same tune, "Tango of Death". Pre-war Polish Lwów Municipal Theater's noted Jewish musicians were among the members. Simon Wiesenthal claimed lyrics of the "Tango of Death" were written by Emanuel Szlechter, inmate of the camp and writer of lyrics to several Polish pre-war hit songs.

Shortly before the liberation of Lviv, all orchestra musicians were shot. According to Ukrainian survivor Bohdan Kokh: "The most terrible day was the last one, when 25,000 Jews were shot...This operation ended with the last orchestra coming to the pit; they were undressed, they laid down their instruments; they went into the pit, but before that they played the 'Tango of Death' for themselves."

A photo of the orchestra players was one of the incriminating documents at the Nuremberg trials.

Jakub Mund's story is described in the book called Tango of Death.

== Notable inmates ==
- Maurycy Allerhand, Polish lawyer
- Adolf Beck, Polish physiologist
- Janina Hescheles (later Altman), Polish-Israeli chemist and writer
- Rabbi Yisroel Spira, Grand Rabbi of Bluzev (Błażowa)
- Emanuel Szlechter, Polish screenwriter and lyricist
- William Ungar, founder of the National Envelope Corporation
- Debora Vogel, Polish philosopher and poet
- Simon Wiesenthal, later Nazi hunter

== Literature ==
- Beorn, Waitman Wade (2024). Between the wires: the Janowska camp and the Holocaust in Lviv. Lincoln: University of Nebraska Press. ISBN 978-1-4962-3759-0.
- Kaplan, Helene C. (1989). I never left Janowska. New York: Holocaust Library. ISBN 978-0-89604-139-4.
- Wells, Leon Weliczker (1999). The Janowska road. Washington, D.C: United States Holocaust Memorial Museum. ISBN 978-0-89604-159-2.

== See also ==
- Kaiser Wilhelm Institute of Anthropology, Human Heredity, and Eugenics
- List of Nazi concentration camps
- Nazi concentration camps
