= Yanov Torah =

Hand-written copy of the Torah

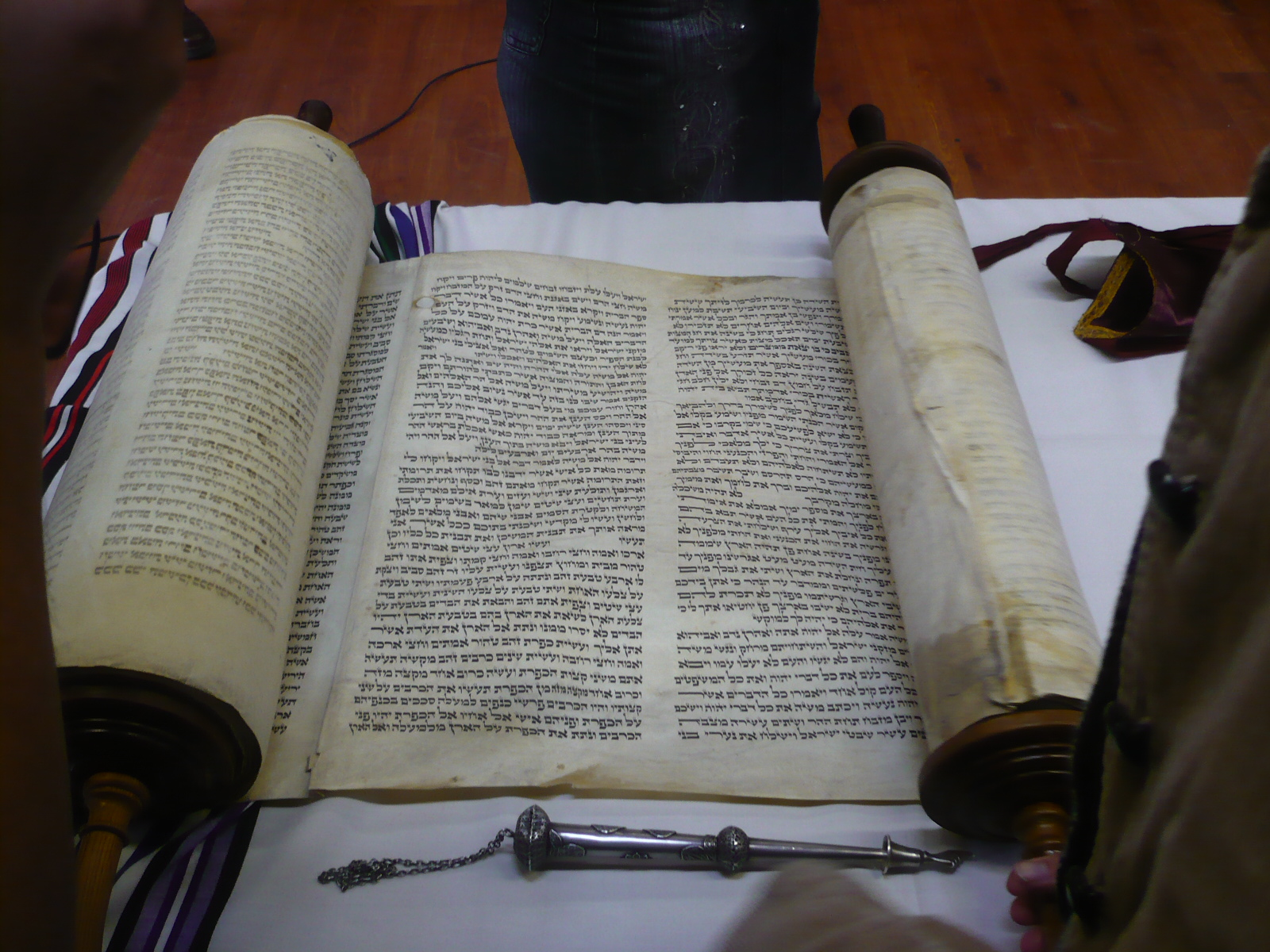
- The Yanov Torah displayed to seminary students at InterSem 2009 in Malibu, California
- Editor: Rabbi Erwin Herman
- Language: Hebrew
- Published: Janowska concentration camp survivors
- Publication place: United States

The Yanov Torah is a hand-written copy of the Torah assembled from the individual sheaves of Torah manuscripts, smuggled into the Janowska concentration camp during the Holocaust in World War II. The Janowska, also known as the Yanov death camp, located not far from the Lwów Ghetto, was a place of execution of tens of thousands of Polish Jews between September 1941 and November 1943. A Sefer Torah, the holiest book within Judaism venerated by Jews, was reassembled by prisoners from manuscripts unearthed at Lwów's Jewish cemetery. Following World War II, it was smuggled out of the then Soviet Union and brought to Los Angeles. It has been donated to the rabbinical programs at Hebrew Union College, where it is taken on tour to various synagogues and assemblies so that the story of its history can be told.

== History ==
The published book, entitled the Yanov Torah, is written by Rabbi Erwin Herman, then director of the Pacific Southwest Council of the UAHC (now URJ). Herman describes how the Yanov Torah was brought to him by Dr. Emanuel Orlove (a pseudonym), who smuggled the Torah out of the Soviet Union when he emigrated to America in 1980. Dr. Orlove also tells the history of how the pages were smuggled into the work camp, and how they were collected and reunited—to be stitched back into a whole Torah scroll.

== See also ==
- Sefer Torah
