= Maurycy Allerhand =

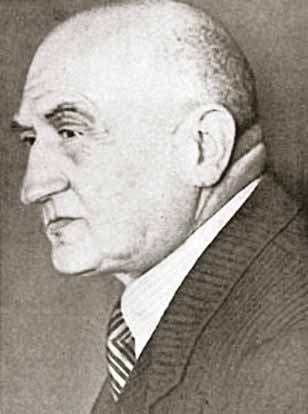
- Born: 28 June 1868; Rzeszów
- Died: c. 10 August 1942 (aged 74); Janowska concentration camp
- Writing career
- Notable works: Zapiski z tamtego świata (Notes from the Other World); Deception in courts

Maurycy Allerhand (June 28, 1868 – c. August 10, 1942) was a Polish lawyer and the Professor of Law at the Lviv University (then John Casimir University). His authored more than 1,000 works including publications in the field of procedural law as well as civil and commercial ethnography. He was murdered in Belzec during the Holocaust.

== Biography ==
Allerhand was born into a Jewish landowner's family in Rzeszów. He graduated from high school in Rzeszów, and later studied at the University of Vienna. He obtained his Ph.D. there in 1892. After his return to Galicia under Austrian rule, Allerhand settled in Lviv and began a law practice. In 1900 he opened an independent law firm, but also, kept publishing his treatise, legal articles and monographs in national and international journals. In 1909 he habilitated at the University of Lwów in the field of procedural law, with the work entitled "Deception in courts". He also wrote works in the German language, but mainly published in Polish.

Since 1910 a lecturer at the University of Lwów, Allerhand was appointed an associate professor in 1917, and in 1922 (in the Polish Second Republic) as the regular Professor.

=== In sovereign Poland ===
On August 22, 1919, Allerhand was selected as member of the Polish Sejm Codification Commission; and in 1922, member of the Tribunal of State. In 1929 he became president of the Jewish Community in Lwów. Without engaging himself politically, he believed in cultural assimilation of Polish Jews. He ran a successful law practice. He also worked scientifically; lectured on law enforcement and market competition law, the history and organization of the Polish judiciary as well as legal profession and notarial services, not to mention the aviation insurance law. By 1933 he was head of the Department of Commercial Law and Bills of Exchange. He often invited young lawyers to seminars in his office. Some of the participants later became prominent Poland's lawyers including Karol Koranyi, Kazimierz Przybyłowski, and Ludwik Dworzak. The seminars of prof. Allerhand were attended also by lawyers Jerzy Sawicki i Stefan Rozmaryn-Kwieciński. In 1932–1933, he announced a two-part commentary on the Code of Civil Procedure; and in 1935, Commentary to the Commercial Code. In 1937 he wrote a review of insolvency law.

== World War II ==
After the occupation of Lwów by the Soviet army in 1939 and the reorganization of the university by the NKVD, Allerhand was fired, but after several months allowed to teach at the Law Faculty again. Some time later, after the outbreak of the German–Soviet war of June 30, 1941 and the takeover of Lwów by the Wehrmacht, he refused the position of chairman of the Judenrat (Jewish council). He was forced to move into the Lvov Ghetto along with his family, and therefore escaped the July Massacre of Lviv professors committed by an Einsatzkommando. In August, his son Joachim and daughter-in-law Zina (Zinajda) along with their only child Leszek made a successful escape into the aryan side of the city. On 10 August 1941, Allerhand and his wife Salome (Salomea née Weintraub) were transported from the ghetto to Janowska concentration camp on the outskirts of Lwów.

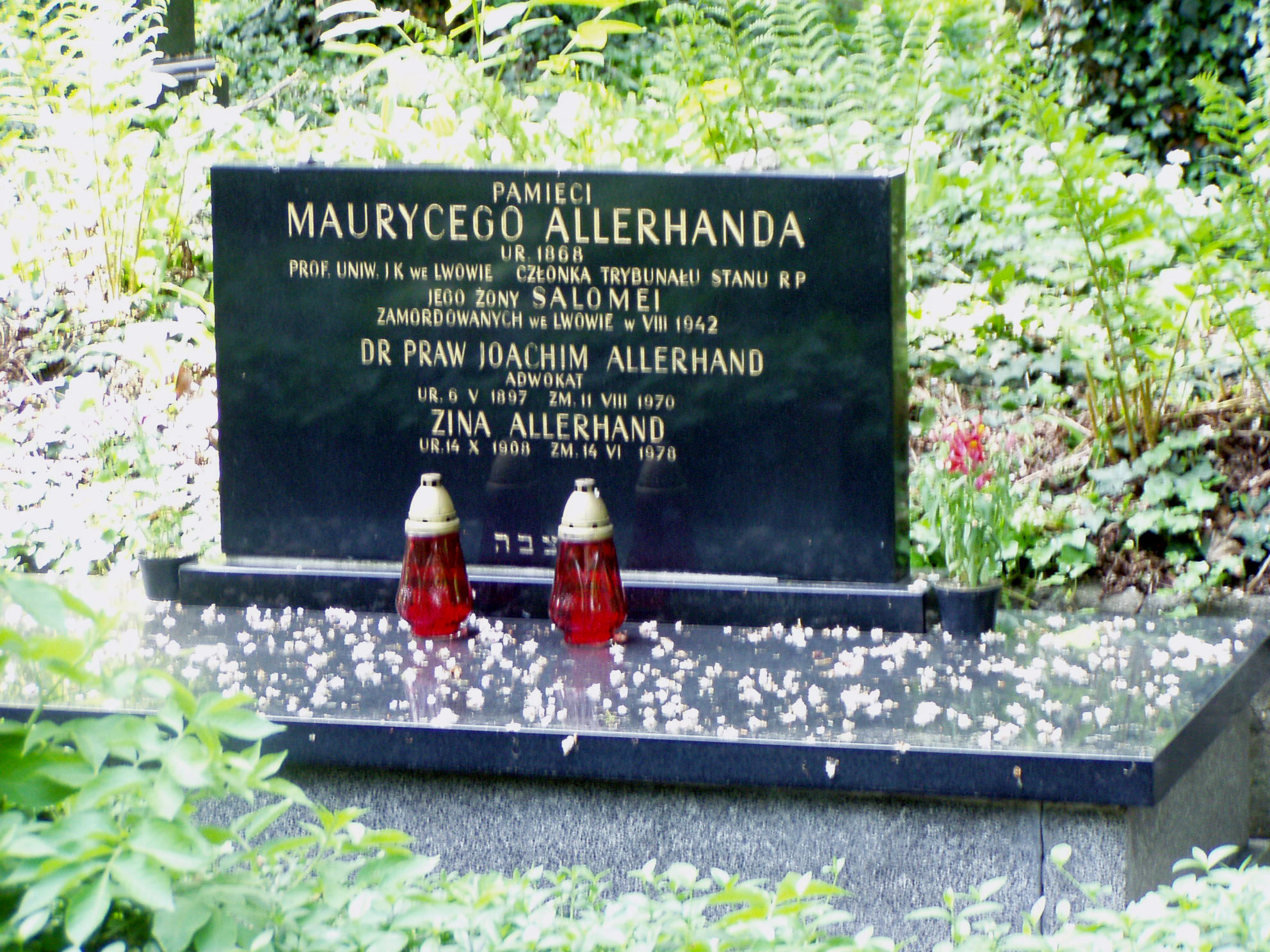
Cenotaph of the Allerhand Family, New Jewish Cemetery, Kraków

Their deaths are not documented, but after the war, Karol Koranyi made a reference to an eyewitness who survived the Camp and saw them being murdered in the same month by the Ukrainische Hilfspolizei. Their bodies were burned and the ashes scattered. Notably, Allerhand family sometimes appears in print incorrectly as victims of Belzec extermination camp. However, his son Joachim with wife Zina and his grandson Leszek who was 10 at the time, had survived the Holocaust. Decades later and only after the collapse of the Soviet empire - known for falsifying the wartime history of the city - his grandson Leszek published a 2003 book based on the memoirs of his grandfather written in 1941–1942, started by Allerhand soon after the German attack of Lwów and concluded in February 1942. His account of life in the ghetto, although not nearly as voluminous as Dobroszycki's Chronicle of the Łódź Ghetto provides invaluable insight into the lives of Polish Jews under the Nazi occupation of Lwów. It describes the 1941 pogroms perpetrated by Germans with the aide of local Ukrainians, but also, it includes a mention of his conversation with a former agitator installed at UoL by the Soviets, blaming the Poles for it. He was promptly corrected by Allerhand.

The book, entitled Zapiski z tamtego świata (Notes from the Other World; or, A Memoir of Other World), is supplemented with the recollections of the young Leszek Allerhand who lived with his grandparents for a long time before their untimely deaths. The original manuscript survived in the Archives of the Jewish Historical Institute in Warsaw (Teka Lwowska), unknown to anybody before the 1962 death of prof. Stefan Stasiak from UoL who kept it safe among his own papers.

The cenotaph of Maurycy Allerhand and his wife, Salome, can be found at the New Jewish Cemetery in Kraków. In 2009, he became patron of the Allerhand Institute law foundation based in Kraków.

== Notes and references ==
- A. Redzik Zapiski z tamtego świata. Książki o Lwowie i Kresach Południowo - Wschodnich, "Rocznik Lwowski", 2004.
- Dr. Leszek Allerhand, The Last Eyewitnesses: Children of the Holocaust Speak, Northwestern University Press, 1998.
- Media related to Maurycy Allerhand at Wikimedia Commons
