= Jacob Adler (writer) =

American poet

Jacob Adler (December 12, 1874 – December 31, 1974), also known by his pen name B. Kovner, was a native of Austria-Hungary and a Galician Jew who became a Yiddish language writer, poet, and humorist in the United States.

== Life ==
Adler was born on December 12, 1874 as Jacob Melech, in Dynów, Galicia (at the time, a governorate of Austria, now part of Poland), the son of Hersh Melech and Zisel Yidler. He emigrated to the United States in 1892 via Ellis Island where he changed his last name to Adler (German for Eagle). He initially settled in New Haven, Connecticut, where he apprenticed as a tailor.

He later moved to New York City and worked in a factory there. He first wrote for The Forward in 1897, when he contributed two short workers' poems under the name Nesher. Over the next several decades, he contributed publications to 54 different magazines and newspapers, including The Forward, Di Varhayt, the Jewish Morning Journal, Fraye Arbeter Shtime, Tsukunft, Yugnt, Literatur un Lebn, Amerike, Yidisher Kemfer, Der Groyser Kundes, Kibetser, Der Beyzem, Fraye Shtunde, Der Arbiter, Fraye Gezelshaft, Dos Naye Lebn, Di Tsayt, Arbeter Fraynd, Yidisher Arbeter (Krakow), Folks-Fraynd (Sanok), Roman-Tsaytung (Warsaw), and Yidishe Velt (Wilno). In 1906, he became editor of the Yiddish weekly Brownsville Progress. He also edited Traumen un Wirklichkeit and Der Yiddisher Gazlen. In 1908, he founded Der Groyser Kundes with Moyshe Nadir.

In 1911, Abraham Cahan invited him to join The Forward and gave him the Litvak pseudonym B. Kovner. He wrote a number of popular humorous characters like Yente Telebende and her husband Mendl, Moyshe Kapoyer, and Peyshe the Farmer, who became household names in Yiddish-speaking American households and inspired a number of songs and stage routines. He wrote a number of poems that were nostalgic for the old country. The poems were collected in his first volume Zikhroynes fun Mayn Haym (Memories of My Home), which was published in 1907 and had an introduction from his mentor David Pinski. Many of his humorous sketches were collected into six Yiddish volumes published between 1914 and 1936. They were also collected in two English volumes, the 1936 Laugh, Jew, Laugh and the 1940 Cheerful Moments. He continued to write into his late 90s

Over the course of his literary career, Adler wrote a dozen books, 18,000 poems, numerous plays, and over 30,000 humorous articles. Many of his works were translated into German, Polish, Hungarian, Hebrew, and English. One of his stories, "Why Doesn't Hellil Move," was translated into Italian by Enrico Caruso in 1919. He continued to write a humor column for The Forward until his retirement in 1936. He then moved to Gulfport, Florida, where he continued to write poems and stories for The Forward. He stopped writing three years before his death, when he entered the nursing home, although he had a backlog of work that continued to be published after he died.

== Personal life and death ==
In 1896, Adler married Celia Schimerling (March 25, 1883 – December 30, 1971). Their children were Bertha, Emil, Simon, Julius, Clara, and Ruth.

Jacob Adler died in Pasadena, Florida on December 31, 1974. He had turned 100 only 19 days earlier. He was buried in Chapel Hill Cemetery in St. Petersburg, Florida. He was survived by four of his six children (Bertha Klausner, Clara Rubin, Emil Adler, and Julius Adler); 14 grandchildren, 26 great-grandchildren, and at least two great-great‐grandchildren.
