= Robert D. Drain =

American judge

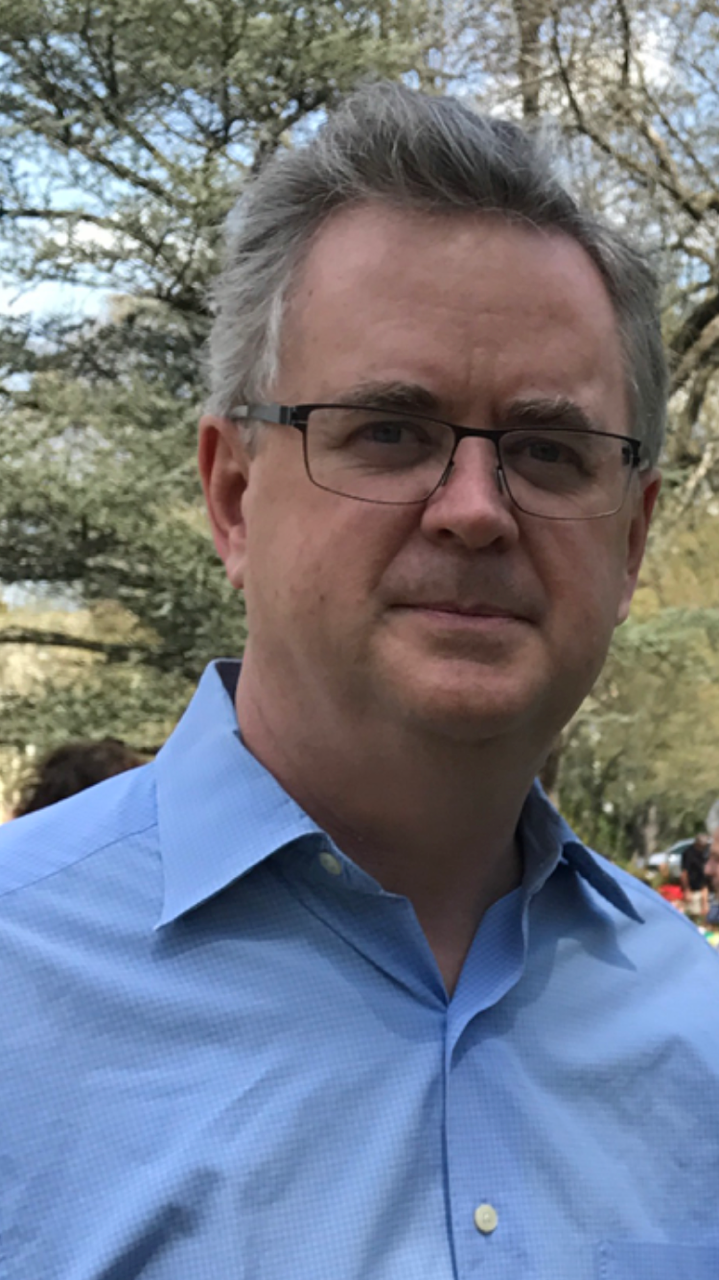
- Judge Robert D. Drain

Bankruptcy judge, United States Bankruptcy Court for the Southern District of New York
- In office 2002–2022

Personal details
- Born: c. 1957 United States
- Education: B.A., Yale University (1979), J.D., Columbia University School of Law (1984)
- Alma mater: Yale University, Columbia University School of Law
- Occupation: United States bankruptcy judge, partner at Paul, Weiss, Rifkind, Wharton & Garrison, adjunct professor
- Profession: Bankruptcy judge, attorney
- Known for: Presiding over high-profile corporate bankruptcies

Robert D. Drain (born c. 1957) is a former United States bankruptcy judge of the United States Bankruptcy Court for the Southern District of New York who has presided at several high-profile corporate bankruptcies.

== Early life ==
Drain received a B.A. degree cum laude with honors in 1979 from Yale University and J.D. in 1984 from Columbia University School of Law where he was a Harlan Fiske Stone Scholar for three years.

He was a partner in the bankruptcy department of the New York firm Paul, Weiss, Rifkind, Wharton & Garrison when he was appointed to be judge in 2002. He was also an adjunct professor of law at St. John's University School of Law's LLM in Bankruptcy Program for several years and is an adjunct professor at the Pace University School of Law. He retired from the court in June 2022 and joined the Corporate Restructuring Group at the law firm Skadden, Arps, Slate, Meagher & Flom.

== Notable cases ==
He has presided over the bankruptcies of:

- A&P
- Cenveo
- Christian Brothers
- Coudert Brothers
- Delphi Automotive
- Frontier Airlines
- Frontier Communications
- Hostess Brands
- Loral
- OneWeb
- Purdue Pharma, emerging into Harrington v. Purdue
- RCN
- Reader's Digest
- Refco
- Roust
- Sears Holdings Corporation
- Star Tribune
- Sungard
- Tops
- Windstream Holdings

In addition, he has presided over the ancillary or plenary cases involving foreign companies with United States connections, including Parmalat, Varig S.A., and Yukos.
