= National Envelope Corporation =

American manufacturer of envelopes

National Envelope Corporation was an American manufacturer of envelopes.

National Envelope was founded in 1952 in New York, New York, as the New York Envelope Company by William Ungar, who served as its chairman, president and chief executive officer. Founded with 3 machines and 5 employees, Ungar grew the business through acquisitions, the purchase of assets from bankrupt or troubled companies, and organic growth. In 2001, they had seventeen manufacturing facilities in nine states.

In June 2010, NEC filed for voluntary bankruptcy under Chapter 11, Title 11, United States Code and later in 2010, it was acquired by the private equity firm Gores Group In June 2013, National Envelope (then renamed NE Opco Inc) filed for bankruptcy a second time. In September 2013, the operating assets of National Envelope were sold to the printing company Cenveo for $25 million while Hilco Receivables LLC purchased its existing accounts receivable for $25 million and Southern Paper LLC purchased its inventory for $15 million. The National Envelope brand was retired.

== History ==
- 1952 – New York Envelope founded (New York, New York)
- 1970 – National Envelope North founded (Worcester, Massachusetts)
- 1975 – National Envelope South founded (Austell, Georgia)
- 1980 – National Envelope Midwest founded (Lenexa, Kansas)
- 1981 – Champion Envelope acquired (Union Township, New Jersey)
- 1981 – National Envelope Central founded (Earth City, Missouri)
- 1990 – Champion Envelope West founded (California)
- 1990 – Aristocrat Envelope (New York)
- 1994 – Old Colony Envelope acquired (Westfield, Massachusetts)
- 1995 – National Envelope Northwest founded (Washington)
- 1998 – Colortree acquired (Texas)
- 2000 – Williamhouse Corporation acquired (Corsicana, Texas)
- 2001 – Alcor Envelope acquired (New York)
- 2010 – Acquired by the Gores Group out of bankruptcy for $150 million
- 2011 – The Gores Group won the Global M&A Network's Atlas Award for "turnaround deal of the year" for their acquisition of National Envelope.
- 2013 – Filed for bankruptcy for the second time
- 2013 – National Envelope assets are liquidated for $65 million: Operating assets sold to Cenveo; accounts receivable sold to Hilco Receivables LLC; and inventory sold to Southern Paper LLC.
- 2013 – National Envelope name retired
