= Cenveo =

Company based in Stamford, Connecticut, US

Cenveo, Inc
- Company type: Public company
- Traded as: Nasdaq: CVO
- Industry: Diversified printing
- Area served: U.S., Canada, India, Asia, Caribbean Rim
- Key people: Robert Burton, Jr. (CEO)
- Products: Commercial printing, envelopes, label manufacturing, packaging and publisher services
- Revenue: ▼$1.66 billion (2016)
- Operating income: ▲$0.158 billion (2016)
- Net income: ▲$0.068 billion (2016)
- Total assets: ▼$0.913 billion (2016)
- Total equity: ▲$-0.590 billion (2016)
- Number of employees: ▼7,300 (2016)
- Subsidiaries: Lightning Labels, Dealer, Discount Labels, Lancer Label, Synergy, Rx Technology, Nashua (labels); Gilbreth, Rex (packaging); Quality Park, National Footprint (envelopes); Cadmus (journal, book and magazine printing); Cenveo Creative Services (creative); Nashua (point of sale services)
- Website: cenveo.com

Cenveo is a company based in Stamford, Connecticut, United States. It is engaged in the manufacture of various print-related products. Founded in 1921 as Denver-based Rockmont Envelope, the company's products and services include printed labels, packaging and digital print products, print magazine and books, mailing and creative services, and inventory and warehouse management software. In January 2018 Cenveo filed for Chapter 11 bankruptcy citing overwhelming debt to multiple lenders.

== History ==
Before changing its name to Cenveo, the company was known as Mail-Well, which was derived from Denver's Rockmont Envelope. After changing ownership several times and acquiring and divesting various label and packing operations, the company changed its name to Cenveo in 2004. Cenveo spent the next few years streamlining its product and service offerings, adding Cadmus Communications to its company lineup in 2007, which made Cenveo one of the "largest printing companies in North America." In 2017, Cenveo was awarded a two-year $61 million contract to produce letters, envelopes, and questionnaires for the 2020 U.S. census, though the contract was terminated after Cenveo declared bankruptcy. In 2018, Robert Burton Sr. stepped down as CEO of Cenveo and his son, Robert Burton Jr. was announced as the new CEO.

== Acquisitions and partnerships ==
Under its new name and corporate identity, Cenveo first attempted to purchase Banta Corporation, a Wisconsin-based printing and supply chain management company, in August 2006. The $1.21 billion offer was turned down by Banta's then-chairperson and CEO Stephanie Streeter, who then sold the company months later to RR Donnelley for $1.3 billion.

After Cenveo successfully purchased Cadmus Communications in 2007, which gave Cenveo a stronger hold on the scientific and technical journal-printing market, it sought to add other companies to its expanding operations. Cenveo acquired Commercial Envelope and PC Ink, otherwise known as Printegra, also in 2007, which extended product and service offerings to the printed envelope, label and business form industry.

Cenveo focused next on purchasing companies to expand its commercial offerings, buying California-based Madison/Graham ColorGraphics and Rex Corp. in 2007 and 2008, respectively.

The company did not add another company to its growing list of acquisitions until 2009 when it purchased Nashua Corporation, which increased Cenveo's offerings in the specialty paper and pharmaceutical label industry.

Cenveo also made acquisitions in the publisher services segment by acquiring Glyph International (2010) and Nesbitt Graphics (2011), both full service book production companies.

In 2012, Cenveo sold its Forms and Business Documents Group to Ennis. In September 2013, Cenveo purchased the operating assets of its bankrupt competitor, National Envelope Corporation, for $25 million.

By the end of 2015, the Burton family will have received over $70 million in compensation from their Cenveo employment.

== Board of directors ==
- Robert G. Burton, Jr. (2018-present) –CEO, President(2005-2018), Cenveo; former President of Corporate Operations, Cenveo; former VP of Investor Relations, Treasury, HR and Legal, Cenveo; former President, Burton Capital Management, LLC.
- Robert G. Burton, Sr. (2005 to 2018) – Chairman and CEO, Cenveo; Founder, Chairman and CEO, Burton Capital Management, LLC; former CEO, Moore Corporation Limited and World Color Press.
- Scott Goodwin (2012 to present) – CFO, Cenveo; former Assistant Controller, Senior VP of Finance, Corporate Controller and Chief Accounting Officer, Cenveo.
- Mark S. Hiltwein (2007 to present) – President of the Envelope Group, Cenveo; former DFO and President of Field Sales and Manufacturing, Cenveo; former President of Smartshipper.com and Executive VP and CFO of Moore Wallace Incorporated.
- Ian Scheinmann (2010 to present) – Vice President of Legal Affairs, Cenveo; former Cenveo real estate counsel for Rudoler & DeRosa, LLC.
- Harry Vinson (2007 to present) – President of Cenveo Print, Cenveo; former Senior Vice President of Purchasing and Logistics, Cenveo; former Senior Vice President of the Publication and Directory Group, Moore Wallace Incorporated.
- Gerald Armstrong – Independent Director, Cenveo; current managing director, Arena Capital Partners, LLC.
- Leonard Green – Independent Director, Cenveo; current managing partner, The Green Group financial services.
- Mark Griffin – Independent Director, Cenveo; founder, Eagle Hill School in Greenwich, Connecticut.
- Robert Obernier – independent Director, Cenveo; founder, President and CEO, Horizon Paper Company; board member and former Chairman of the Norwalk Hospital Foundation.
