= Kamianske, Zakarpattia Oblast =

Kamianske Кам'янське
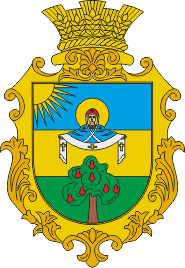
- Coat of arms
- Interactive map of Kamianske
- Location of Kamyanske Kamianske (Ukraine)
- Coordinates: 48°16′00″N 22°57′00″E
- Country: Ukraine
- Oblast: Zakarpattia Oblast
- Raions: Berehove Raion
- Established: 1412
- Elevation: 135 m (443 ft)

Population
  - Total: 1,482 (2,021 census)

Kamianske is a locality in western Ukraine. It is in the Berehove Raion of the Zakarpattia Oblast, but formerly administered as part of Irshava Raion. Kamyanske is also known as Кам'янське/Kam'yans'ke (Ukrainian), Beregkövesd (Hungarian), Kivjažď (Slovakian), Каменское/Kamenskoye (Russian), Kamenka, Kivyazhd, Kamjanske, and Szilicekövesd.

It was formerly part of Czechoslovakia until 1945.
