= Tzvi Elimelech Spira of Dinov =

Hasidic Rebbe in Poland

- Title: Bnei Yissachar

Personal life
- Born: 1783 Jawornik Polski, Poland
- Died: 11 January 1841 (aged 57–58) Dynów, Poland
- Buried: Dynów, Poland
- Parent(s): Pesach Langsam; Ita (or Rochel Mina)
- Dynasty: Dinov

Religious life
- Religion: Judaism

Jewish leader
- Successor: David Spira
- Main work: Bnei Yissachar
- Yahrtzeit: 18 Tevet
- Dynasty: Dinov

Tzvi Elimelech Spira of Dinov (Hebrew: צבי אלימלך שפירא מדינוב; 1783 – 11 January 1841) was a leading Hasidic Rebbe in Poland, founder of the Dinov Dynasty. He was a prolific writer, best known as the author of Bnei Yissachar, by which title he is also called. He is also referred to by the Hebrew acronym מהרצ"א.

== Biography ==
Tzvi Elimelech was a nephew of Elimelech of Lizhensk and a student of Menachem Mendel of Rimanov, Yaakov Yitzchak of Lublin and Yisroel Hopstein. According to a tradition, he was informed by Yaakov Yitzchak, that he was a descendant of the tribe of Issachar.

He became rabbi of several cities of Poland, chiefly Dynów. He was known as a stubborn opponent of the Haskalah movement. The traditions of Zvi Elimelech Spira continue among his descendants and followers in Brooklyn. His grave in Poland became a place of pilgrimage for the Hasidim.

Of interest is that the Bnei Yissaschar had the practice of wearing tefillin (phylacteries) made from dakos, i.e. "refined", leather, whereas these are generally manufactured with gasos, robust, leather. His tefillin therefore wore out regularly, and the Bnei Yissaschar had several throughout his lifetime; see image.

== Works ==
Rabbi Spira's best known work is the Bnei Yissaschar (בני יששכר; 'Tribe of Issachar'). It is described as "one of the most important and oft-quoted of the classic chassidic texts". It discusses mystical aspects of the Sabbath and festivals and is arranged according to the months of the year. The title of the work is based on the verse "Of the Issacharites, men who knew how to interpret the signs of the times" (I Chronicles 12:33), an allusion to the book's explanation of the Jewish festivals.

Rabbi Spira authored numerous other works also, spanning various topics. These include books on Chassidut and mussar, the Halachik aspects of the festivals, and separate commentaries on Mishna, on various Talmudic tractates, and on Torah and several books of the Tanach.

== Gallery ==
Tzvi Elimelech Spira
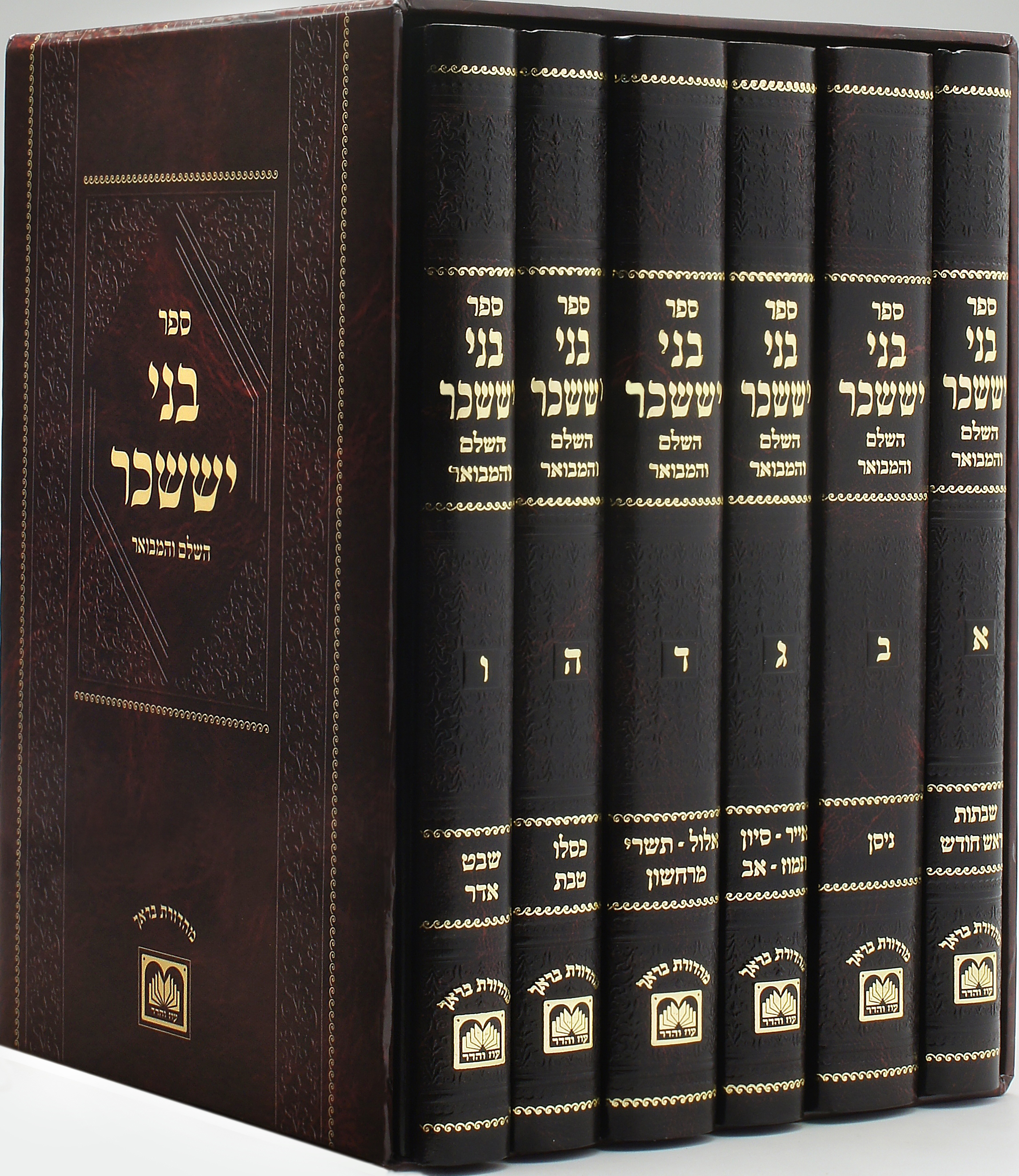
Contemporary print of Bnei Yissaschar

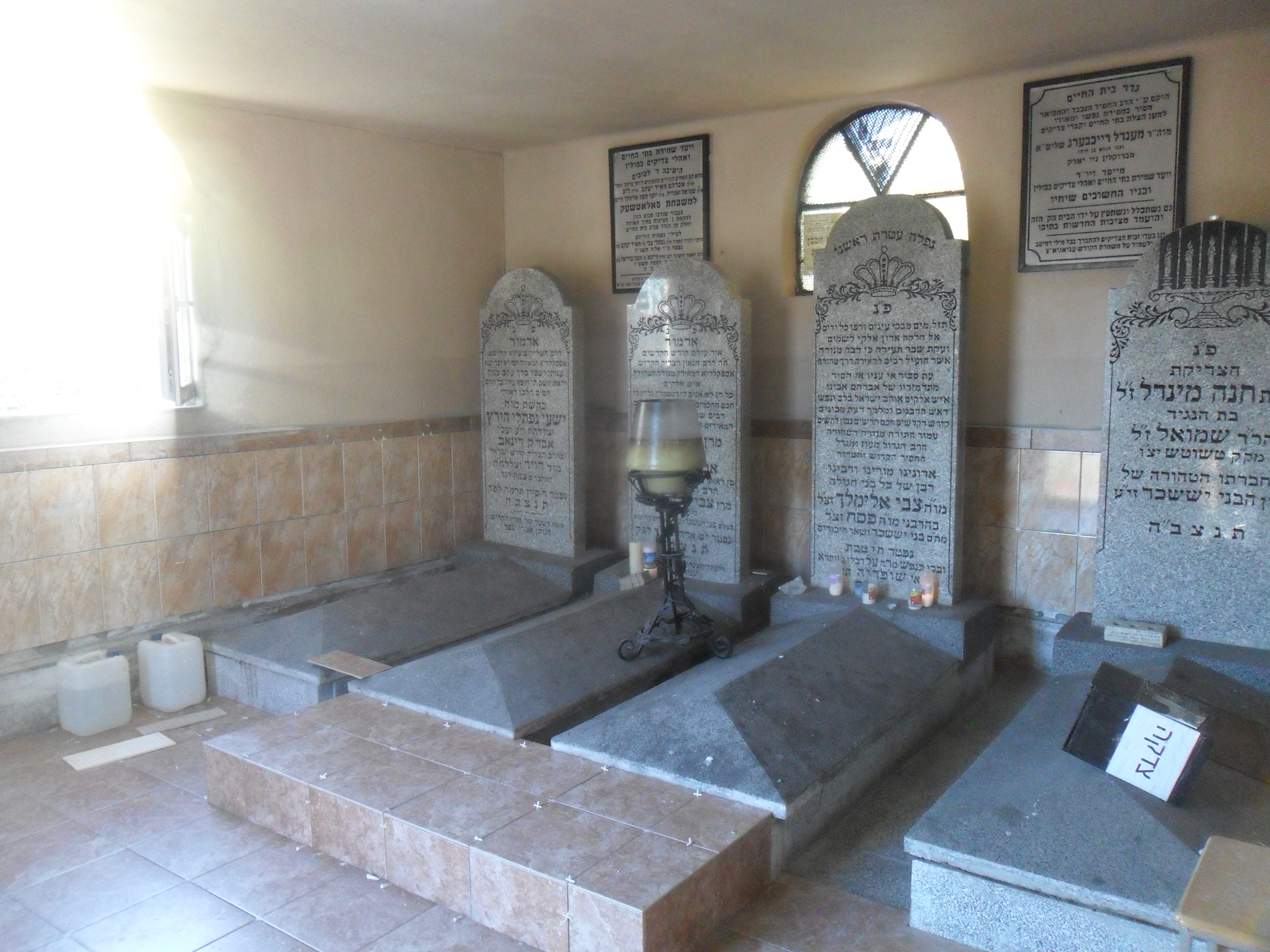
Rabbi Spira's tomb in Dynów

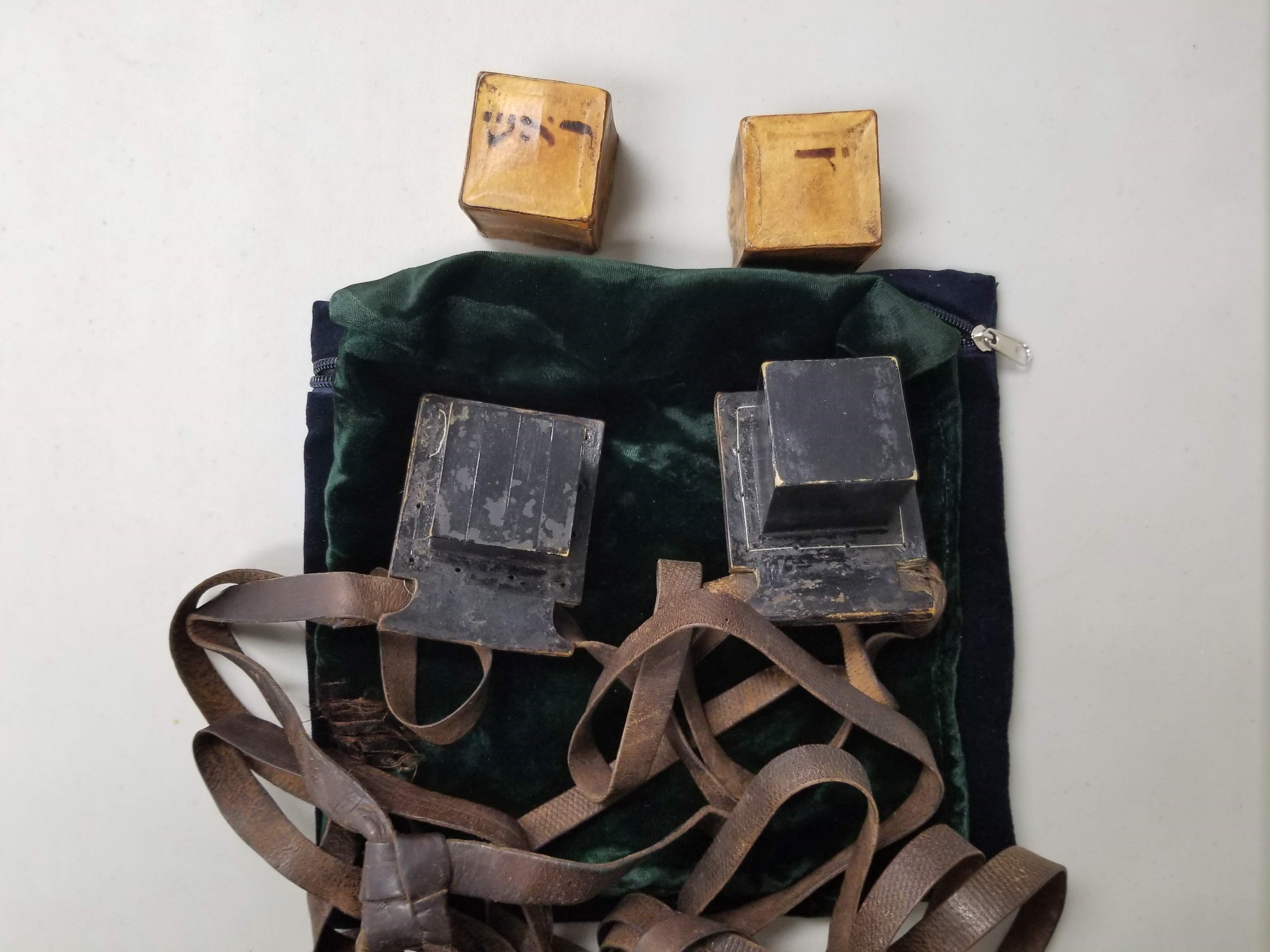
A preserved pair of tefillin worn by the Bnei Yissaschar
