= Rybotycze =

- Village
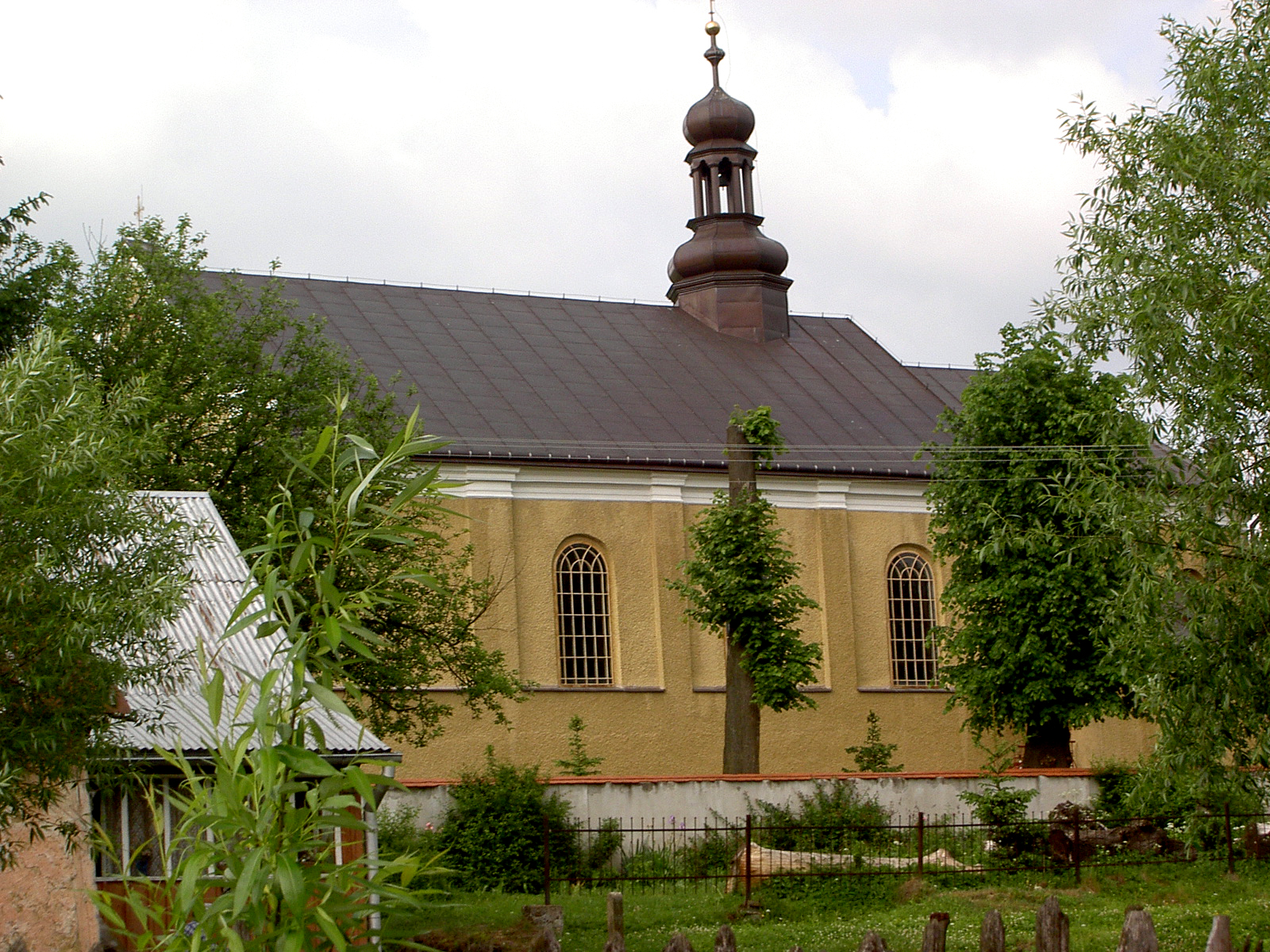
- Parish church

- Location within Poland
- Coordinates: 49°39′N 22°39′E
- Country: Poland
- Voivodeship: Subcarpathian
- County: Przemyśl
- Gmina: Fredropol
- Population: 440

Rybotycze [rɨbɔˈtɨt͡ʂɛ] is a village in the administrative district of Gmina Fredropol, within Przemyśl County, Subcarpathian Voivodeship, in south-eastern Poland, close to the border with Ukraine.
