= Dynów =

Town in Podkarpackie Voivodeship, Poland

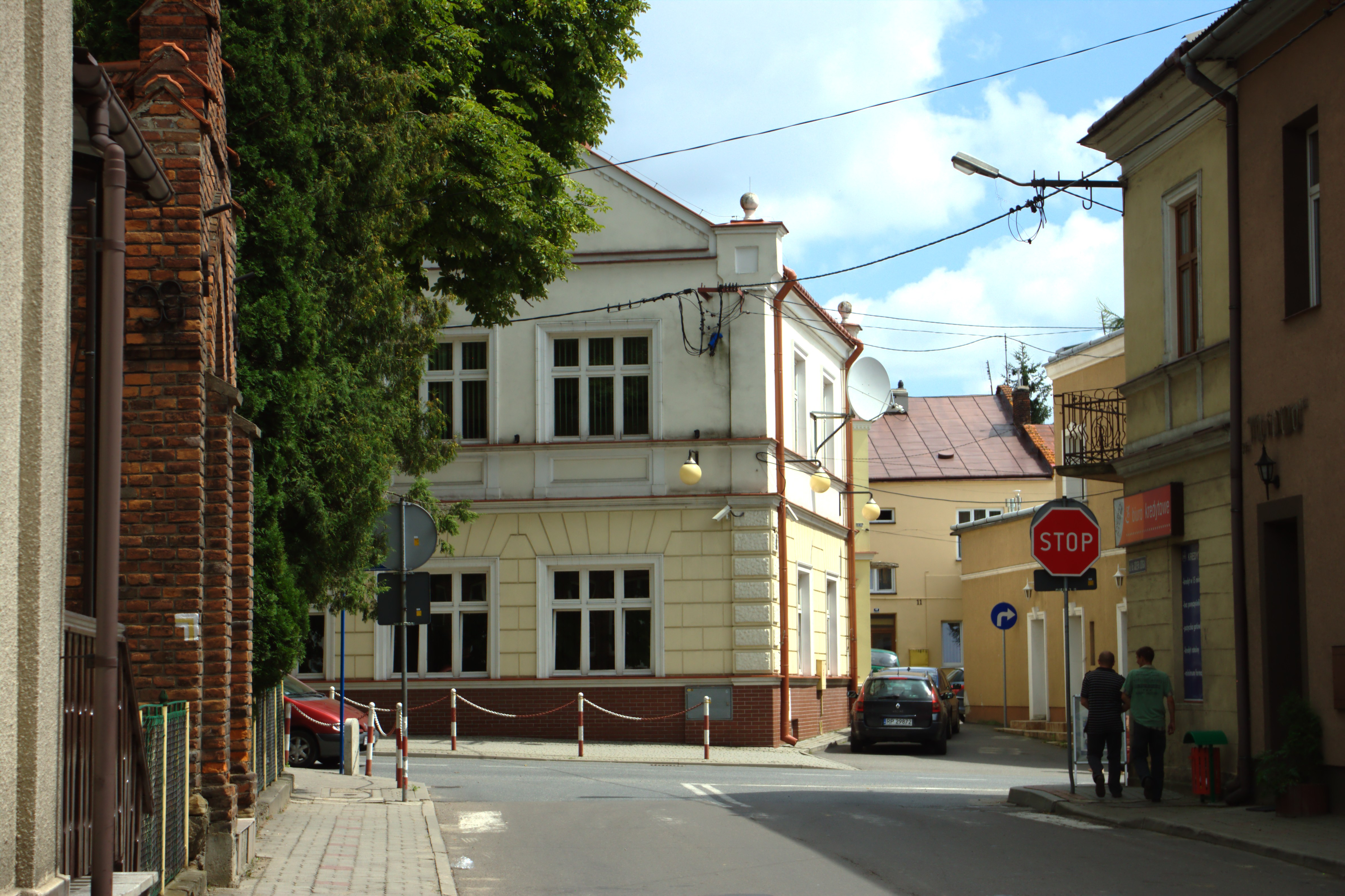
- A crossroad in the very center of the town of Dynów

- Coat of arms

- Location within Poland
- Coordinates: 49°50′N 22°14′E
- Country: Poland
- Voivodeship: Subcarpathian
- County: Rzeszów
- Gmina: Dynów (urban gmina)

Government
  - Mayor: Zygmunt Frańczak

Area
  - Total: 24.41 km^{2} (9.42 sq mi)

Population (2006)
  - Total: 6,076
  - Density: 248.9/km^{2} (644.7/sq mi)
- Time zone: UTC+1 (CET)
  - Summer (DST): UTC+2 (CEST)
- Postal code: 36-065
- Car plates: RZE
- Website: http://www.dynow.pl

Dynów ([ˈdɨnuf]) (Note: Ukrainian: Динів, Latin: Dinoum, Yiddish: דינאוו) is a town in Rzeszów County, Subcarpathian Voivodeship, Poland, with a population of 6,058 (02.06.2009).

== History ==
Dynów was first mentioned in written sources in 1423. At that time, together with other villages, it belonged to the noble Kmita family from Lesser Poland. In 1409, after the death of Voivode of Kraków, Piotr Kmita, the village was handed to his son, Piotr Lunak, who died in 1430. Dynów was granted town charter probably before 1429. In 1448, it became seat of a Roman Catholic parish, but remained a small town, located in the Ruthenian Voivodeship in the Lesser Poland Province of the Kingdom of Poland.

In March 1657, Dynów was captured by Transilvanian army of George II Rakoczi, which burned the town, together with its churches and castle. In 1661, Dynów was plundered again, this time by mercenaries of Mikolaj Ossolinski, who fought his private war with owner of Dynow, Olbracht Grochowski. In 1667, the town was purchased by Castellan of Przemyśl, Marcin Konstanty Krasicki.

Following the First Partition of Poland (1772) Dynów was annexed by the Habsburg Empire, and remained in Austrian Galicia until 1918. In the second half of the 19th century, a brewery and a small oil refinery were opened here. Most of Dynów's residents were artisans, including masons, carpenters and weavers. In 1904, a narrow gauge rail line to Przeworsk was completed.

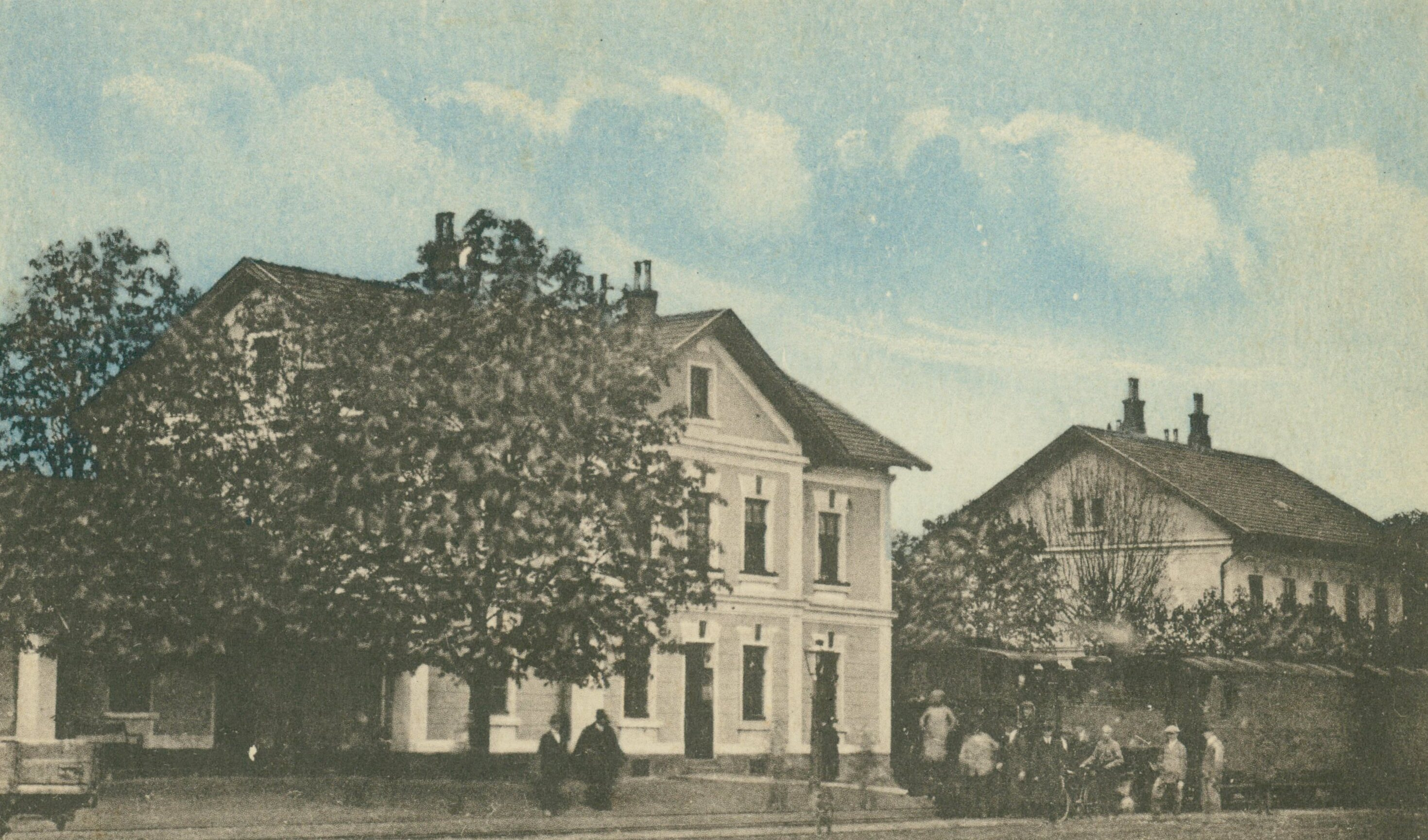
Railway station in the 1920s

In 1785, the town had 2,203 inhabitants. Among them 67,5% were Polish, 26,8% Jewish and 5,4% Ukrainian. According to the 1921 census, the town had a population of 2,727, of which 66.1% declared Polish nationality, 32.6% declared Jewish nationality, and 1.3% declared Ukrainian nationality.

After World War I, Dynów returned to newly restored Poland, and until 1939, belonged to Lwów Voivodeship. In 1919, it lost its town charter. During the German invasion of Poland, which started World War II, on September 13, 1939, the Dynów was captured by German 5th Infantry Division. The Polish resistance was quickly organized in Dynów, and already on 29 November 1939, it launched an attack on a German police station. Dynów was an important center of the Home Army.

During the German Invasion of Poland in 1939, Wehrmacht soldiers on the first day of Jewish New Year (Rosh Hashanah) mass murdered 200 Jewish civilians from the town. 150 Jews were mass murdered by machine guns after being taken away from the town on trucks. 50 Jews were burned alive in their prayer house.

In 1946, Dynów regained its town charter.

== People from Dynów ==
- Jacob Adler (1874–1974), American Yiddish writer born in Dynów.
- Yaroslav Halan (1902–1949), Ukrainian playwright and publicist.
- Tzvi Elimelech Spira of Dinov (1783–1841) "Rebbe", author of the Bnei Yissachar

== Gallery ==
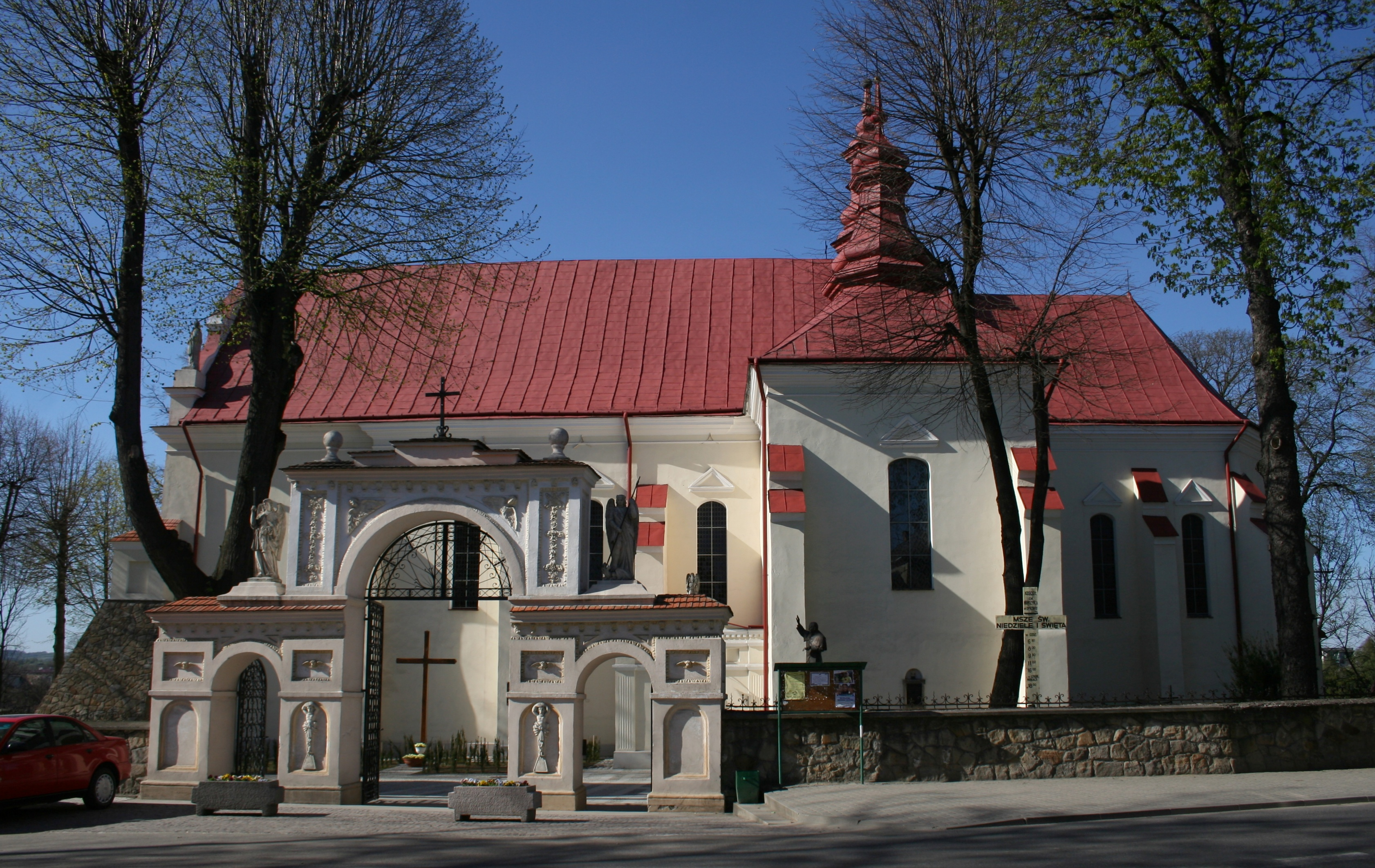
St. Lawrence Church

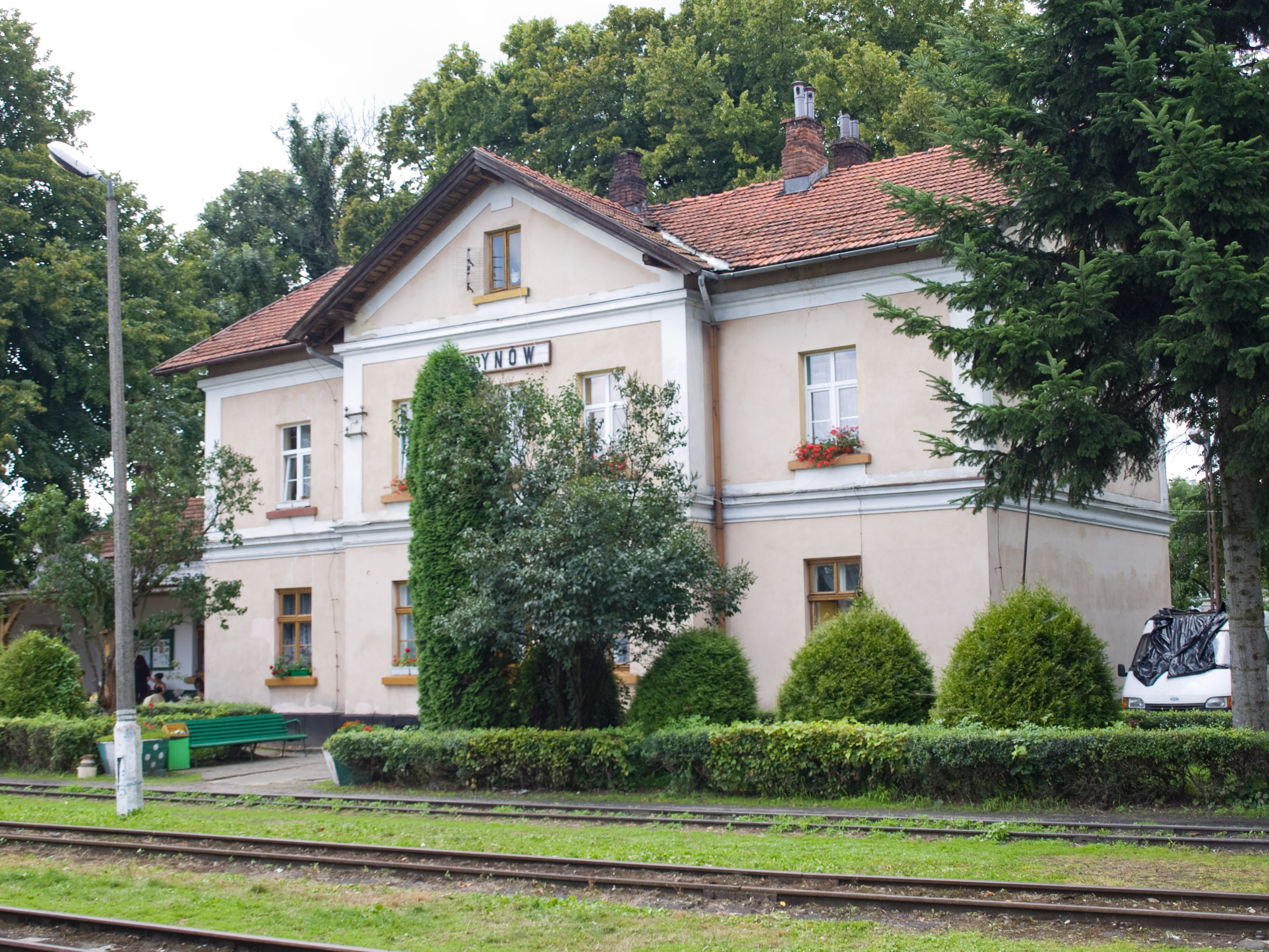
Narrow-gauge railway station

King Władysław Jagiełło Monument

Cooperative Bank

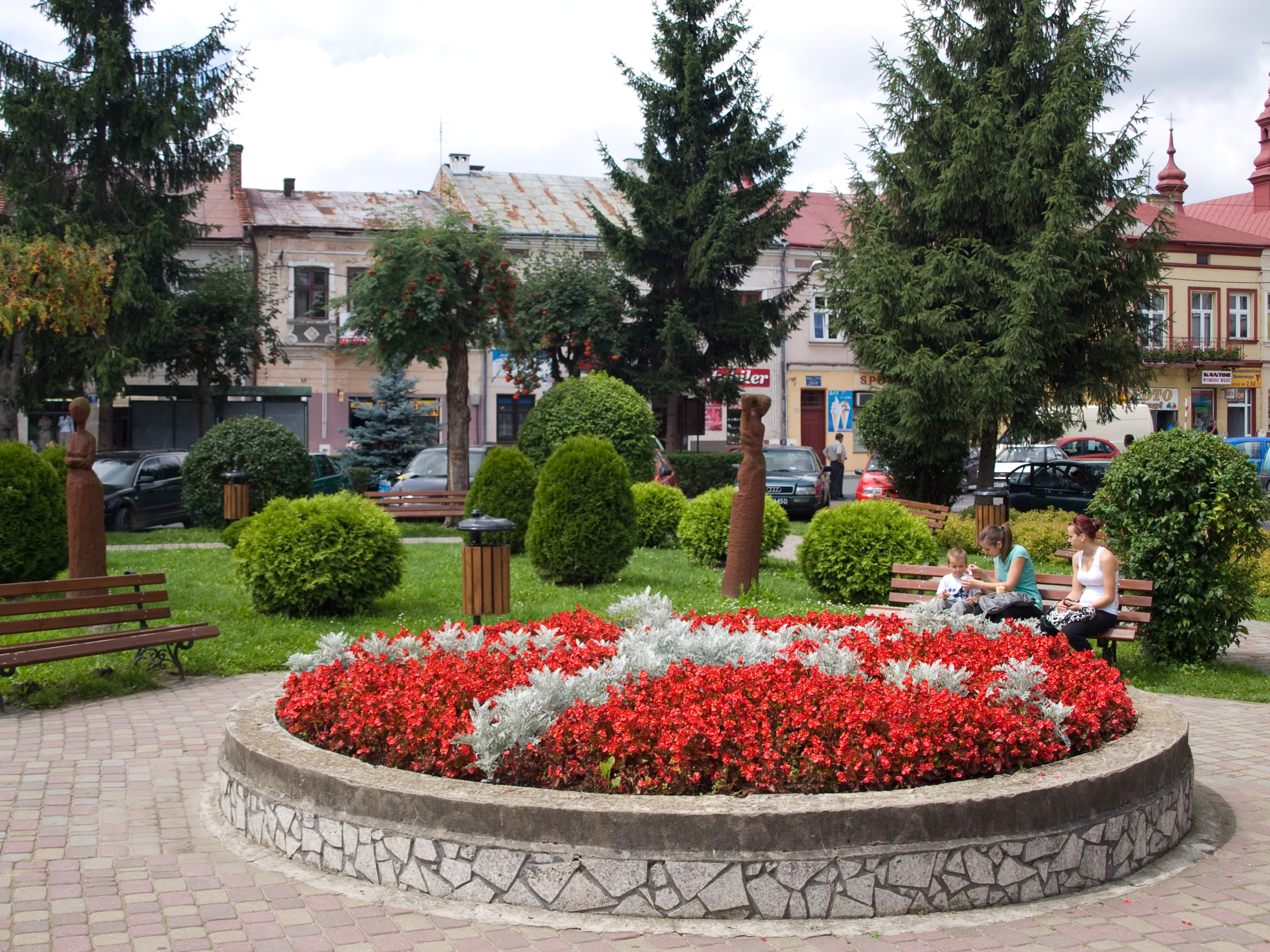
Market square

Rural gmina office
