= Błażowa =

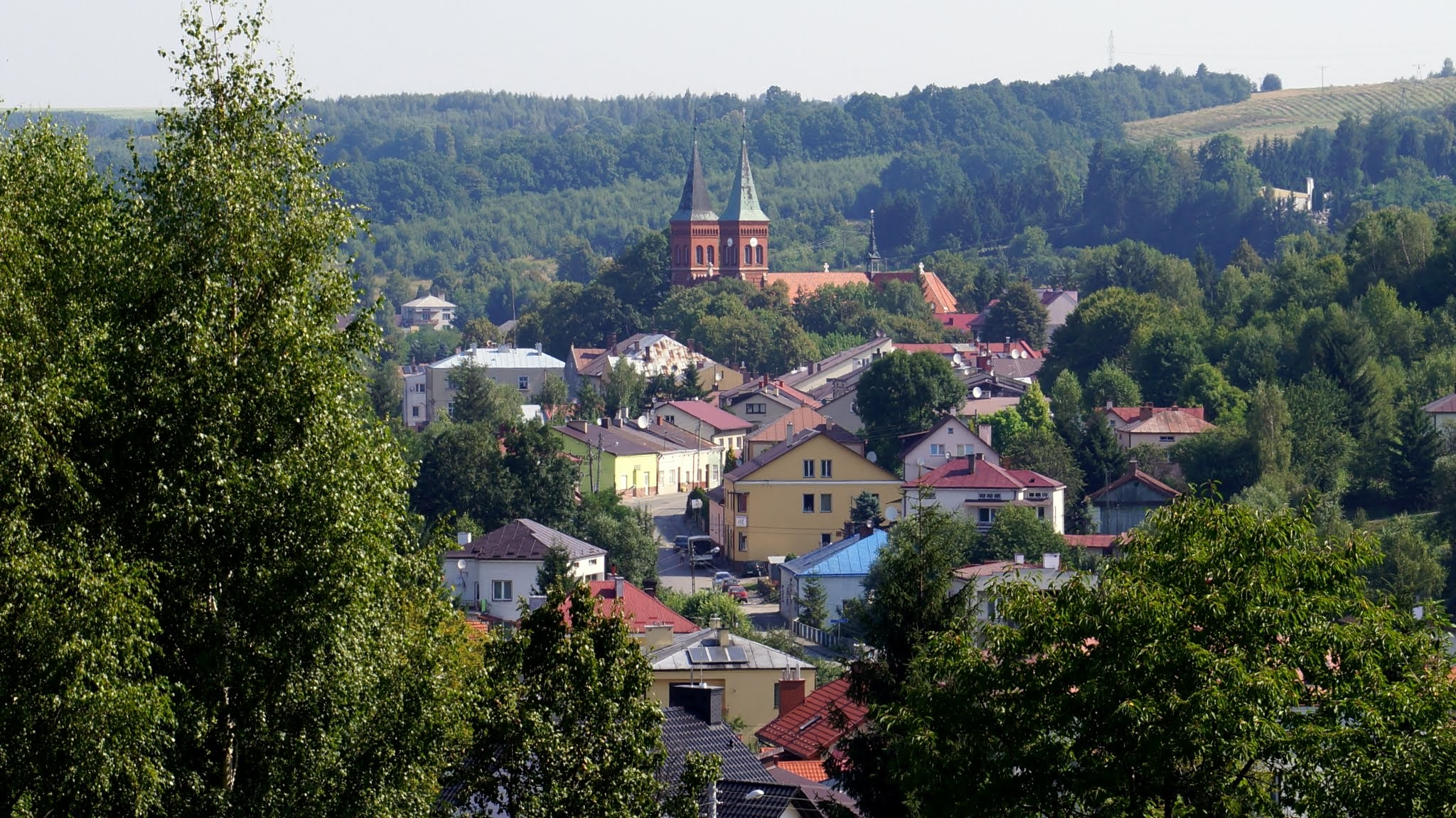

- Coat of arms

- Location within Poland
- Coordinates: 49°54′N 22°6′E
- Country: Poland
- Voivodeship: Subcarpathian
- County: Rzeszów
- Gmina: Błażowa
- First mentioned: 1429
- Town rights: 1770

Government
  - Mayor: Jerzy Kocój

Area
  - Total: 4.23 km^{2} (1.63 sq mi)

Population (31 December 2021)
  - Total: 2,149
  - Density: 508/km^{2} (1,320/sq mi)
- Time zone: UTC+1 (CET)
  - Summer (DST): UTC+2 (CEST)
- Postal code: 36-030
- Area code: +48 17
- Car plates: RZE
- Website: http://blazowa.com.pl/

Błażowa [bwaˈʐɔva] (Yiddish: בלאזשאוו Blazhov) is a town in Rzeszów County, Subcarpathian Voivodeship, Poland, seat of Gmina Błażowa, with a population of 2,149 as of December 2021.

== History ==
The area was included in the emerging Polish state by its first historic ruler Mieszko I in the 10th century. In 981 it was annexed from Poland by the Kievan Rus', and afterwards, in the High Middle Ages, it changed owners several times between Poland and the Rus', and even fell to the Mongol Empire in the mid-13th century, before it was reintegrated with Poland by King Casimir III the Great in 1340.

Błażowa remained a village located in Sanok Land. The local Catholic parish was established in 1432. In 1624 the whole area was raided by the Crimean Tatars and another devastating Tatar raid took place in 1672. In 1655–56, during the Swedish invasion of Poland, Błażowa was burned down by Swedish and then Transylvanian-Cossack soldiers. Further destruction was brought by the Great Northern War. It is not known when exactly Błażowa received town charter, probably some time between 1770 and 1776.

In 1772, after the First Partition of Poland, the whole Sanok Land was annexed by the Habsburg Empire, and became part of Austrian Galicia in which it remained until late 1918. The Bluzhev Hasidic dynasty was founded in Błażowa in the 1880s. In the late 19th century, residents mainly made a living from farming, weaving and cloth making, and there was also a brewery, distillery and water-powered sawmill.

In May 1907 a fire broke out in the village which over many hours destroyed its wooden buildings. After this disaster the village was rebuilt in a more modern style, new space was recovered in the centre and a new school built. A neo-Gothic church in honour of St Nicholas Martin was built and two new synagogues. In 1909, Błażowa received regular bus connection with Rzeszów, and in 1910, a monument of King Władysław Jagiełło was unveiled, on the 400th anniversary of the Battle of Grunwald.

In the Second Polish Republic (1918–1939), Błażowa belonged to the Lwów Voivodeship. According to the 1921 census, it had a population of 5,123, 83.8% Polish and 16.2% Jewish. It was one of centers of the 1937 peasant strike in Poland.

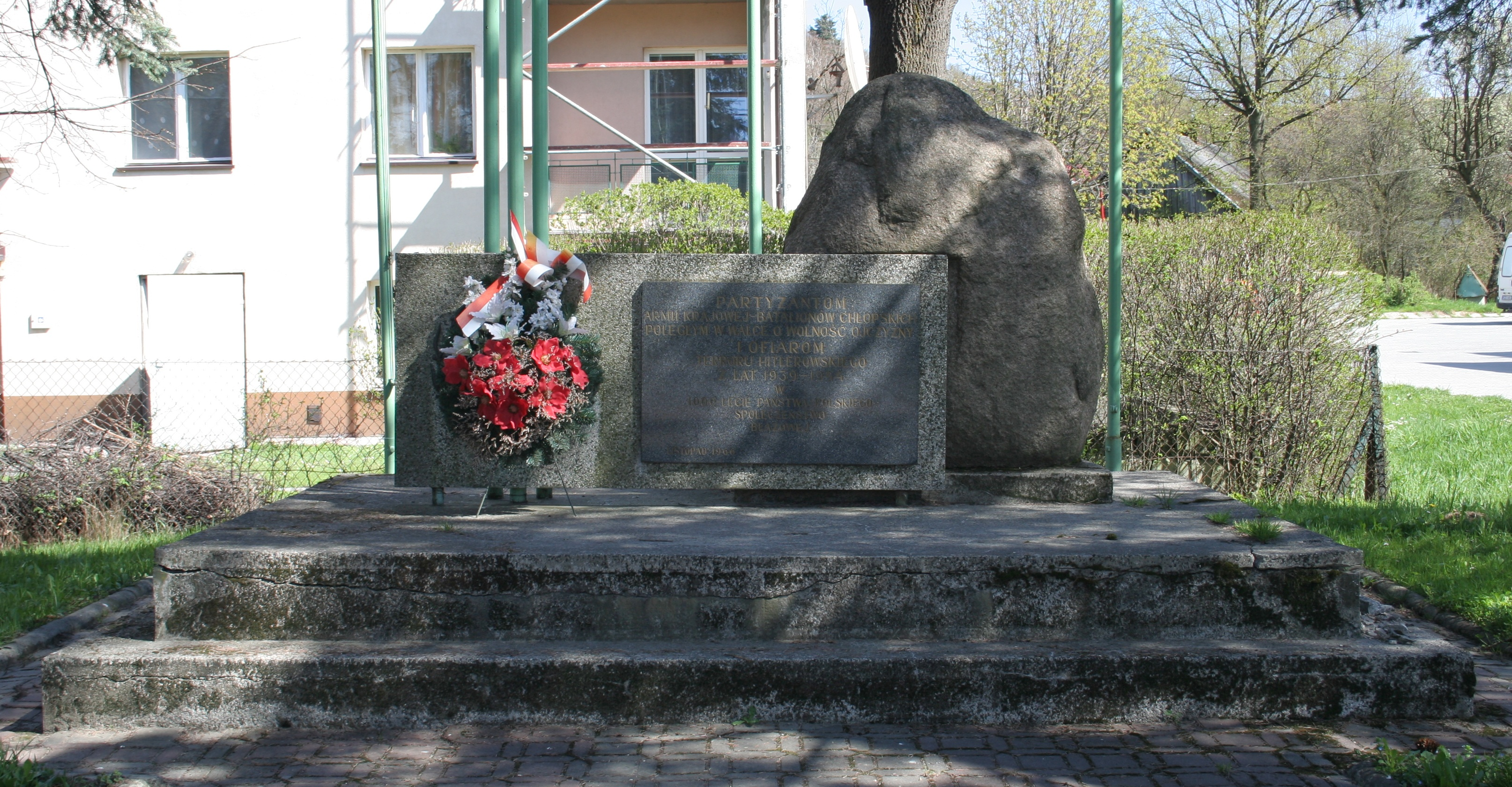
Memorial to Polish partisans and victims of German occupation during World War II

During World War II the village was occupied by Germany from 1939 to 1944. The Home Army was active in the area of Błażowa. On 26 June 1941 the Jews of Błażowa, numbering about 930, were forcibly moved to a ghetto in Rzeszów. They joined Jews from nearby villages and shared their fate. Some were shot on the streets of Rzeszów, others deported to forced labour camps or shot in Głogów Forest or transported Belzec extermination camp (between 7 and 18 July 1942) where they were gassed on arrival.
