= Biala (Hasidic dynasty) =

Polish Hasidic dynasty

Biala Hasidic Dynasty
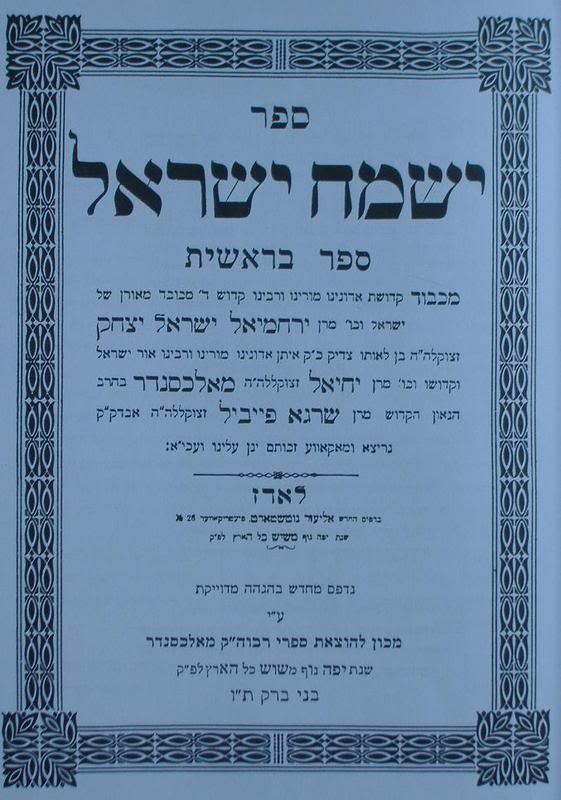
- The title page to Sefer Yismach Yisroel

Founder
- Rabbi Yaakov Yitzchak of Peshischa

Regions with significant populations
- Israel, United States, Switzerland

Religions
- Hasidic Judaism

Languages
- Yiddish, Hebrew

Related ethnic groups
- Peshischa, Munkacs, Satmar

Biala (Yiddish: ביאלע) is a Hasidic dynasty originating from the city of Biała Podlaska, where it was founded by R. Yaakov Yitzchak Rabinowicz (II) (1847 - 1905). Biala is a branch of Peshischa Hasidism, as R. Yaakov Yitzchak Rabinowicz (II) was the great-grandson of R. Yaakov Yitzchak Rabinowicz ("the Yid HaKadosh") (1766 - 1813), the first Peshischa Rebbe. The dynasty was originally spread throughout many towns in Poland, often taking the names of said towns. However, after the Holocaust, the name "Biala" become synonymous with the entire dynasty. Today the dynasty is mostly concentrated in Israel, America and Switzerland.

== Lineage ==
- Grand Rabbi Yaakov Yitzchak Rabinowicz of Peshischa (1766 - 1813) - Known as the "Yid HaKadosh", he was a disciple of R. Yaakov Yitzchak Horowitz of Lublin (1745 - 1815), whom he later separated from following a notable theological difference between the two men. The Yid HaKadosh established the Peshischa school of Hasidic thought based out of Przysucha, Poland. He preached a rationalistic and talmudic-centric approach to Hasidism which stood in contrast to the kabbalistic and miracle based court of Lublin. After his death, he was succeeded by his disciple, R. Simcha Bunem Bonhardt (1765 - 1827), who went on to become one of the foremost figures in Polish Hasidism.
  - Grand Rabbi Yerachmiel (Tzvi) Rabinowicz (1784 - 1834) - Son of the Yid HaKadosh, he supported himself as a watch maker and is best known for defending R. Simcha Bunem, after an attempted was made by several Hasidic dignitaries to ban Peshischa Hasidism. Some say his name was Yerachmiel Tzvi.
    - Grand Rabbi Nosson Dovid Rabinowicz of Szydlowiec (1814 - 1866) - Son of R. Yerachmiel, he studied under R. Yissachar Ber Baron, the first Radoshitzer Rebbe. R. Nosson Dovid abandoned the doctrines of Peshischa Hasidism and instead adopted a kabbalistic and miracle-centric view of Hasidism.
      - Grand Rabbi Yaakov Yitzchak Rabinowicz (II) (1847 - 1905) - First Biala Rebbe. The son of R. Nosson Dovid, he married the daughter of R. Yehoshua of Ostrov (author of "Toldos Adam"). After his father-in-law's death he moved to Biała Podlaska, where he established his own Hasidic court and unlike his father, he embraced most parts of Peshischa Hasidism. Despite this, he still vehemently opposed the activities of maskilim, whom he described as "little foxes destroying the vineyard of the Lord". His teachings were posthumously published by his son R. Abraham under the title "Divrei Binah".
        - Grand Rabbi Yerachmiel Tzvi Rabinowicz (II) (1880 - 1906) - Son of R. Yaakov Yitzchak (II), he was an accomplished violinist and a painter and held a Hasidic court in Siedlice.
          - Grand Rabbi Yechiel Yehoshua Rabinowicz (1900 - 1981) - Second Biala Rebbe. The son of R. Yerachmiel Tzvi (II), he was raised by his grandfather R. Leibish of Ozarov. In 1923, he become the rebbe of Siedlice. He managed to escape Nazi occupied Poland, instead fleeing to the Russian-controlled zone, from which he was exiled to Siberia. In 1947 he immigrated to Mandatory Palestine and settled in Tel Aviv. He was in the forefront of activity to maintain adherence to traditional Judaism amongst the masses. He was one of the founders of the Chinuch Atzmai educational network, and he served on the Moetzes Gedolei HaTorah.
            - Grand Rabbi Bezalel Simcha Menachem Ben-Zion Rabinowicz (1935 - 2024) - Third Biala Rebbe. The son of R. Yechiel Yehoshua, he served as the rabbi of the city of Lugano. He was a member of the Agudat Yisrael.
              - Grand Rabbi Yitzchak Yosef Dov Rabinowicz - Fourth and current Biala Rebbe. The son of R. Bezalel Simcha Menachem Ben-Zion.
              - Rabbi Chaim Yehuda Leibish Rabinowicz - Rov of K'hal Shaarei Mordechai in Manchester. The son of R. Bezalel Simcha Menachem Ben-Zion.
                - Grand Rabbi Asher Yeshaya Rabinowicz - Current Biala Rebbe of New City. The son of R. Chaim Yehuda Leibish.
            - Grand Rabbi David Matisyahu Rabinowicz (1927 - 1997) - Biala Rebbe of Bnei Brak. He founded the Yeshiva "Biala Or Kedoshim". The son of R. Yechiel Yehoshua.
              - Grand Rabbi Yaakov Menachem - Biala Rebbe of Bnei Brak. The son of R. David Matisyahu.
              - Grand Rabbi Aharon Shlomo Chaim Eleazar Rabinowicz, Biala Rebbe of Boro Park. The son of R. David Matisyahu.
              - Grand Rabbi Avraham Yerachmiel Rabinowicz - Ostrov-Biala Rebbe. The son of R. David Matisyahu.
            - Grand Rabbi Yitzchak Yaakov Menachem Rabinowicz (1926 - 2010) - Biala Rebbe of Ramat Aharon. The Son of R. Yechiel Yehoshua. Was from the first students with which the Punivitz Rosh Yeshiva opened the Yeshiva in 1943. First lived in Petach Tikva where he gave lectures in Gemura Beiyun (in-depth) in the Viznitz Bais Hamedrash at the request of the Viznitz Rabbi the Yeshuois Moshe. Later moved to Bnei Brak and opened a Bais Hamedrash for his followers.
              - Grand Rabbi Baruch Shlomo Leib Rabinowicz - Biala Rebbe of Har Yonah. The son of R. Yitzchak Yaakov Menachem.
              - Grand Rabbi David Yerachmiel Tzvi Rabinowicz - Biala Rebbe of Ramat Aharon. The son of R. Yitzchak Yaakov Menachem.
            - Grand Rabbi Yerachmiel Tzvi Yehuda Rabinowicz (1923 - 2003) - Biala-Peshischa Rebbe. The son of R. Yechiel Yehoshua. He moved to the neighbourhood of Har Nof, where he established the Beit Midrash "Toldot Yechiel Biala-Peshisha".
              - Grand Rabbi Yaakov Elimelech Rabinowitz - Biala-Peshischa Rebbe of Ashdod. The son of R. Yerachmiel Tzvi Yehuda.
              - Grand Rabbi Chaim Yitzchak Menachem Mendel Rabinowicz - Biala-Peshischa Rebbe of Bnei Brak. The son of R. Yerachmiel Tzvi Yehuda.
              - Grand Rabbi Aharon Moshe Eliezer Rabinowicz - Current Biala-Peshischa Rebbe. The son of R. Yerachmiel Tzvi Yehuda, he took over his father's Beit Midrash in Har Nof.
              - Grand Rabbi Baruch Leib Rabinowicz - Current Biala Rebbe of London. The son of R. Yerachmiel Tzvi Yehuda.
              - Grand Rabbi Simcha Ben-Zion Yitzchak Rabinowicz - Biala-Peshicha Rebbe of Ramat Shlomo. The son of R. Yerachmiel Tzvi Yehuda.
          - Grand Rabbi Nathan David Rabinowicz (1899 - 1947) - Son of R. Yerachmiel Tzvi (II), he was the Biala Rebbe of London. He married the daughter of R. Alter Yisroel Shimon Perlow I (1874 - 1933), 2nd Novominsker Rebbe. He moved to London in 1927 where he established a shtiebel off Brick Lane. His ethical will, "Divrei David" was published in London in 1948.
            - Rabbi Tzvi Rabinowicz (1919 - 2002) - Author of several academic works on Hasidism.
        - Grand Rabbi Nosson Dovid Rabinowicz (II) (1868 - 1930) - Parzcever / Partzover Rebbe. The son of R. Yaakov Yitzchak (II), and a staunch opponent of the Haskalah and Zionism. He married the daughter of R. Yechiel Yaakov Hopsztajn (1846–1866), the fifth Kozhnitzer Rebbe.
          - Grand Rabbi Moshe Yechiel Elimelech Rabinowicz (1895 - 1942) - Son of R. Natan David (II). He married the daughter of R. Yisroel Szapira, son of R. Elimelech Szapira, the Grodzhisker Rebbe (1823 - 1892). He authored several works in Warsaw.
          - Avraham Yaakov Shapira, Drohobycer Rebbe, son in law of Rabbi Nosson Dovid, married Esther Golda and lived in Yerushalayim. His son in law, Dr. Avrohom Glasner lived in Yerushalayim. Dr. Glasner's son in law Dr. Moshe Shmuel Glasner resides in Yerushalayim.
          - Grand Rabbi Baruch Yehoshua Yerachmiel Rabinowicz (1913 - 1997) - Son of R. Natan David (II). He married the daughter of R. Chaim Elazar Spira, the fifth Munkacser Rebbe, after he death he succeeded. Unlike his both his father and father-in-law, R. Baruch was sympathetic to Zionism and the State of Israel. Because of his progressive beliefs, the Hasidim of Munkacs crowned his son, R. Moshe Leib as the Munkacser Rebbe. R. Baruch later moved to Petah Tikva where he headed a small Beis Hamedrash until his death in 1997.
            - Grand Rabbi Moshe Leib Rabinovich (b. 1940) - Seventh and present Munkacser Rebbe. Son of R. Baruch Yehoshua Yerachmiel. Throughout his life, he maintained a close relationship with the Satmar Rebbe, R. Joel Teitelbaum, several of whose children his children married.
            - Grand Rabbi Yitzchok Yaakov Rabinowicz (b. circa 1942) - Current Dinover Rebbe. Son of R. Baruch Yehoshua Yerachmiel. His Chassidus and Beis Medrash relocated to Williamsburg (Brooklyn) NY, where a large mosdos has grown with his guidance.

== Main books ==
- Toldos Adam (by Rebbe Yehoshua of Ostrova, the father-in-law of the first Biala Rebbe)
- Divrei Binah (by the first Biala Rebbe)
- Aron Eidus (by Rebbe Shraga Yoir of Białobrzegi, the brother of the Divrei Binah)
- Zichron Mishlei (by Rebbe Meir Shlomo of Mezritch, the son of the Divrei Binah)
- Yeshuas Avraham (by Rebbe Avrohom Yehoshua Heshl of Lublin, the son of the Divrei Binah)
- Chelkas Yehoshua and Seder HaYom (by Rebbe Yechiel Yehoshua)
- Lehavas David (by Rebbe Dovid Matisyahu of Biala-Bnei Brak)
- Mevaser Tov (by Rebbe Ben-Zion of Biala)—parts of which have been translated into English

A translation of Seder HaYom into English has been published by the Biala Rebbe of America. The version of the prayer-book used by Biala Hasidim is called Siddur Chelkas Yehoshua.

== See also ==
- Hasidic Judaism in Poland
