= Aaron Cupino =

Aaron Cupino was a talmudist and head of a yeshiva at Constantinople, who flourished about the close of the 17th century.

He was a pupil of Ḥayyim Shabbethai at Ottoman Salonica (now Thessaloniki in Greece), whence he afterward moved to Constantinople. Here he founded a Talmudic school, from which were graduated several pupils who afterward acquired notable reputations, among whom were Aaron ben Isaac Sason and Isaac Raphael Alfandari. Aaron Cupino maintained a scholarly correspondence with R. Benveniste (1601–76), the author of the Keneset haGedolah, and with several other scholars.
