= Solomon Eliezer Alfandari =

Ottoman rabbi, kabbalist and rosh yeshiva (c.1826–1930)

Rabbi Solomon Eliezer Alfandari שלמה אליעזר אלפנדרי
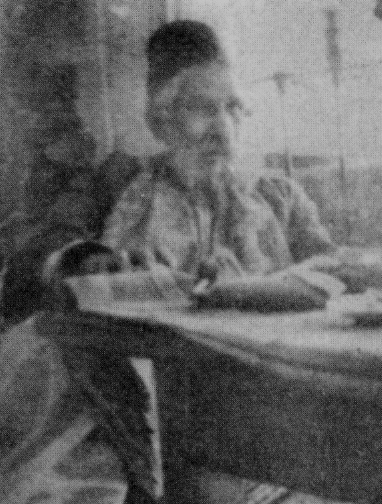

Personal life
- Born: c. 1826 Constantinople, Ottoman Empire
- Died: 20 May 1930 (aged about 104) Jerusalem, Mandatory Palestine
- Parent(s): Yaakov and Chana Alfandari

Religious life
- Religion: Judaism
- Position: Rosh yeshiva, Istanbul; Chief Rabbi of Damascus, Ottoman Syria; Chief Rabbi of Safed

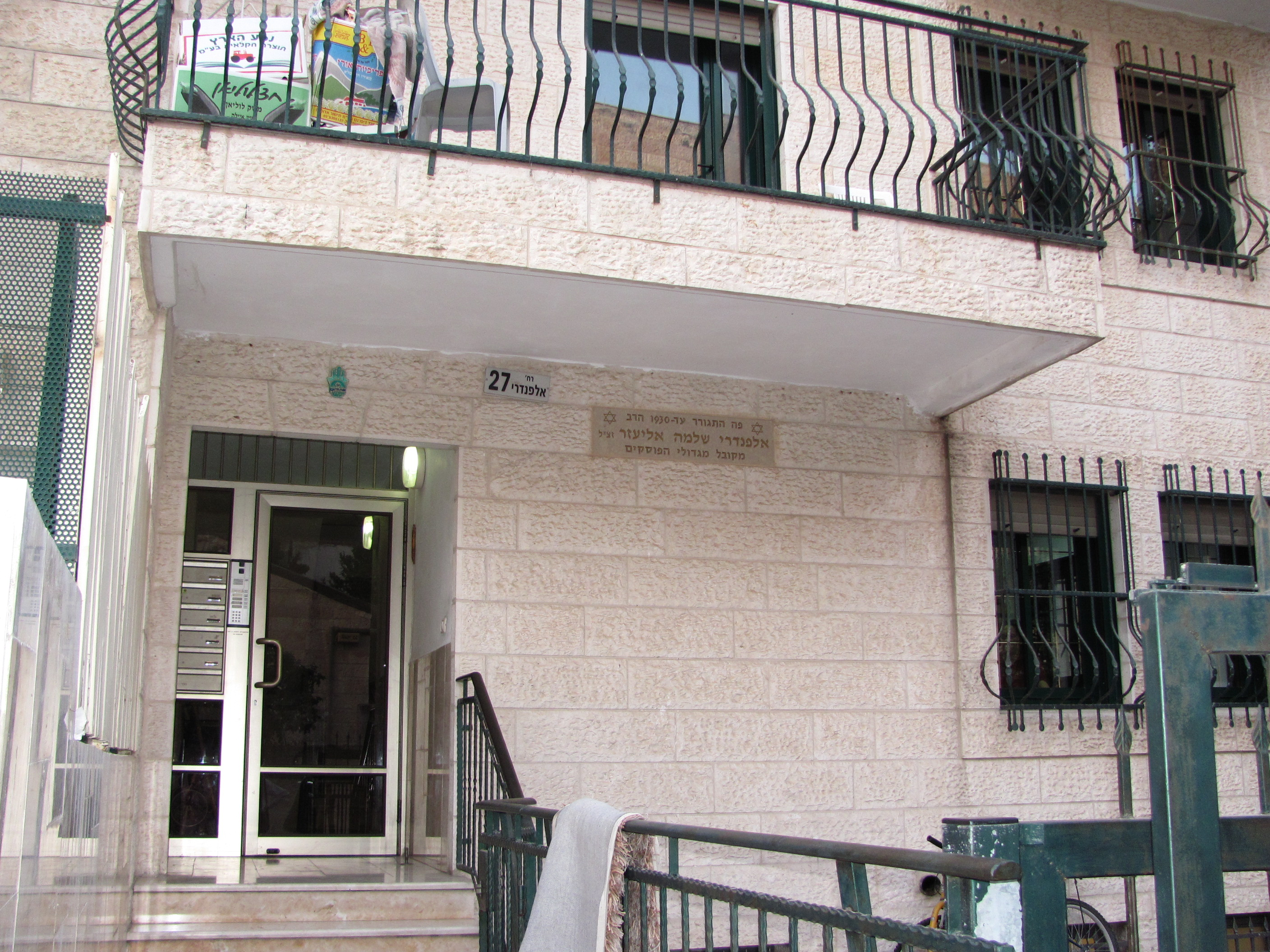
A plaque is affixed beside the doorway of a new apartment building at 27 Alfandari Street, Jerusalem. The original home that was razed for the construction of this building was the home of Rabbi Solomon Eliezer Alfandari in the original Ruchama neighborhood (founded 1921, now Mekor Baruch). The plaque reads: "Here lived until 1930 Rabbi Shlomo Eliezer Alfandari, a Kabbalist and one of the great Poskim".

Solomon Eliezer Alfandari (Hebrew: שלמה אליעזר אלפנדרי; c. 1826 – 20 May 1930), also known as the Saba Kadisha ("Holy Grandfather"), was a distinguished rabbi, kabbalist and rosh yeshiva in his native home of Istanbul , and later served as Chief Rabbi of Damascus, Syria Vilayet, and Safed, Beirut Vilayet. He was known for his stringent interpretation of halakha and his uncompromising dedication to Orthodox Judaism.

== Early life ==
The Saba Kadisha was born in Ottoman Constantinople around 1826 (some say as early as 1820) to a distinguished family of Torah scholars. His father, Yaakov, was a Talmudic scholar; his grandfather, Rabbi Ḥayyim ben Yaakov Alfandari, authored Maggid MiReishit, and his great-grandfather, Rabbi Yaakov ben Ḥayyim Alfandari, authored Mutzal MiEish. His mother, Chana, also came from an illustrious family.

== Biography ==
=== Constantinople ===
As a youth, Solomon Eliezer was noted for his sharp understanding of Torah subjects. Yet he refused to accept a rabbinical position or to wear the customary dress of the city's sages. He did agree to join the Vaad Haruchani (Spiritual Council) of Constantinople, and accepted the position of rosh yeshiva in a yeshiva which the city's Jews founded for him. In the latter post, he taught many outstanding scholars, including Rabbi Chaim Hezekiah Medini, later known as the Sdei Chemed.

While in Constantinople, his son died at an early age, which was followed by the death of Alfandari's wife. He never remarried.

=== Damascus ===
The Saba Kadisha decided to leave Constantinople to accept the position of Chief Rabbi of Damascus, which he was appointed to by imperial decree in 1888. There he founded a yeshiva which trained dozens of students who served as rabbis and dayanim in Sephardic communities in the region.

Following his appointment (succeeding Isaac ben Moses Abulafia), Alfandari ran into troubles with the community for his lack of ability to negotiate with local authorities, worsened by the fact that he did not know Arabic or Ottoman Turkish. He also became alienated from his religious supporters, leading to a rift between him and the Jewish community. The community alleged that he was too traditional, and that his views and education were incompatible with the modern order. After the Young Turk Revolution of 1908, the Jews of Damascus demanded that Alfandari be removed from his post, and he was subsequently dismissed by the Minister of Justice, the authority responsible for non-Muslim religious affairs.

=== Safed ===
At almost 90 years of age, he moved to Palestine, then also a part of Ottoman Syria. At first he lived for several years in the city of Haifa, but then accepted the invitation of the Torah leaders of Safed, in the Beirut Vilayet, to serve as their Chief Rabbi, a position he held until 1918.

=== Jerusalem ===
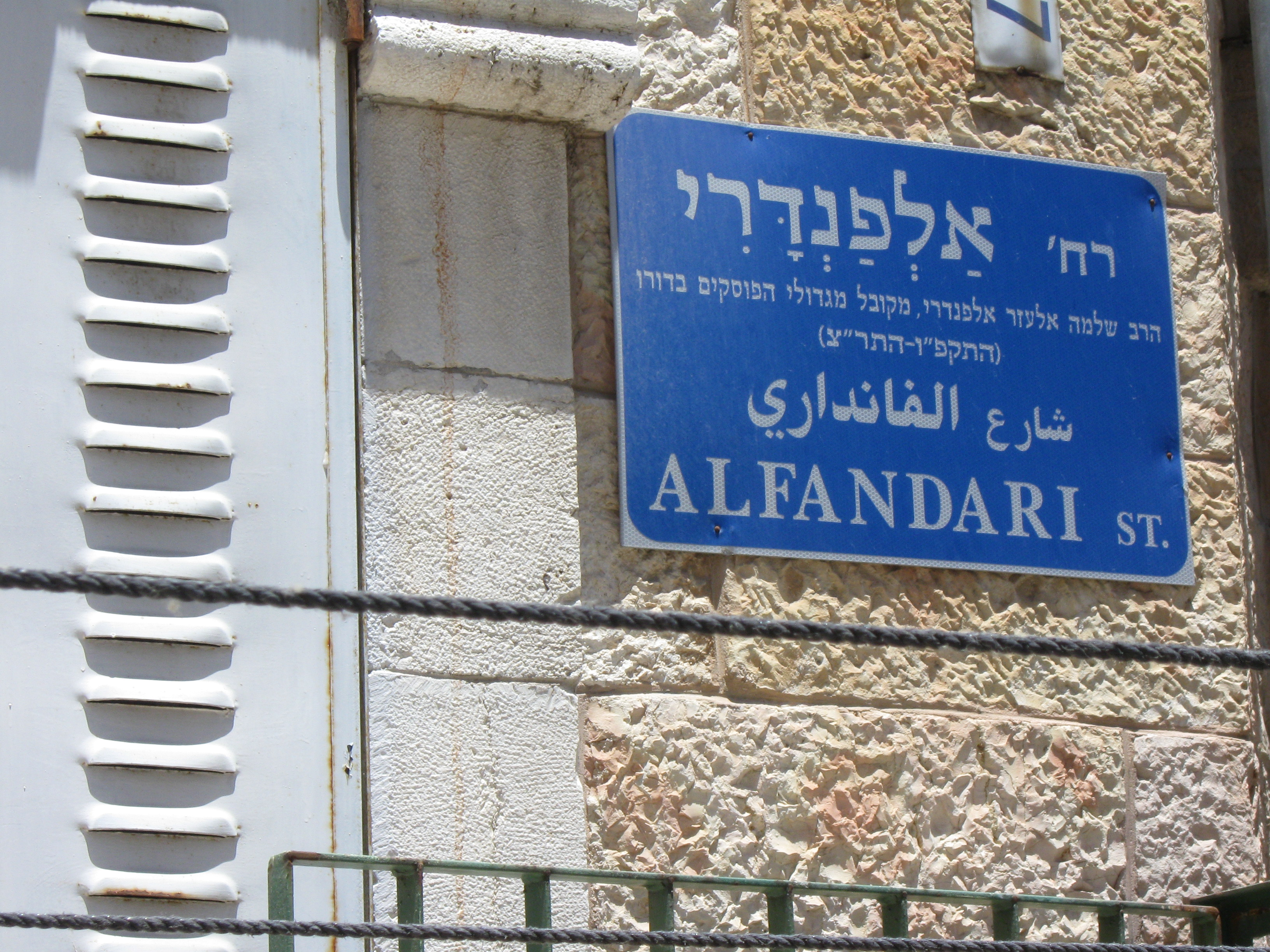
The Jerusalem street on which Alfandari lived has been named after him.

In his final years, Alfandari suffered many ailments, for which he sought medical treatment in Jerusalem. Although he tried to travel incognito, many Torah leaders desired to meet him when they found out he was in their city. One of these gedolim was Rabbi Ezra Attiya, who later became rosh yeshiva of Porat Yosef Yeshiva. The Saba Kadisha held Rabbi Attiya in high esteem, and would always stand up for him when he visited.

In 1925, Alfandari developed a serious illness while in Tiberias. He refused to be treated in the local hospital, where the rules of tzniut (modesty) were not meticulously observed, and was taken to Shaarei Tzedek Hospital in Jerusalem instead. After he recovered, Jerusalem's sages begged him to stay in their city. He rented an apartment in the Ruchama neighbourhood (today Mekor Baruch).

There he hosted meetings with many prominent Torah scholars who came to consult with him and speak with him in learning. These included: Rabbi Tzvi Pesach Frank, Chief Rabbi of Jerusalem; Rabbi Velvel Mintzberg, leader of the Ashkenazi community in the Old Yishuv; Rabbi Avraham Weinberg of Slonim, author of Birkas Avraham; and Rabbi Yitzchak Abuchatzeira, brother of the Baba Sali and a Torah sage in his own right. Shortly before the Saba Kadisha's death, the Munkatcher Rebbe, Rabbi Chaim Elazar Spira, of Hungary made a special trip to meet him. Theirs was considered an historic meeting between two worlds, the Sephardi genius of the Middle East and the Hasidic tradition of Eastern Europe.

Alfandari contracted pneumonia in May 1930 and was treated by Dr. Moshe Wallach of Shaarei Tzedek Hospital. His disease worsened, however, and he died on 20 May 1930 (22 Iyar 5690), while the Munkatcher Rebbe was at his bedside. His funeral was attended by thousands, as his students carried his casket on foot from his home all the way to the Mount of Olives. He was nearly 110 years old.

== Views ==
During his move from Syria to Palestine, the Saba Kadisha stopped off in Beirut, where many questions were addressed to him regarding shmita (the laws of the Sabbatical year). His responses indicate that he strongly opposed the heter mechira which Israel's Chief Rabbinate had adopted to spare its farmers from loss.

Rabbi Solomon Eliezer was a strong opponent of the Zionist National Council (Vaad Haleumi), which, in British Mandate Palestine, automatically enlisted all Jews, unless they opted out. Rav Alfandari signed legal rulings obligating every Jew to opt out.

Alfandari was known for his opposition to the Rabbinate, as well as his disagreements with Rav Kook concerning Zionism and modernity.

He forbade the shaving of beards, even using scissors or depilatory cream. He even refused to speak with a talmid chacham who did not have a beard, even if the discussion concerned the Talmud.

== Legacy ==
The street on which Alfandari lived in Jerusalem was named in his memory.

Sephardic lore says that Ezra Attiya visited the grave of Alfandari when his wife was ill, and attributed her recovery to the miraculous intervention of Alfandari. The story is told that when Rabbi Solomon Eliezer went outside to bless the new moon with his congregants at the beginning of the month of Nisan 5674 (April 1914), he looked up after completing the blessings, clapped his hands and cried loudly. He explained, "I see that a large-scale war will soon break out." Four months later, World War I began.

== Works ==
All of Alfandari's responsa and halakhic rulings were published posthumously. These include:

- She'eilot U'teshuvot MaHaRSHa, Yitzchak Nissim, ed., Jerusalem, 1932
- She'eilot U'teshuvot Saba Kadisha, D. Y. Weiss, ed., Jerusalem, 1973–4.

His letters were collected in Masos Yerushalayim, Kumi Roni and Amudei Arazim.

== See also ==
- Alfandari
