= Algazi =

Algazi (Hebrew: אלגאזי) is a Sephardi Jewish surname. People with the surname include:

- Hayyim Isaac Algazi (died 1819), rabbi
- Hayyim ben Menahem Algazi (17th century), rabbi
- Israel Yaakov Algazi (1680–1757), rabbi
- Solomon Nissim Algazi (1610 – c. 1683), rabbi
- Yom Tov Algazi (1727–1802), rabbi
