= Hayyim ben Jacob Alfandari =

Sephardic Jewish educator and author (1588–1640)

Hayyim ben Jacob Alfandari (1588 – 1640) was a talmudic educator and writer, teaching at Constantinople in 1618. He was the pupil of Aaron ben Joseph Sason. Some of his responsa were published in the Maggid me-Reshit (He Tells from the Beginning), Constantinople, 1710, which contains also the responsa of his son Isaac Raphael, and which was edited by his grandson Hayyim ben Isaac Raphael. His novellæ on several Talmudic treatises are still extant in manuscript.

== Jewish Encyclopedia bibliography ==
- Azulai, Shem ha-Gedolim, s.v.;
- Michael, Heimann Joseph, (1891) Or ha-Ḥayyim, Frankfort-on-the-Main (in Hebrew), No. 853;
- Steinschneider, Cat. Bodl. No. 4668.

== See also ==
- Alfandari
