= Batei Munkacs =

Neighborhood of Jerusalem, Israel

Coordinates: 31.781°N 35.214°E

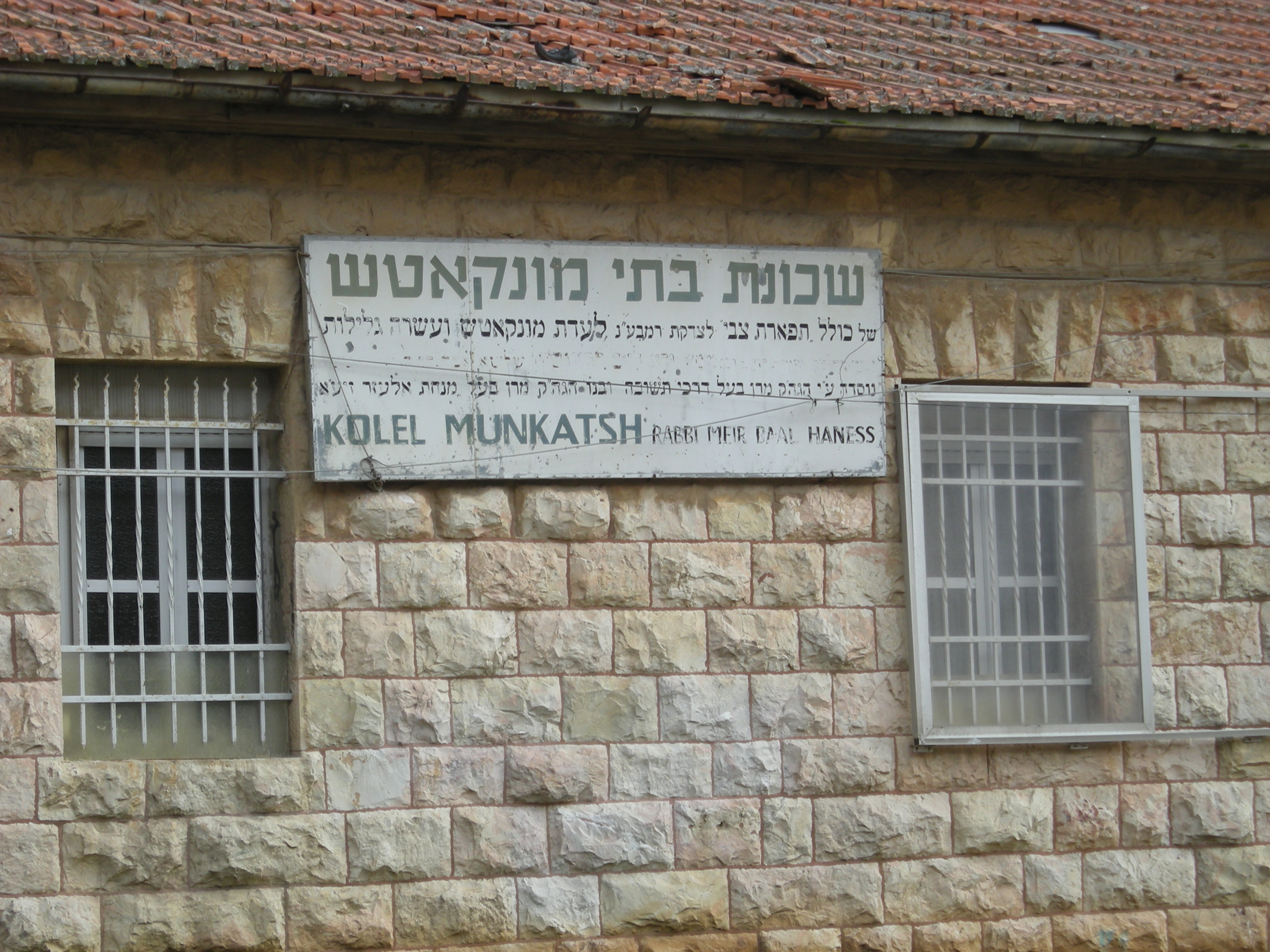
Neighborhood sign on apartment building in Batei Munkacs

Batei Munkacs (Hebrew: בתי מונקאטש, lit. 'Munkacs Houses'), also spelled Batei Munkatsh, officially Batei Munkacs Tiferes Zvi, is a former courtyard neighborhood in Jerusalem. Established in 1928 by the Munkacser Rebbe, Rabbi Chaim Elazar Spira, Batei Munkacs is now part of the Nachlaot neighborhood.

== Location ==
Batei Munkacs is bordered by Yizrael Street to the south, Netziv Street to the west, the neighborhood of Batei Rand to the north, Shomron Street to the northeast and Mesilas Yesharim Street to the east.

== History ==
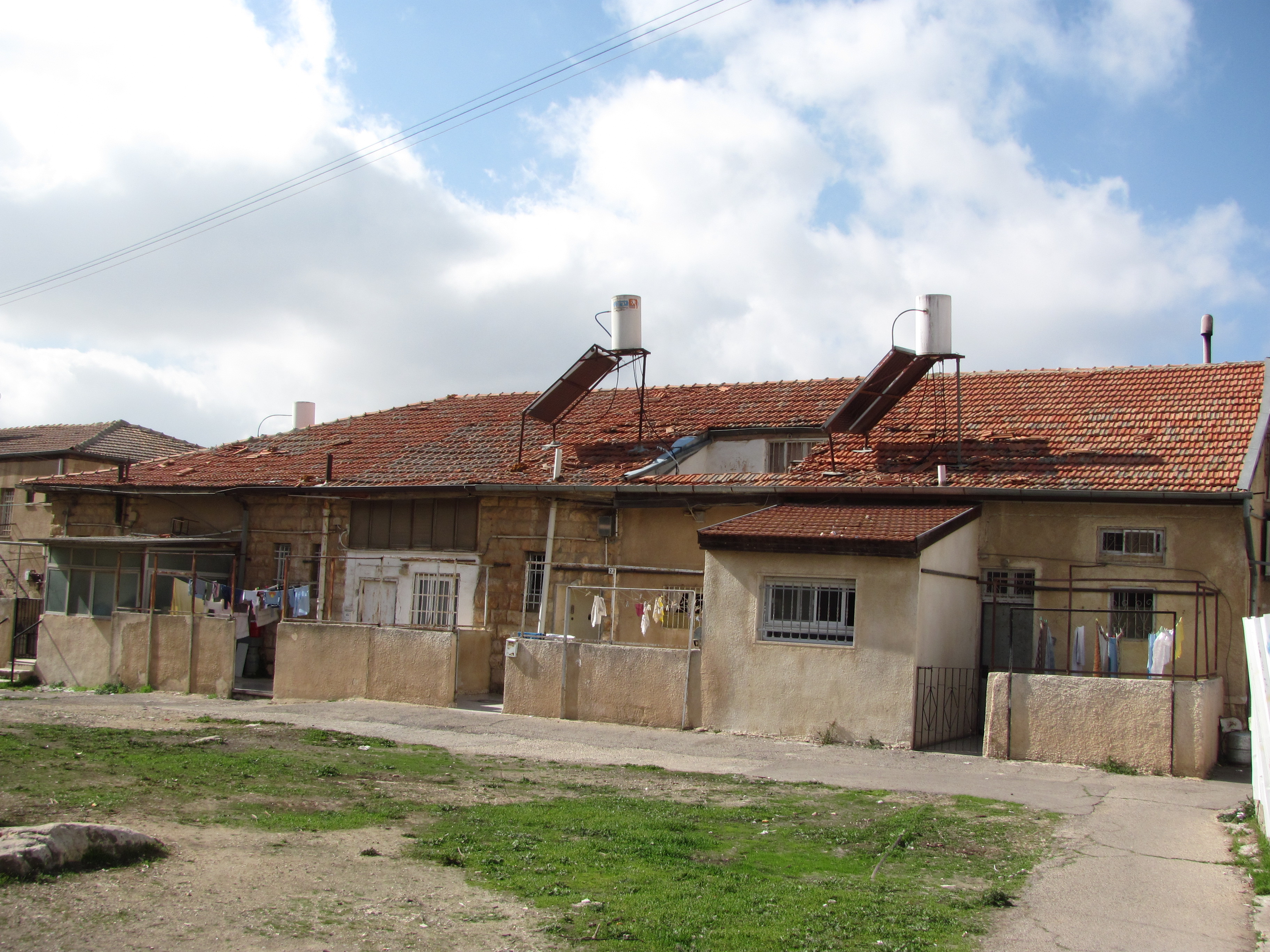
A row house in Batei Munkacs, with partial view of courtyard

Batei Munkacs was founded in 1928 by the Munkacser Rebbe, Rabbi Chaim Elazar Spira, as a housing project for members of the Munkacser Kollel, Kollel Tiferes Zvi, a charity organization that supported families from Munkács, Hungary, living in Jerusalem. The land was purchased in 1914 by two Hasidim sent by the Rebbe, but the outbreak of World War I halted building plans. Construction was further delayed until 1929, apparently due to a lack of funds. Batei Munkacs was one of only a handful of new neighborhoods constructed during the British Mandate era. It was the seventh, and last, Haredi neighborhood established in the Nachlaot area.

While the Munkacser Hasidim intended to build on the entire tract of land, only three buildings – two row houses at either end, and a synagogue building in the center – were eventually erected due to a lack of resources. Like other kollel neighborhoods constructed at the end of the Ottoman period, such as Batei Ungarin, the buildings of Batei Munkacs were planned around a courtyard, with the synagogue in the center of the courtyard. Each apartment had a kitchen and bathroom in the entrance hall, and two rooms located to the rear. According to a 1914 newspaper report, the Munkacser Rebbe intended that each homeowner would also have room for a small vegetable garden in front of his apartment.

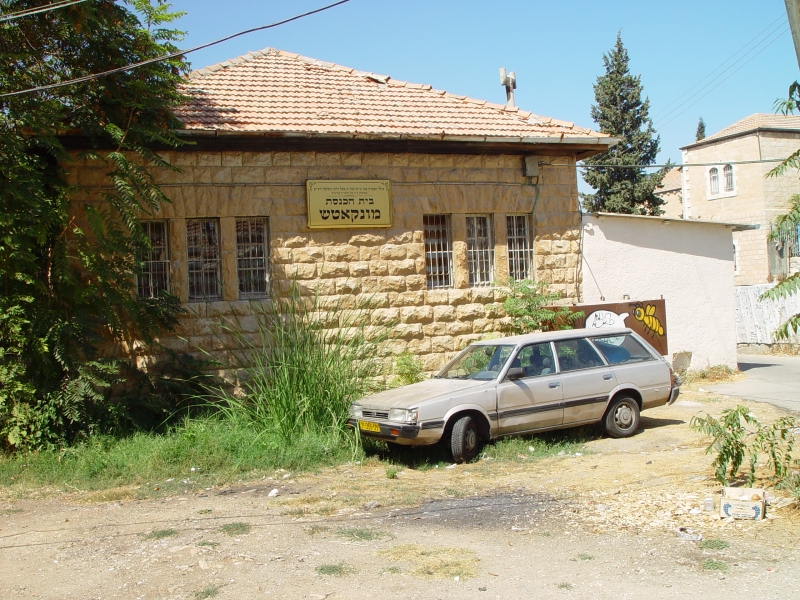
The side of the Batei Munkacs synagogue in Jerusalem. The entrance to the synagogue is on the right side of the building.

The neighborhood regulations, approved and signed by the Munkacser Rebbe during his visit to Palestine in 1930, sought to maintain the integrity of the neighborhood as a Hasidic enclave. Residents were required to wear Hasidic dress (levush), and were not allowed to shave their beards or payot (sidelocks). Like members of other Hasidic sects in Palestine, the Munkacser Hasidim were enjoined to send their children to Haredi schools, and not to schools run by Zionist pedagogues. Residents were also required to support the neighborhood synagogue by praying there at least once a week on weekdays, and on at least one Shabbat every two months. The synagogue adheres to the prayer customs of the Munkacser Hasidism.

The Munkacser Rebbe visited Palestine for the first time in the spring of 1930. He spent one Shabbat in Batei Munkacs, where he was hosted by a homeowner. A huge outdoor awning was erected for his Friday-night tish, which was attended by myriads of Jerusalem residents.

== The neighborhood today ==
Batei Munkacs continues to be occupied by Haredi families in the 21st century. It is home to about 30 families. The yahrtzeit of the Munkacser Rebbe, Rabbi Chaim Elazar Spira, on 2 Sivan is commemorated in the synagogue with refreshments after the prayer services.
