= Aaron Sason =

Aaron Sason may refer to:

- Aaron ben Isaac Sason (born 1629), Jewish Ottoman author and Talmudist
- Aaron ben Joseph Sason, Jewish Ottoman author and Talmudist
