= Sason (disambiguation) =

Sason is a district in the Batman Province of Turkey

Sason may also refer to:

- Sason (spider), genus of spiders
- Sason (Σάσων), ancient Greek name of Sazan Island, Albania
- Sason, historical region of Armenia

== People ==
- Aaron Sason:
  - Aaron ben Isaac Sason, Jewish Ottoman author and Talmudist
  - Aaron ben Joseph Sason, Jewish Ottoman author and Talmudist
- Anani ben Sason – Jewish Talmudist of the 3rd century CE
- Joshua Sason, American entrepreneur, investor, and entertainment producer
- Roy Sason – Israeli association football player (born 2001)
- Sixten Sason – Swedish industrial designer (1912–1967)
