= Hayyim ben Abraham ha-Kohen =

Jewish rabbi and writer (1585–1655)

- חיים בן אברהם הכהן

Personal life
- Born: c. 1585 Egypt (disputed)
- Died: May 2, 1655 Livorno
- Resting place: Livorno
- Notable work(s): Torat hakham, Mekor hayyim
- Occupation: Rabbi, writer

Religious life
- Religion: Judaism

Jewish leader
- Teacher: Hayyim ben Joseph Vital

Hayyim ben Abraham ha-Kohen (חיים בן אברהם הכהן; c. 1585–May 2, 1655) was a Jewish rabbi and writer. He spent his early career in Aleppo, tracing his lineage to "Don Joseph ha-Kohen the Spaniard". He was a disciple of Hayyim ben Joseph Vital in Damascus, and a teacher of Nathan ben Moses Hannover in Livorno. His customs and teachings are cited in the Hemdat Yamim.

== Early life ==
Following their expulsion from Spain in 1492, his Sephardic ancestors relocated to the land of Israel before eventually settling in Aleppo. Hayyim's birthplace is disputed; it may be Aleppo or Egypt.

Of his early life, Hayyim writes only that "[i]n my youth the spirit of God lifted me and gave me an tongue fit to know and to ask and to answer Torah matters, and to gather crowds to synagogue study halls, teaching the laws of Passover on Passover and the laws of Shavuot on every sabbath . . ." On instructions from Vital, he "abandoned all non-Lurianic books and read nothing except Nachmanides and what other books are cited by Luria".

== Travels ==
In c. 1650, Hayyim traveled to Istanbul to print the first part of his Mekor Hayyim, a Kabbalistic commentary on the Shulchan Aruch, and remained there for several years. During this time, "he was very careful not to write amulets. He would take only the time necessary to recite prayers, saying 'I wish to spend the time at study, which others devote to continual prayer', and he studied all day and all night". In 1652 he met with Samuel Aboab in Venice to pursue further publication, and in 1653 we find him in İzmir. In 1654 his Torat Hakham, a book of sermons, was printed in Venice; other parts of his Mekor hayyim were printed in Amsterdam and Livorno in 1655. Abraham Cardoso wrote c. 1668 that "I went to Egypt [in c. 1659 (!)], seeking succor for my troubled soul, and I lived there five years. I sought to have this affliction healed by Hayyim ha-Kohen . . . I also found there Benjamin ha-Levi". Some have interpreted this to mean that Hayyim was born in Egypt, but Cardoso probably met him in Italy and misremembered. In the introduction to his Torat Hakham, Hayyim writes that

I decided to publish my books for the benefit of others, and first I sent my commentary on Esther to the press, it being short and symbolic of the miracles which occur despite difficult beginnings. But after I sent it, many years passed without response—for these were no generous men—and so, as the time passed and I grew more and more depressed, I decided to go myself to publish all of my books. Because of the great melancholy in my heart, I did not make copies of my manuscripts, in order to cause no delay, and I immediately set out from here (!), Aleppo, by ship. We had been at sea only one day when we came to a certain port, known to be dangerous, where we were held for five days by calm. There one frigate from Malta came upon us by night at the end of the sixth day, and the infidels had nearly overpowered us when I saw that there was no hope, so I cast myself into the sea and the waves, and the water rose to my neck, but slowly God brought me to dry land and saved be from my captors . . . After this my travails were so many on account of the hunger and the beasts, that the number of miracles which God performed for me—blessed by the One who pays out goodness to the condemned—equalled the bitter hardship of my lost manuscripts, twenty years' restless work . . . all because not one man had been kind enough to publish even my smallest book . . . But I said to myself, I will attempt to rewrite them as they were before . . .

Before embarking on the journey, he performed a dreamquest, and, assured of ten more years of life, he left with the intention to return for burial in Israel.

== Death ==
He died less than ten years later, on May 2, 1655 and was buried in Livorno. Moses Babo of Rome delivered a eulogy. After Hayyim's death, David Lida published a commentary on the Book of Ruth under the title Migdol David; later scholars, such as Jacob Emden, Chaim Yosef David Azulai, and Heimann Joseph Michael, considered the true author to have been Hayyim ha-Kohen. Chaim Yosef David Azulai prostrated himself before Hayyim's grave.

== Works ==
=== Printed works ===
- Torat hakham (Venice, 1654), a book of sermons in two volumes, redacted by Moses Zacuto
- Mekor hayyim, Kabbalistic commentary on the Shulchan Aruch
  - Mekor hayyim (Amsterdam, 1650? 1655?, 1697), later called Tur odem
  - Tur pitda (Mekor hayyim II) (Livorno, 1655)
  - Tur bareket, also printed under Mekor hayyim (Istanbul, [1650?], redacted by Abraham Shushan; Amsterdam, 1654)
  - Tur yahalom (Mekor hayyim IV) (Livorno, [1655?]), lost except ff. 333-372, containing the laws of mourning. His death may have arrested publication; Samuel Wiener supposes that the laws of mourning were specially printed for his kin.
- (A certain "Hayyim ha-Kohen" contributed an introduction to his master Israel Benveniste (1618-1688)'s Beit yisrael (Istanbul, 1680), and Samuel Joseph Fuenn identifies him as Hayyim ben Avraham. This author was, however, apparently alive at the time of publication.)
- Torat hesed (Amsterdam, 1680) on the Book of Ruth, published by David Lida as his own work under the title Migdol david
- "Dodi yarad legano ler'ot baganim", poem printed as early as Nathan Hanover's Sha'arei tzion (Prague, 1662, 1692) ff. 10r-12r. Later published independently with commentary by Moshe Amar (Jerusalem, 2018).
- "Kol baramah nishmah bilala", elegy printed in the same work, ff. 4v-5r
- Sha'arei rahamim (Thessaloniki, 1741), Lurianic liturgical comments
- Sha'arei ratzon (Thessaloniki, 1741), further Lurianic liturgical comments
- Commentary to Ein Yaakov, of which only the first two folios survive, in a possible holograph manuscript. Published in Kovetz beit aharon veyisrael. 1993. 8 (1): 5-15.
- Siddur rabbenu hayyim: chelek aleph (Jerusalem, 2009), collection of Lurianic liturgy
- Ateret zahav (Petah Tikvah, 2019), on Esther. Apparently a partial holograph MS at NLI Oct. 1581.

=== Manuscript works ===
- Menorat zahav, on Ecclesiastes.
- Tokhahat musar, on the Book of Job
- Contributions to various collections of Lurianic liturgy. Also cited by Hayyim ben Menahem Algazi in Bene hayye (Istanbul, 1712) f. 9v, etc.
- Kabbalistic commentary to Esther, distinct from the Ateret zahav

=== Lost works ===
Hayyim mentions the following works in the introduction to Torat hakham, lost in manuscript on his voyage to Venice:

- Mefashar helmin, on the Book of Daniel
- Ateret shalom, on Song of Songs
- Meginat lev, on the Book of Lamentations
- "some comments on . . . Isaiah and a commentary to the Pentateuch"

Chaim Yosef David Azulai describes a third commentary to Esther, literal in style
