= Elijah Alfandari =

Elijah Alfandari (Hebrew: אליהו אלפנדארי) was a writer on matrimonial law, and rabbi at Constantinople in the latter half of the 18th and in the beginning of the 19th century. He published two works on matrimonial law, Seder Eliyahu Rabbah we-Zuṭṭa (The Great and Small Order of Elijah), Constantinople, 1719, and Miktav me-Eliyahu (A Letter from Elijah), Constantinople, 1723. His cousin, Ḥayyim Alfandari (the Younger), in a question of law which he submitted to him, refers to him as a great authority in rabbinical law.

== See also ==
- Alfandari
