= Moses ha-Levi ha-Nazir =

Rabbi of the 17th-century

Moses ha-Levi ha-Nazir was a rabbi of the 17th century. He was the father of Joseph ha-Levi and son-in-law of the Talmudist Abraham ibn Hananiah, rabbi of Hebron and pupil of Joseph di Trani. He is also mentioned as a messenger from the Holy Land. This accounts for the fact that he is met with in many places, including Constantinople, Greece, and Morea.

== Sources ==
Jewish Encyclopedia bibliography: Chaim Azulai, Shem ha-Gedolim, p. 136.
