= Joshua ben Israel Benveniste =

Ottoman rabbi

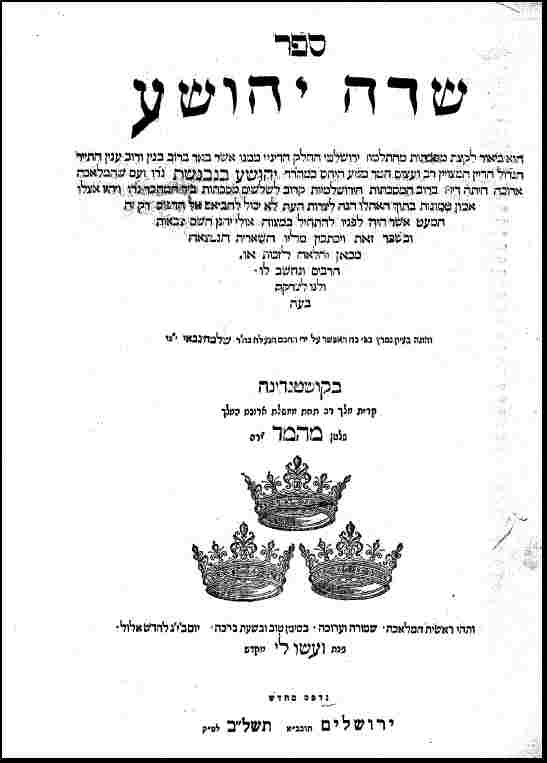
The title page of Sedeh Yehoshua (1662 Edition)

Joshua ben Israel Benveniste (c. 1590 – c. 1668) was a Sephardic Jewish physician and rabbi at Constantinople. He was the brother of Chaim Benveniste, and a disciple of Joseph Trani. His works include sermons, a commentary on the Jerusalem Talmud, a treatise on the high holiday prayer service, and a study of Jewish divorce laws. Despite his significant contributions, many of his works remain in manuscript form.

== Life ==
Benveniste was brother of Hakham Chaim Benveniste, renowned for his influential work, ''Kenesset ha-Gedolah''. Both Joshua and Hayyim studied under Hakham Joseph Trani at the yeshivah in Constantinople.

Hakham Joshua Benveniste was recognized for his extensive contributions to Jewish scholarship and practice, and was also known for his role as a physician. He prepared (1) Mishmeret Ha-Miẓvot (Observance of the Commandments), a metrical version of the Azharot, with commentary; and (2) Lebush Malkut (Royal Garment), a hymn in the style of Gabirol's Royal Crown, of which medical science constitutes the foundation. Azulai claims to have seen both of these writings in manuscript at the house of a rabbi in Constantinople.

Benveniste authored thousands of responsa, though a large portion of this collection was lost in a fire. The surviving responsa were later published in Hungary at the beginning of the 20th century.

== Works ==
He wrote the following works:

- Abodah Tammah (Perfect Service), a commentary on the service for the Day of Atonement (ib. 1719-20)
- Ozne Yehoshua (The Ears of Joshua), sermons for the Sabbath and special occasions (Constantinople, 1677)
- Sedeh Yehoshua (Fields of Joshua), a commentary on several tractates of the Talmud Yerushalmi (ib. 1662, 1749)
- Seder ha-Geṭ, on the formula for divorce, written at Brusa and published at Constantinople, 1719
- Sha'ar Yehoshua (Gate of Joshua), Benveniste's collection of responsa, seems to have been destroyed by fire; with several of his responsa are included in the collections of Moses Benveniste and Joseph Trani. However, a manuscript of the author was found in the early 20th century and published in 1904 (Hustin).

== Sources ==
Jewish Encyclopedia bibliography

- David Conforte, Ḳore ha-Dorot, 51a;
- Azulai, Shem ha-Gedolim, i.70.
