= Aaron Alfandari =

Talmudic writer

- Born: Aaron ben Moses Alfandari c. 1700; Smyrna
- Died: 1774 (aged 73–74); Hebron
- Occupation: Writer
- Relatives: Isaac Ardit
- Writing career
- Language: Hebrew
- Subject: Talmud

Aaron ben Moses Alfandari (c. 1700 – 1774 in Hebron) (Hebrew: אהרן אלפנדארי) was a Talmudic writer born in Smyrna. He emigrated to the Land of Israel (Ottoman Syria at the time) in his old age, where he met Chaim Yosef David Azulai, known as the CHIDA. In his book Shem HaGedolim, the CHIDA states he "got to meet the Rabbi in his old age in the holy city of Hebron, enjoying the radiance of his light..." Rabbi Alfandari was the first to sign the CHIDA's documents affirming him as an emissary to represent the Jewish community in foreign lands. The CHIDA lists him as one of the sages buried in the ancient Jewish cemetery in Hebron. Today, his name on the list is displayed on a plaque at the cemetery, although his exact grave site location was lost during the Jordanian period.

== Works ==
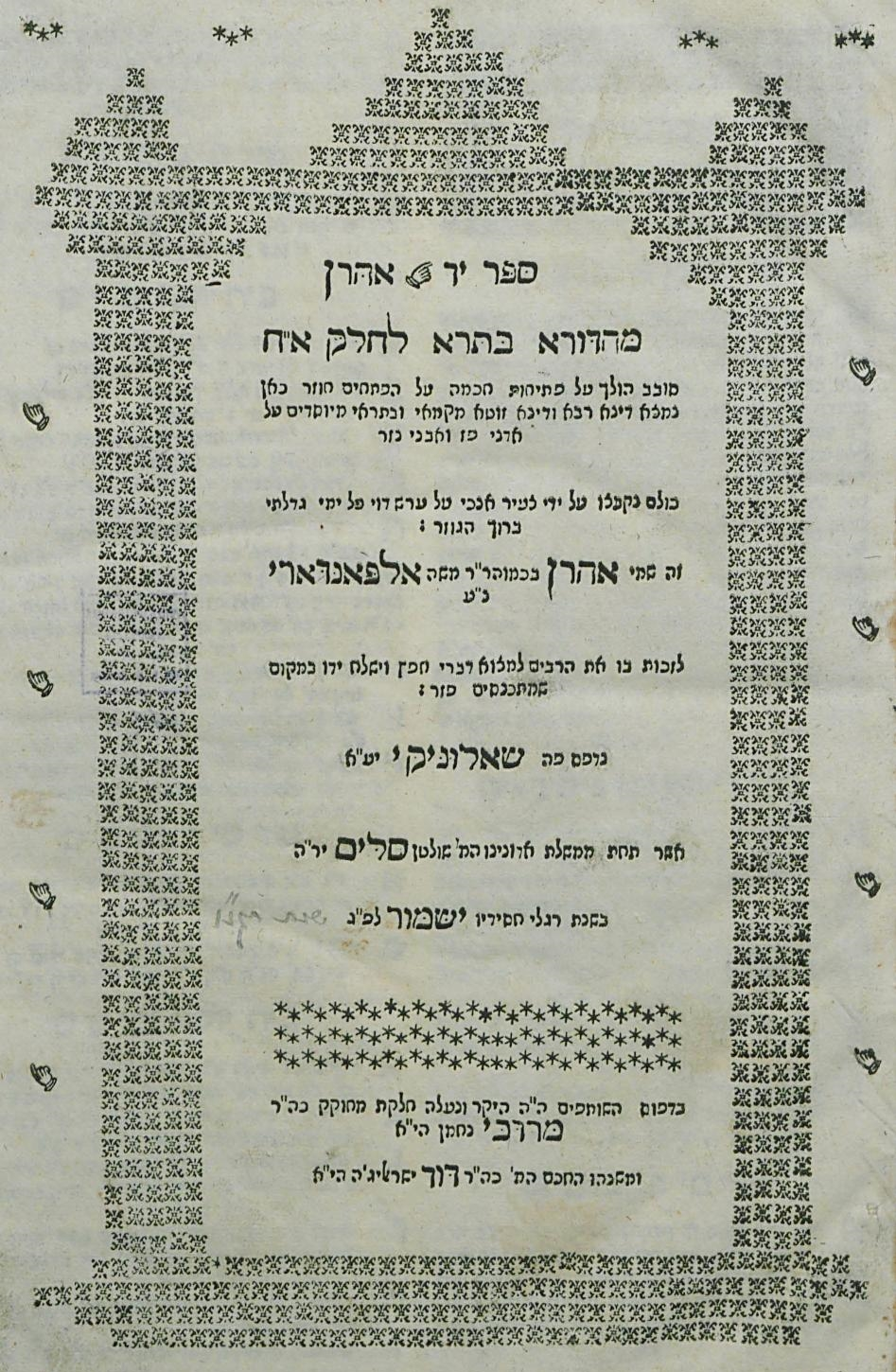
Title page of Sefer Yad Aharon, printed in 1791

He was the author of two works:

- Yad Aharon (Aaron's Hand), a collection of notes on Ṭur Oraḥ Ḥayyim (the first part of which was published in Smyrna in 1735, and the second in Salonica in 1791) and on Ṭur Eben ha-'Ezer (Smyrna, 1756–66)
- Mirkebet ha-Mishneh (The Second Chariot), a treatise on the first part of Maimonides' Yad ha-ḤazaḲah.

His grandson, Isaac Ardit, wrote a eulogy on him in his YeḲar ha-'Erek, Salonica, 1836.

== See also ==
- Alfandari
