= Isaac ben Moses Abulafia =

Rabbi (1824–1910)

Rabbi Isaac ben Moses Abulafia
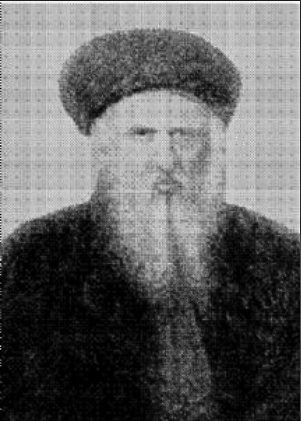
- Rabbi Isaac Abulafia

Personal life
- Born: Isaac ben Moses Abulafia; 1824 Tiberias, Ottoman Empire
- Died: 1910 (aged 85–86) Tiberias, Ottoman Empire
- Occupation: Rabbi, halakhist

Religious life
- Religion: Judaism
- Denomination: Sephardic Orthodox

Jewish leader
- Successor: Solomon Eliezer Alfandari
- Position: Chief Rabbi of Damascus
- Main work: Penei Yizhak

Isaac ben Moses Abulafia (1824-1910) was a rabbi and halakhist.

Abulafia, who was born in Tiberias, was rabbi of Damascus from c. 1877. His authoritarian attitude and his habit of making independent halakhic decisions roused the opposition of the other rabbis and of the communal leaders of Damascus, who united in an attempt to remove him from his position. In 1896 they turned to Moses ha-Levi, the Hakham Bashi, in Constantinople, who acceded to their request by appointing Solomon Eliezer Alfandari rabbi of Damascus. The two rabbis did not at first cooperate with each other. Later, however, Alfandari brought Abulafia into the sphere of his activities. Toward the end of his life Abulafia acted as rabbi in Tyre. From there he moved to Jerusalem, and finally to Tiberias, where he died. An outstanding halakhic scholar, his responsa Penei Yizhak were published in six volumes (1871-1906). Some scholars, especially Shalom Hai Gagin of Jerusalem, were critical of the first volume, and Abulafia wrote Lev Nishbar (1878) in reply to his critics.

== Links to published works ==
- Pene Yitzhaq vol. 1
- Pene Yitzhaq vol. 2
- Pene Yitzhaq vol. 3
- Pene Yitzhaq vol. 4
- Pene Yitzhaq vol. 5
- Pene Yitzhaq vol. 6
