= Chaim Elazar Spira =

Rebbe of the Hasidic Munkacs dynasty (1868–1937)

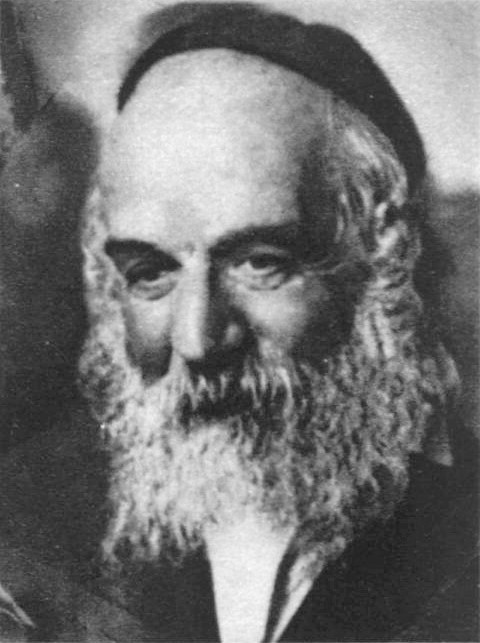
- Spira in 1937.
- Title: Munkacser Rebbe

Personal life
- Born: Chaim Elazar Spira; December 17, 1868 Strzyżów, Austria-Hungary
- Died: May 13, 1937 (aged 68) Mukachevo, Czechoslovakia
- Buried: Mukachevo, Czechoslovakia; May 13, 1937
- Spouse: Rochel Perl, daughter of Yakov Moshe Safrin of Komarno
- Children: Chaya Fruma ("Frima") Rifka Spira
- Parents: Tzvi Hirsch Spira of Munkacz (father); Esther, daughter of Chanina Horowitz of Ulanów (mother)
- Dynasty: Munkacz

Religious life
- Religion: Judaism

Jewish leader
- Predecessor: Tzvi Hirsch Spira
- Successor: Baruch Yehoshua Yerachmiel Rabinovich
- Began: 1913
- Ended: 1937
- Main work: Minchas Elozor
- Dynasty: Munkacz

Chaim Elazar Spira (December 17, 1868 – May 13, 1937), also known as the Minchas Elazar after his magnum opus, was a rebbe of the Hasidic Munkacs dynasty.

== Family background ==
Spira was born in Strzyżów, Kingdom of Galicia and Lodomeria, Austria-Hungary, now part of Poland, where his grandfather, Shlomo Spira, was a rabbi. Chaim Elazar's father, Tzvi Hersh Spira, was from Spira family which had held rabbinical positions in Munkács dating back to the founder of the Munkács Hasidic dynasty, Tzvi Elimelech Spira of Dinov (Bnei Yisoschor), who was Chief Rabbi from 1828 to 1832.

Spira became Chief Justice of the Rabbinical Court in Munkács in 1903, where he worked along with his father until the latter died in 1913. He succeeded his father as Chief Rabbi of Munkács and the surrounding communities.

== Biography ==
Spira wrote and published over twenty books on the Jewish law, Torah, Hasidism, and religious philosophy and customs including the six-volume Minchas Elazar. He opposed political Zionism and the Agudat Yisrael.

Spira established elementary schools under the name "Machzike Torah."

He founded a yeshiva (rabbinical college) in Munkacs, named Darchei Tshuva, after the title of his father's sefer (book).

== Journey to Jerusalem ==
The Minchas Elazar

In 1930, Spira visited Mandatory Palestine for a thirteen-day trip to visit the elderly kabbalist Solomon Eliezer Alfandari (known as the Saba Kadisha, "Holy Grandfather") and also to visit with his followers in Palestine.

He met with Alfandari for long hours behind closed doors over the span of a week. While Spira was in Jerusalem, Alfandari died.

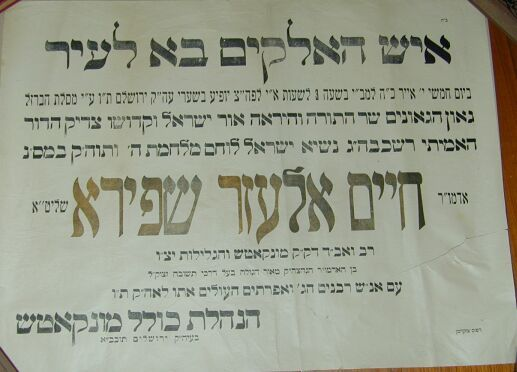
poster welcoming the holy minkatcher rabbi to Jerusalem

Details of the trip were recorded in a book written by a disciple of Spira's, Moshe Goldstein, who was one of those accompanying the Rebbe on his trip. The book was reprinted several times in Hebrew and Yiddish, and was translated to English in 2009 by Artscroll Publications.

== Wedding of daughter in 1933 ==
Spira's only daughter, Chaya Fruma Rivka (known as Frima), married Baruch Yehoshua Yerachmiel Rabinowicz in Munkács on March 15, 1933.

Over 20,000 guests attended the wedding. According to the daily newspaper Rudý večerník, "The wedding lasted for seven days."

== Legacy ==
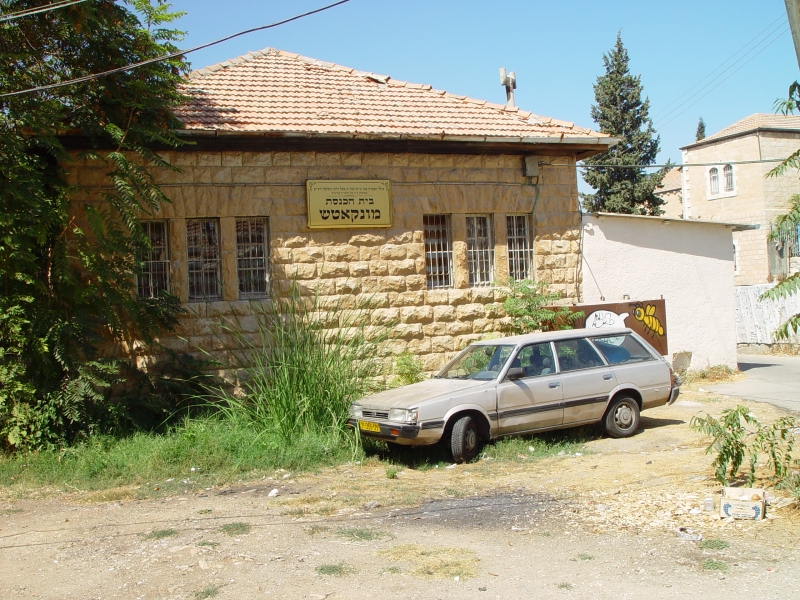
The side of the Batei Munkacs synagogue in Jerusalem. The entrance to the synagogue is on the right side of the building.

Spira's tombstone

Spira died in 1937 and was succeeded as Chief Rabbi by his son-in-law Baruch Yehoshua Yerachmiel Rabinowicz, Spira's only daughter Frima's husband, who was chief rabbi until the Nazi occupation of Munkács in 1944.

=== Successor ===
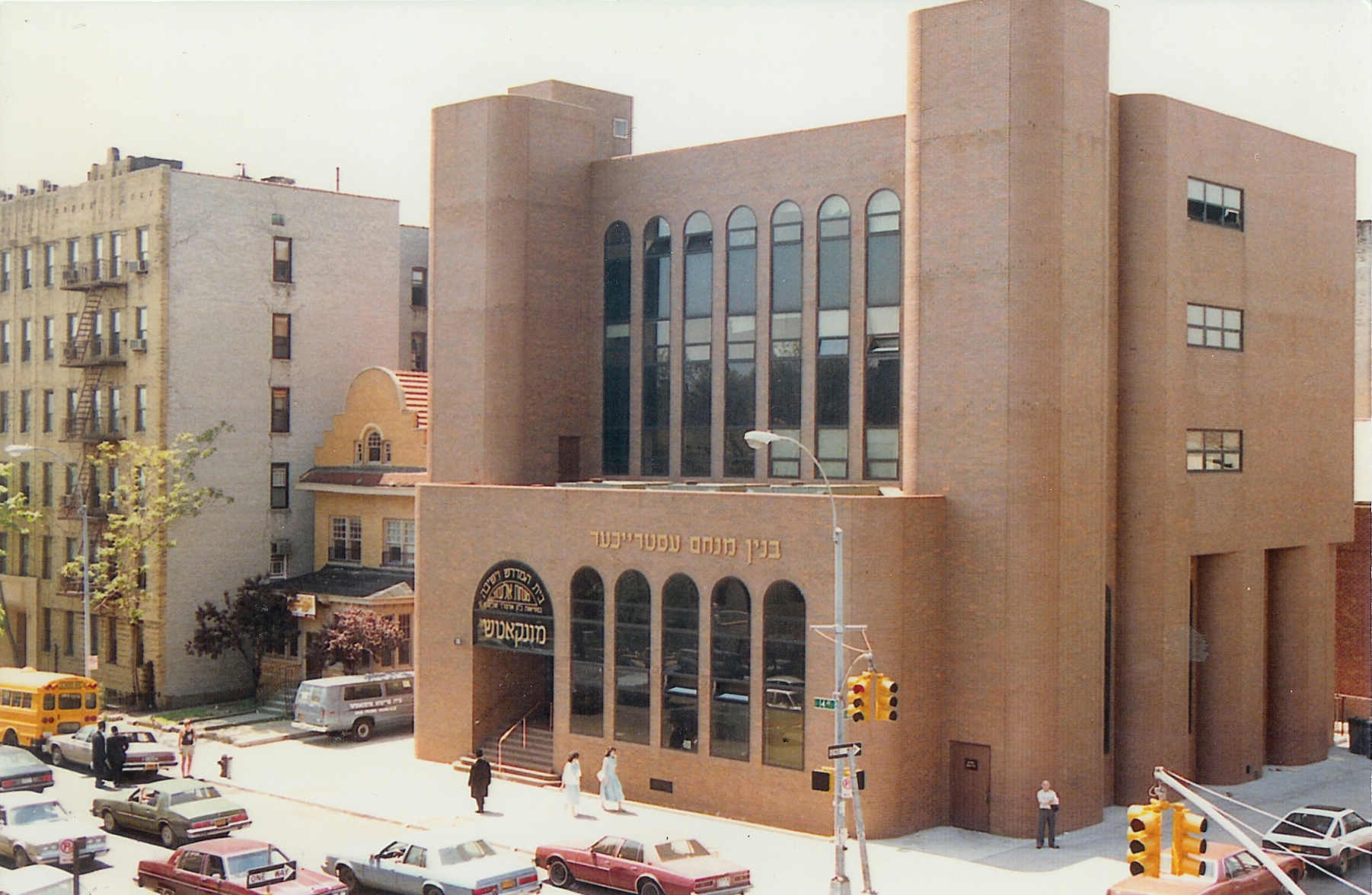
Munkacs World Headquarters (Boro Park, Brooklyn)

The Munkacs Hasidic dynasty is led by his grandson, Moshe Leib Rabinovich, who lives in Brooklyn.

==== Israel ====
Batei Munkacs, the Israeli residential neighborhood founded by Spira, draws tourists.
