= Jacob ben Hayyim Alfandari =

17th century rabbi in Istanbul

Jacob ben Ḥayyim Alfandari (1620 – 1695) was a talmudic writer and rabbi in Istanbul in the 17th century. In 1686, he refers to himself as an old man. He was the author of a volume of responsa edited by his nephew Ḥayyim the Younger (Istanbul, 1718), entitled Muẓẓal me-Esh (Plucked from the Fire), because it was saved from a conflagration which consumed most of the author's manuscripts. Others of his responsa are printed in the collection of his father and in that of Joseph Kazabi.

== See also ==
- Alfandari
