= Isaac Raphael Alfandari =

Isaac Raphael Alfandari (died ca. 1690), son of Ḥayyim, and father of Ḥayyim the Younger, lived in Constantinople in the 17th century. Some of his responsa are published in his father's collection, Maggid me-Reshit, Constantinople, 1710.

== Jewish Encyclopedia bibliography ==
- Isaac Benjacob, Oẓar ha-Sefarim, p. 291;
- Joseph Zedner, Cat. Hebr. Books Brit. Mus. s.v.

== See also ==
- Alfandari
