= David Lida =

Rabbi

David ben Aryeh Leib Lida (c. 1650 – 1696), chief Ashkenazi Rabbi of Amsterdam in the 1680's, formerly chief rabbi of Mayence (French for Mainz), wrote works of rabbinic literature, including Sefer Shomer Shabbat and books on the 613 Mitzvot, bris milah, the Shulchan Aruch, the Book of Ruth, and Jewish ethics (Divrei David, 1671).

He was accused of Sabbateanism and plagiarism, but was absolved of the former charges by the Council of the Four Lands. He died in Lviv.

== Biography ==
According to the Jewish Encyclopedia: "...his successor in Amsterdam was David Lida (formerly chief rabbi of Mayence), who came to Amsterdam in 1680. In the very first years of his rabbinate Lida engaged in a dispute with Nisan b. Judah Loeb, the brother-in-law of R. Wolf, then chief rabbi in Berlin, whose work he himself had published in Amsterdam. Lida left Amsterdam, but the Portuguese rabbinate interested itself in his behalf. Later he seems to have become suspected of Shabbethaism, and thus arrayed against himself not only the Ashkenazic authorities, but also the Portuguese. Then the "Wa'ad Arba' Araẓot" (Council of Four Lands) took up his cause, with the result that he made his peace with the Amsterdam congregation and returned there. He was appointed, with the approbation of the magistracy, as chief rabbi, for three years; but at the expiration of the term his contract was not renewed. He left Amsterdam, and went to Lemberg, where he died, 1696 (David Lida, "Beer 'Esek," 1684; responsa, "Ohel Ya'aḳob," Nos. 74-76; Jacob Emden's edition of the "Kiẓẓur Ẓiẓat Nobel Ẓebi," p. 59a, Altona, 1757; Buber, "Anshe Shem," p. 56). While he was in Amsterdam the notorious Eisenmenger visited him ("Entdecktes Judenthum," i. 843, Königsberg, 1711)."

"The inscription on his tombstone bears the date 5450 = 1690, but Polak (see "Ḳol Bat Gallim," p. 3) proves this to be a mistake, as several works are extant which were endorsed by him after the year given in the inscription. Stern (see "Bikkurim," i., Preface, p. xxxvi.) gives Ḥeshwan, 5448, which may, however, be a misprint for 5458 = 1698."

== Plagiarism ==
Having many other works to his credit, and apparently having made some enemies too, the charge of plagiarism is suspect. His work Migdal David was reputed to have been plagiarized from the Torat hesed of Hayyim ben Abraham ha-Kohen. While the Council of the Four Lands cleared him of several other charges that had been leveled against him, the charge of plagiarism remained a stain on his reputation.

Later scholars, such as Chaim Yosef David Azulai and Heimann Joseph Michael, considered the true author of Migdal David to have been Hayyim ha-Kohen.

== Works ==
- Be'er 'Eseḳ (The Well of Dispute), 1684
- Divre David, a moral treatise
- Ḥalluḳe Abanim (Smooth Stones), a commentary on Rashi to the Pentateuch (Fürth, 1693)
- Ir Miḳlaṭ (The City of Refuge), a commentary on the 613 commandments (Dyhernfurth, 1690)
- Migdal David (The Tower of David), a cabalistic commentary on Ruth (Amsterdam, 1680)
- Berit Adonai (The Alliance of God), a treatise in Judæo-German on circumcision (Amsterdam, 1684)
- Sod Adonai (The Secret of God), a treatise in Hebrew on circumcision, with a commentary entitled "Sharbiṭ ha-Zahab" (The Golden Scepter), written at Mainz in 1680, and published at Amsterdam 1694
- Ir Dawid (The Town of David), a collection of homilies, edited by his son Pethahiah (Amsterdam, 1719)
- Shir Hillulim (Wedding Song), a poem on the occasion of presenting a Sefer Torah scroll to the synagogue (Amsterdam, 1680)
- Yad kol bo, posthumous treatises published by his son Petahia (Frankfurt, 1727)

== Sources ==
- https://www.jewishencyclopedia.com/articles/1442-amsterdam#
- Encyclopaedia Judaica, V:1348
