= Baruch Yehoshua Yerachmiel Rabinowicz =

Hasidic Jewish rabbi

- ברוך יהושע ירחמיאל רבינוביץ
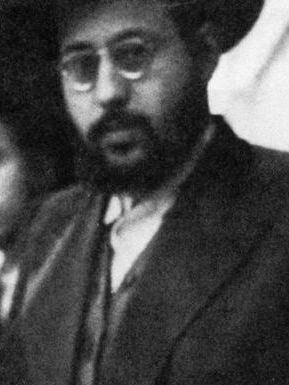
- Rabbi Baruch Rabinovich
- Title: Munkacser Rebbe

Personal life
- Born: Baruch Yehoshua Yerachmiel Rabinovich/wicz/wich [var.] September 25, 1914 Siedlce, Congress Poland, Russian Empire
- Died: December 26, 1997 (aged 83) Petah Tikva, Israel
- Buried: Petah Tikva, Israel
- Spouse: Chaya Frima Rivka daughter of Chaim Elazar Spira, Yehudis Wallhaus
- Children: Tzvi Nosson Dovid Rabinovich (dec.); Chaim Elazar Rabinovich (dec.); Moshe Leib Rabinovich; Yitzchok Yakov Rabinovich; Yita Wilamowsky, Rachel L'via Grossman (dec.); Meir Betzalel Yair Rabinovich
- Parents: Noson Dovid Rabinovich of Parczew (father); Yitta Spira of Stryzow (mother)
- Dynasty: Munkacs

Religious life
- Religion: Judaism

Jewish leader
- Predecessor: Chaim Elazar Spira
- Successor: Moshe Leib Rabinovich, Yizchok Yakov Rabinovich
- Began: 1937
- Ended: 1946
- Main work: Binas Nevonim
- Dynasty: Munkacs

Grand Rabbi Baruch Yehoshua Yerachmiel Rabinovich (Hebrew: ברוך יהושע ירחמיאל רבינוביץ; 1914–1997), was the Munkacser Rebbe.

== Early years ==
Boruch Yehoshua Yerachmiel was born in Congress Poland in 1914 to Rabbi Nosson Dovid Rabinovich (1868–1930), the Partzever rebbe, and Yitta Spira. His paternal grandfather was Rabbi Yitzchak Yaakov of Biala and his maternal grandfather was Rabbi Moshe Leib Spira of Stryzow (1850–1916), of the Munkacs dynasty. He was engaged to his intended bride at the age of 11. When he was 13, his father-in-law-to-be, Rabbi Chaim Elazar Spira of Munkacs, took him on a visit to the Holy Land.

== Marriage ==
In 1933 Rabinowicz married Frima Chaya Rivka, the only daughter of his mother's first cousin, Rabbi Chaim Elazar Spira, the Munkacser dynasty's rebbe, also known as the 'Minchas Elazar'. This set him on course to succeed his father-in-law as rabbi and rebbe of Munkacs. His wedding in 1933 was attended by 20–30,000 guests. Film of the wedding is on the web site of the United States Holocaust Memorial Museum, and is on display at the Museum of Jewish Heritage in New York City.

== Rabbi of Munkacs ==
After his father-in-law's death, Rabinowicz became rebbe of Munkacs in 1937. At the beginning of World War II, he was deported to Poland but released soon afterward. He then moved with his family to Budapest, where he obtained visas and escaped to Palestine, where his wife died in April 1945.

== Post-war ==
In 1946, Rabinowicz tried to become the Chief Rabbi of Tel Aviv, but withdrew from the race. In 1947, he moved to São Paulo, Brazil. He had become sympathetic to Zionism and the State of Israel, unlike his father-in-law. The Munkatcher chasidim who had survived the war conferred the title of Munkatcher rebbe upon his third son Moshe Leib Rabinovich, who lives in Brooklyn, during the father's lifetime.

Rabinowicz returned to Israel in 1963 to become Chief Rabbi of Holon. He later moved to Petah Tikva where he headed a small Beis Hamedrash until his death in 1997. His fourth son, Rabbi Yitzchok Yakov Rabinovich, is the rebbe of Dinov and also resides in Brooklyn.

In 1996, Rabinowicz published his works Divrei Nevonim and Binat Nevonim.

== See also ==
- Munkacs (Hasidic dynasty)
