= Batei Ungarin =

Haredi Jewish neighborhood in Jerusalem

Coordinates: 31.786533°N 35.22429°E

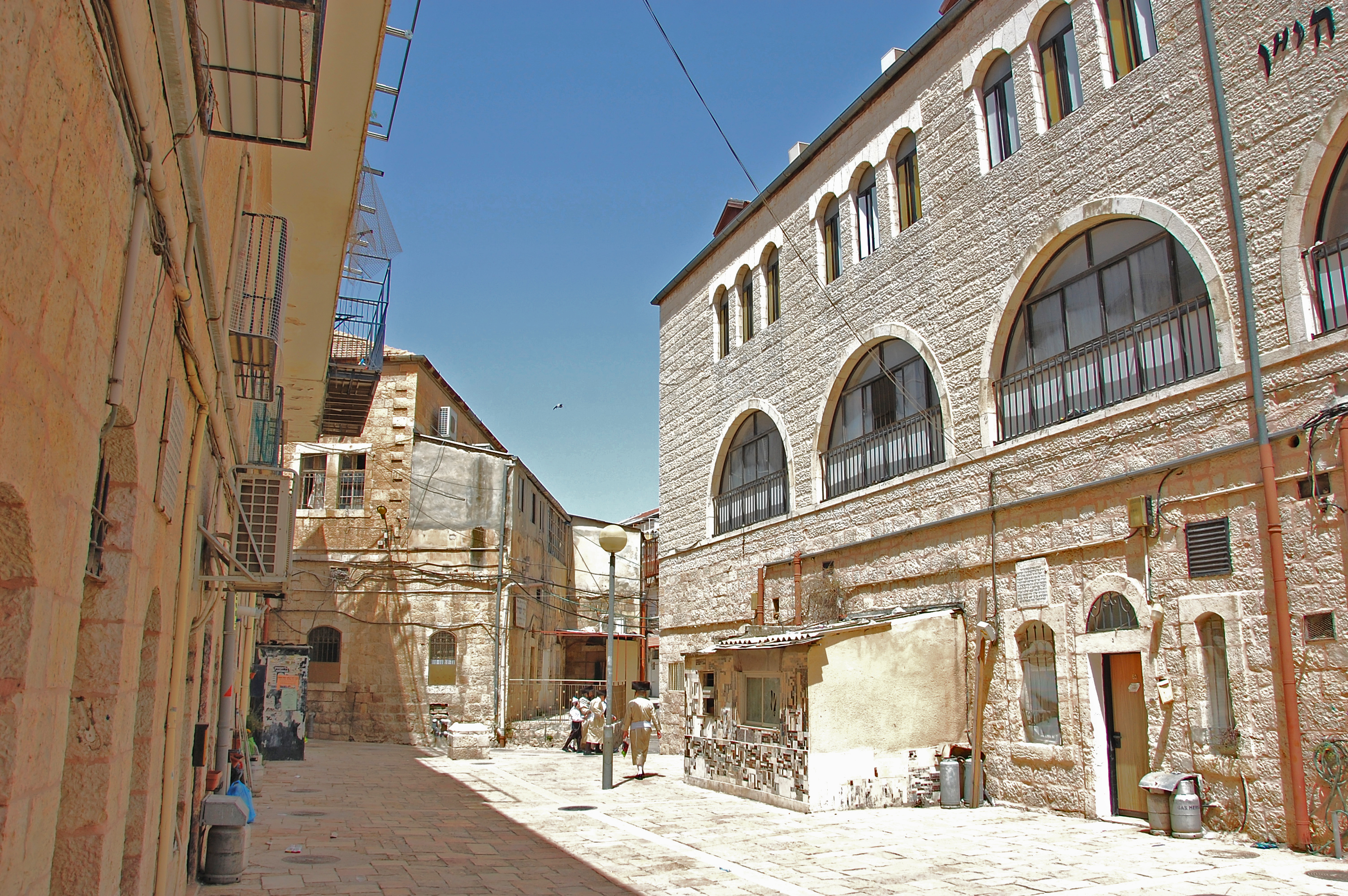
Batei Ungarin

Batei Ungarin (Hebrew: בתי אונגרין, lit. Hungarian Houses) is a Haredi Jewish neighborhood in Jerusalem, north-east of the Old City of Jerusalem. It was built by Kolel Ungarin, a Hungarian Jewish charity supporting Jews living in the Land of Israel.

== History ==
Batei Ungarin was established in 1891 by immigrant Hungarian Jews. By World War I, there were 100-200 homes (350 by 1948), a synagogue, a beit midrash, and a mikveh. The original inhabitants of the neighborhood came from Hungary, and many of the residents who live there today can trace their lineage to Hungary. A major Hasidic group called Toldos Aharon has its headquarters on the edge of Batei Ungarin.

In 2008, the neighborhood had one of the highest proportions of children up to age 15 in the country, accounting for 51% of its residents.

== See also ==
- Expansion of Jerusalem in the 19th century
