= Alfandari =

Family of eastern rabbis

Alfandari family
- Family
- Etymology: Possibly derived from the Spanish locality, Alfambra
- Members: Aaron ben Moses Alfandari; Elijah Alfandari; Ḥayyim ben Isaac Raphael Alfandari the Younger; Ḥayyim ben Jacob Alfandari the Elder; Isaac Raphael Alfandari; Jacob ben Ḥayyim Alfandari; Solomon Eliezer Alfandari; Solomon Alfandari (Valencia, 1367)
- Connected members: Moses Alphandéry (physician, 1506); Lyon Alphanderic (1558); Henri Alfandari (French MP, 2022)

Alfandari was a family of eastern rabbis prominent in the 17th and 18th centuries, found in Smyrna, Constantinople, and Jerusalem. The name may be derived from a Spanish locality, perhaps from Alfambra. The following is a list of the chief members of the family:

- Aaron ben Moses Alfandari
- Elijah Alfandari
- Ḥayyim ben Isaac Raphael Alfandari the Younger
- Ḥayyim ben Jacob Alfandari the Elder
- Isaac Raphael Alfandari
- Jacob ben Ḥayyim Alfandari
- Solomon Eliezer Alfandari

Members of this family were to be found as of 1906 in Constantinople and in Beirut. A Portuguese family of the name Alphandéry still exists, as of 1906, in Paris and Avignon. In Avignon there was a physician, Moses Alphandéry, in 1506, and a Lyon Alphanderic, in 1558. Compare the names Moses אלפנדריך and Aaron אלפנדארק.

In addition to the persons mentioned above, there is known a Solomon Alfandari (Valencia, 1367), whose son Jacob assisted Samuel Ẓarẓa in tranṣlating the Sefer ha-'Aẓamim of pseudo-ibn Ezra from Arabic into Hebrew. A merchant, Isaac Alfandari, was wrecked in 1529 on the Nubian coast. In Israeli popular culture, the principal family in the 1973 film Daughters, Daughters is named Alfandari.

For a possible explanation of the name, see Steinschneider.

Henri Alfandari has been a French Member of Parliament since 2022.

== See also ==
- Edmond Alphandéry (b. 1943), French politician
- Alphandéry (name), several people with this name
