= Chaim Benveniste =

Ottoman rabbi

Cover of Kenesset HaGedolah

Chaim Benveniste (1603–1673) was a prominent rabbinic authority in 17th century Turkey. He was a student of Rabbi Joseph Trani and a brother of Joshua Benveniste. Born in Constantinople, he was appointed Rabbi of Tita (a town near İzmir) in 1644. In 1658, he was appointed one of the rabbis of İzmir. He initially followed Shabtai Tzvi, but later repented.

== Writings ==
He authored several scholarly works, most notably the widely cited Shiyurei Kenesset HaGedolah and Kenesset HaGedolah, halakhic commentaries to the Arba'ah Turim and Shulhan Arukh. These two commentaries are characterized by extensive analysis of halakhic sources from the mid-16th century to the mid-17th century. The Chida recommended that these commentaries be consulted prior to rendering any halakhic decision.

He also compiled the two volume Questions and Responsa, Ba'ei Chayei, covering the four sections on the Shulhan Arukh.
