= Aaron ben Isaac Sason =

Ottoman author and Talmudist, born 1629

Aaron ben Isaac Sason was an Ottoman author and Talmudist; born in Constantinople in 1629. He was a grandson of Aaron ben Joseph Sason, an eminent Talmudist, and cousin of Ḥayyim Benveniste, the famous scholar. Aaron Cupino, rabbi of Constantinople, was his teacher in Talmudic lore, and was so successful that at the age of twenty his pupil engaged in Talmudic controversies with Moses Benveniste, who thought them worthy of publication. A Constantinople commentator Judah Rosanes referred with respect to an unpublished work, "Hen Yeshallaḥ," by R. Aaron. Whether the work "Sefat Emet" should be credited to R. Aaron or to his grandfather, Aaron ben Joseph, is uncertain. The latter is more probably its author. Shabbethai Bass, the only writer who mentions that particular book, in his "Sifte Yeshenim," throws no light on this question, merely mentioning that it is by Aaron Sason.
