= Rudý večerník =

Communist newspaper published from Czechoslovakia

- Editor-in-chief: Ivan Olbracht
- Political alignment: Communist Party of Czechoslovakia
- Headquarters: Prague
- Country: Czechoslovakia
- Circulation: 100,000 (as of 1938)
- Sister newspapers: Rudé právo

Rudý večerník ('Red Evening Newspaper') was a communist evening newspaper published from Prague, interbellum Czechoslovakia. As of 1938 the paper was estimated to have a circulation of 100,000. It was the evening edition of the central party organ Rudé právo. The newspaper was initially known as Rudé právo Večerník ('Red Justice - Evening'), the name Rudý večerník was adopted on 1 April 1928. Ivan Olbracht served as editor-in-chief of Rudý večerník.
