= Moshe Leib Rabinovich =

Hasidic rabbi

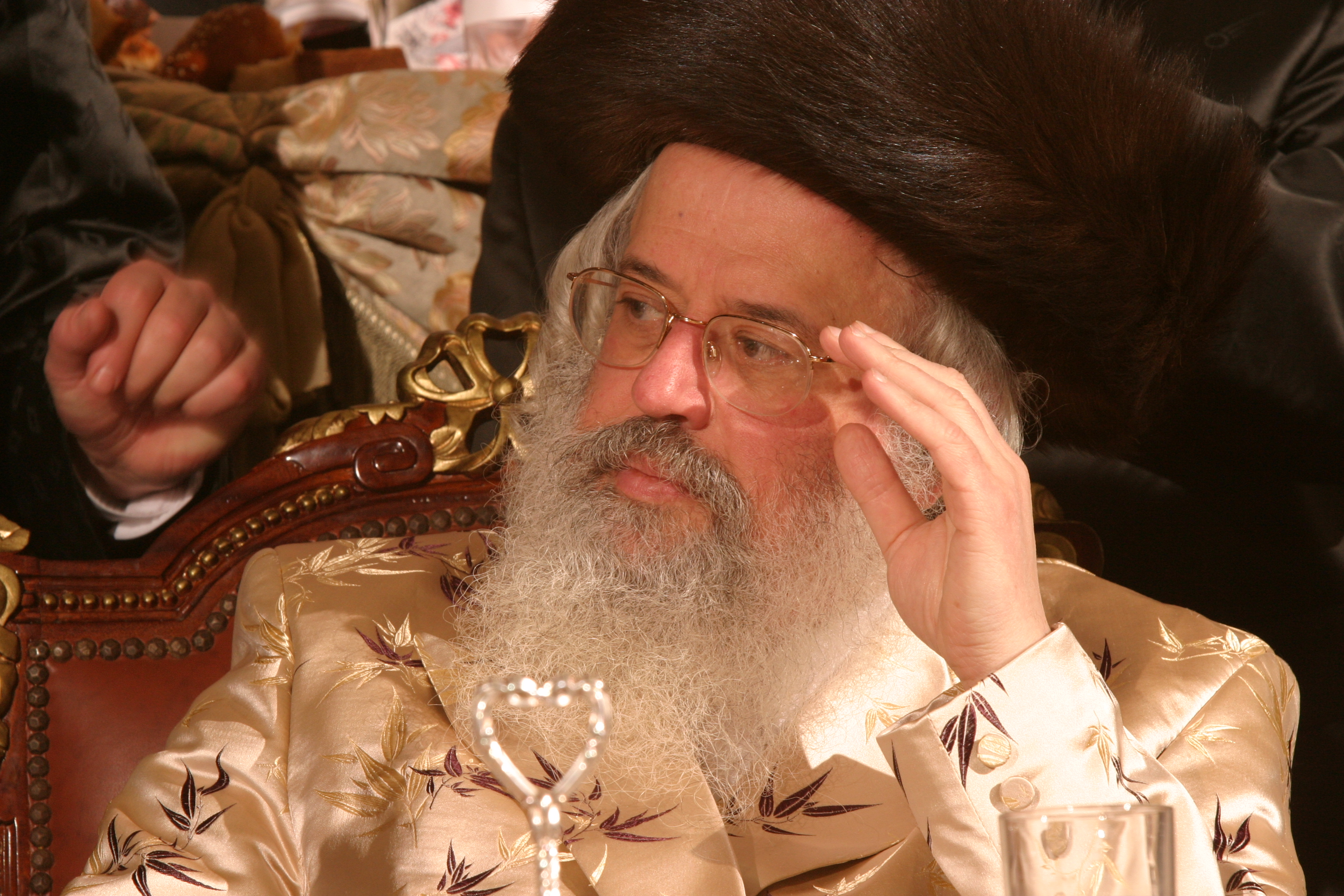
- Title: Munkacser Rebbe

Personal life
- Born: Moshe Yehuda Leib Rabinovich; December 25, 1940 (age 85) Munkács, Hungary (now Mukachevo, Ukraine)
- Spouse: Nechama Perl daughter of Rabbi Aron Bernstein of Jerusalem
- Parents: Baruch Yehoshua Yerachmiel Rabinovich (father); Chaya Frima Rivka (daughter of Rabbi Chaim Elazar Spira of Munkacs) (mother)
- Dynasty: Munkacs

Religious life
- Religion: Judaism

Jewish leader
- Predecessor: Baruch Yehoshua Yerachmiel Rabinovich
- Began: 1961
- Ended: present
- Dynasty: Munkacs

Rabinovich in 2009

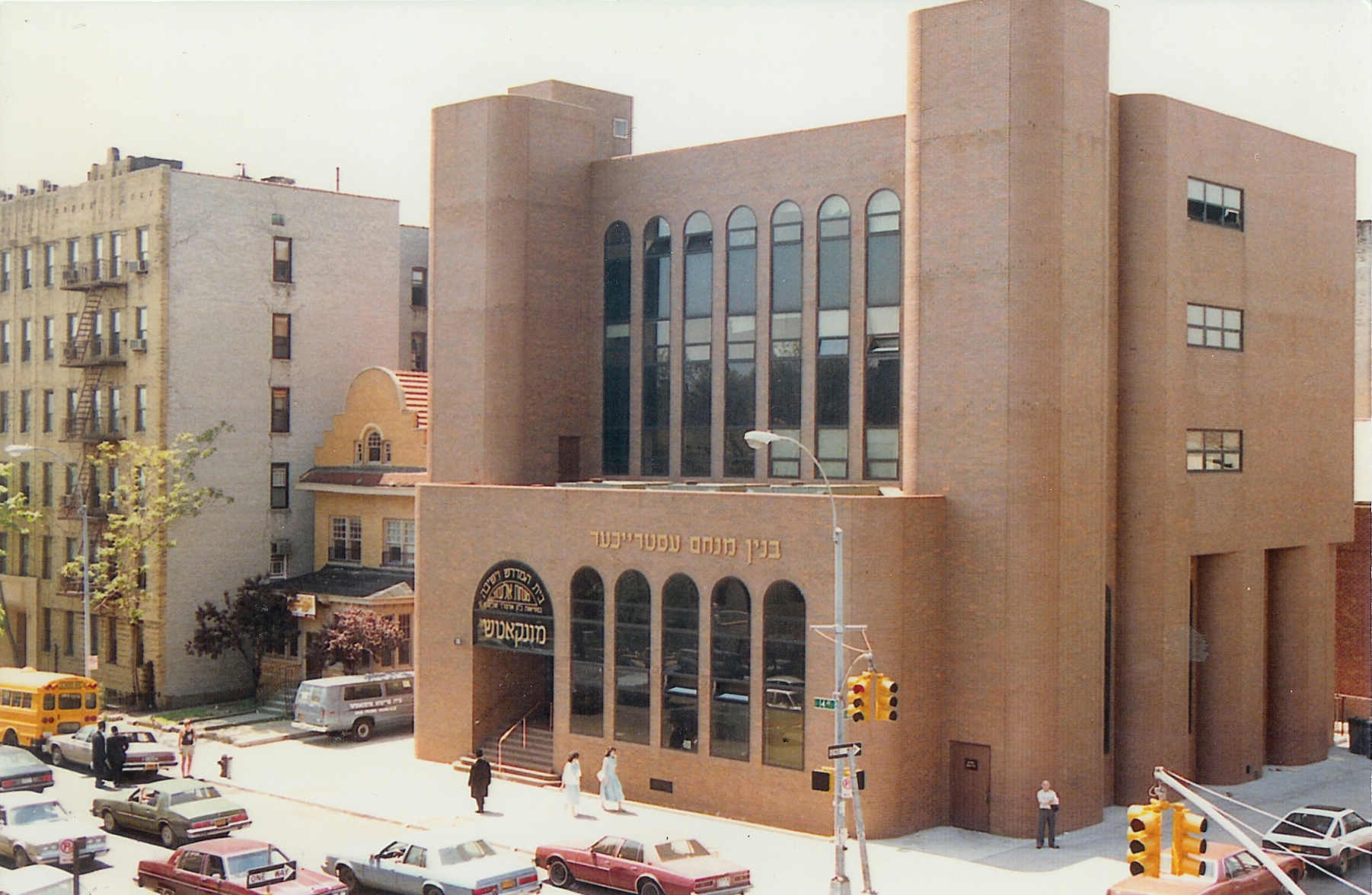
Munkacs World Headquarters in Boro Park, Brooklyn

Moshe Leib Rabinovich (born December 25, 1940, in Munkács, Hungary) is the current rebbe of Munkacs.

== Early life ==
Rabinovich was born as the third child to his parents Rabbi Baruch and Frima Rabinovich in Munkács, Carpathian Ruthenia, the country itself having at the time just been created with a sizable piece of Hungary, which in turn received Munkacs from Czechoslovakia with the help of Nazi Germany in 1938.

His father, Rabbi Baruch Yehoshua Yerachmiel Rabinowicz served as Chief Rabbi of Munkacs following the death of his father-in-law Chief Rabbi Chaim Elazar Spira in 1937 until the Nazis occupied Munkacs in 1944.

During World War Two, Rabinovich's father escaped the Nazis and fled with his entire family to the land of Israel (then Mandatory Palestine). Shortly after they arrived in Mandatory Palestine, Rabinovich and his siblings were orphaned with the death of their mother, Chaya Frima Rivka Rabinovich. Rabinovich studied in Israel, undertook secular studies in public schools in São Paulo, Brazil, and later studied in the United States at the Telshe yeshiva in Cleveland, Ohio, refusing to attend college, to his father’s disappointment. At Telshe, he became especially close to Rabbi Mordechai Gifter with whom he had a study partnership of several consecutive hours on a daily basis and from Rav Gifter he acquired his derech halimud. Following five years at Telshe, Rabinovich moved to Beis Medrash Elyon, a yeshiva for advanced learning in Spring Valley, New York. He also maintained a close relationship with the Satmar Rebbe Rabbi Joel Teitelbaum until his death in 1979.

While Rabinovich was in Beis Medrosh Elyon, the elders of Munkacs met in Brooklyn. Led by Rabbi Chaim Ber Greenfeld and Rabbi Shlomo Goldstein, both gabbai's (secretaries) of the Munkacser Rebbe, Rabbi Chaim Elazar Spira, the participants agreed unanimously that the time had come for Munkacs Hasidism to be born again, in America, and that Rabinovich should be their Rebbe.

== As Rebbe ==
Rabinovich married Nechama Perl, daughter of Rabbi Aron Bernstein of Jerusalem in 1962 and was immediately appointed as leader of the Munkacs community. At first, he settled in the Williamsburg section of Brooklyn, New York and later moved to the Boro Park section of Brooklyn. He immediately began to rebuild the community and established religious and educational bases in the United States, Canada, Israel, England and Australia.

Rabinovich's followers and petitioners seek his advice on all issues. His counsel is frequently sought by government and elected officials for his blessings and support.

Rabinovich frequently visits his home town in Munkacs (now, Mukachevo, Ukraine), to strengthen the remaining Jews and to help rebuild the Munkacs Jewish community. In August 2006, a Jewish community center and Synagogue were dedicated by Rabbi Rabinovich to serve the needs of the community.

Rabinovich has authored numerous books on Torah and Halacha (Jewish Law), among them Sharei Orah and Olas Shabbos. He also serves as honorary president of Kollel Munkatch and Ten Suburbs in Jerusalem, Israel.

== Personal life ==
He resides in Borough Park, Brooklyn, New York, which is home to thousands of Jews of Munkacs descent and which is the international headquarters of worldwide Munkacs Jewry.

Rabinovich and his wife have three children: Rabbi Chaim Elazar, married to Gittel Beila Teitlebaum; Frima, married to Rabbi Yosef Horowitz; and Rabbi Yerucham Fishel, married to Malka Teitelbaum.

== Related reading ==
- Jewish Press "My Machberes" article regarding the Munkacser Rebbe
- Geist, William E. (June 10, 1987). "About New York; Culinary D-Day: Caterer Marshals a Nosh for 20,000". The New York Times.
- Jewish Press "My Machberes" article describing the Munkacs sukkah
- Mishpacha magazine article on the Munkacser Rebbe
- Herman Wouk book on the Munkacser Rebbe
