= Ramat Aharon =

Coordinates: 32.0857°N 34.8421°E

Ramat Aharon רׇמַת אַהֲרֹן
- Neighbourhood
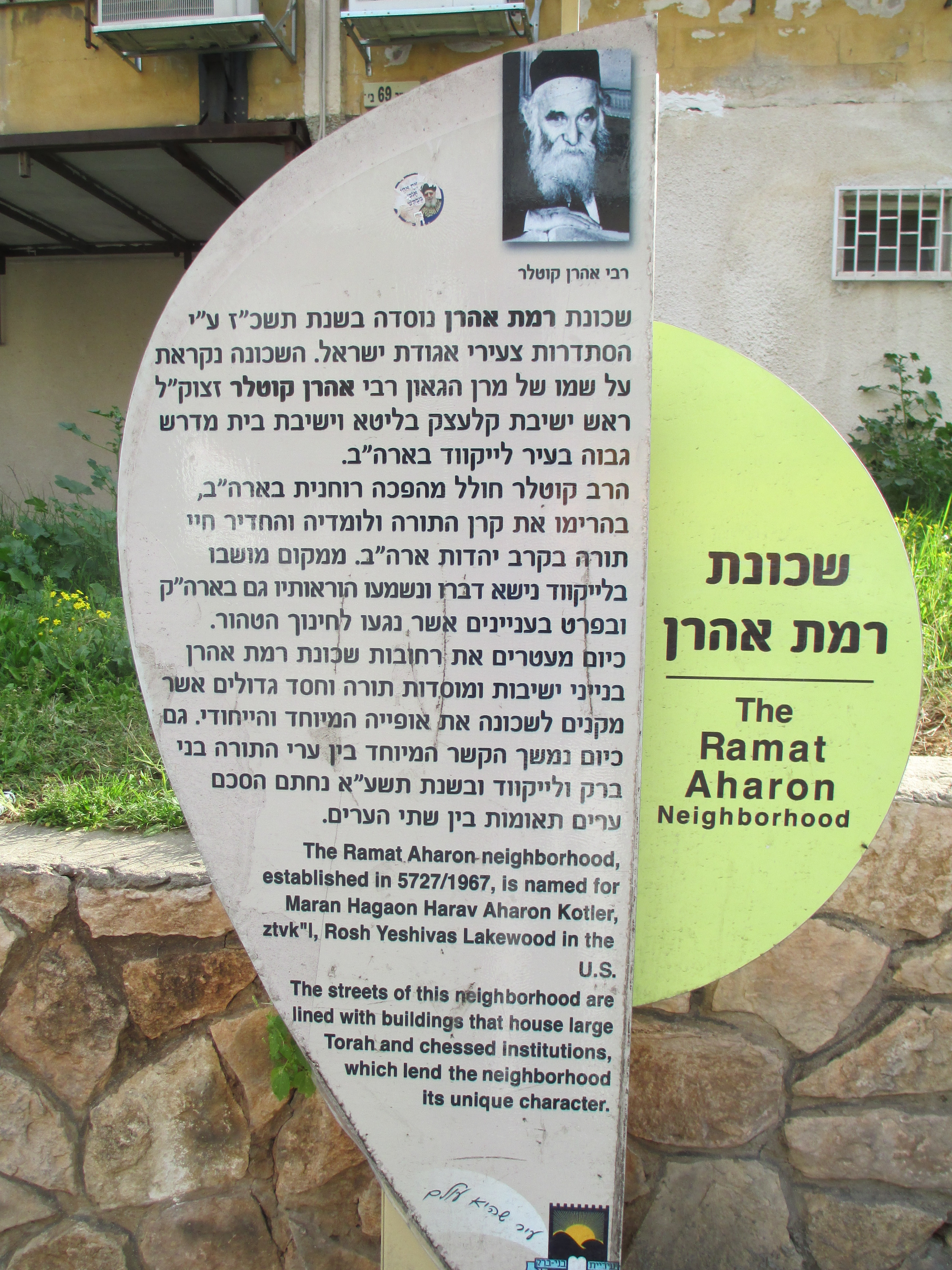
- Memorial plaque to Rabbi Aharon Kotler in Ramat Aharon
- Interactive map of Ramat Aharon
- Country: Israel
- City: Bnei Brak

Ramat Aharon (Hebrew: רׇמַת אַהֲרֹן) is a neighbourhood in the eastern part of Bnei Brak, Israel.

The neighbourhood was established in 1967 and was named after Rabbi Aharon Kotler.

The streets of the neighbourhood are lined with buildings that house large institutions of Torah and chesed, which give the neighbourhood its unique character.

The Av Beit Din of Ramat Aharon is Rabbi Nissim Karelitz.

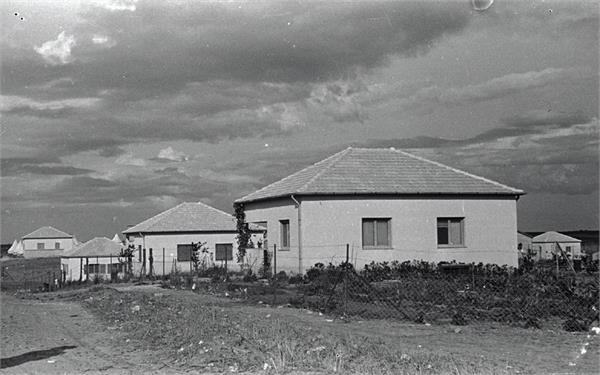
Ramot Aharon 1936
