= Joseph Trani =

Ottoman Jewish rabbi and talmudist (1568–1639)

Joseph Trani (1568–1639) or Joseph di Trani was a Talmudist of the latter part of the 16th century who lived in Greece. By contemporary scholars he was called Mahrimat (Hebrew: מהרימ"ט), and regarded as one of the foremost Talmudists of his time. Today he is more widely known as Maharit (Hebrew: מהרי"ט). He is the son of the Mabit.

He was the author of She'elot u-Teshubot (responsa), a work in three parts: part i comprises 152 responsa, together with a general index (Constantinople, 1641); part ii consists of 111 responsa in the order of the first three parts of the ritual codex (Venice, 1645); part iii contains responsa to the fourth part of the ritual codex, together with novellæ to the tractate Ḳiddushin, and supercommentaries on RaN's and Alfasi's commentaries on the tractates Ketubot and Ḳiddushin (ib. 1645). The entire work appeared in Fürth in 1764. Joseph also published novellæ to the treatises Shabbat, Ketubot, and Kiddushin (Sudzilkov, 1802), and the responsa which were embodied in Alfandari's Maggid me-Reshit (Constantinople, 1710). He left several commentaries in manuscript on Alfasi, on Maimonides' Yad ha-Chazaka, and on R. Nathan's Aruk.

In 2008, Trani's burial site was discovered in Safed Old Jewish Cemetery, near the grave of Rabbi Moshe Alshich. Although the Maharit died and was buried in Constantinople, his sons later transferred his remains to Safed as he had requested so that he could be interred near his father, Moshe di Trani.
