= Hayyim ben Menahem Algazi =

17th-century rabbi and author

Rabbi Hayyim ben Menahem Algazi
- חיים בן מנחם אלגאזי
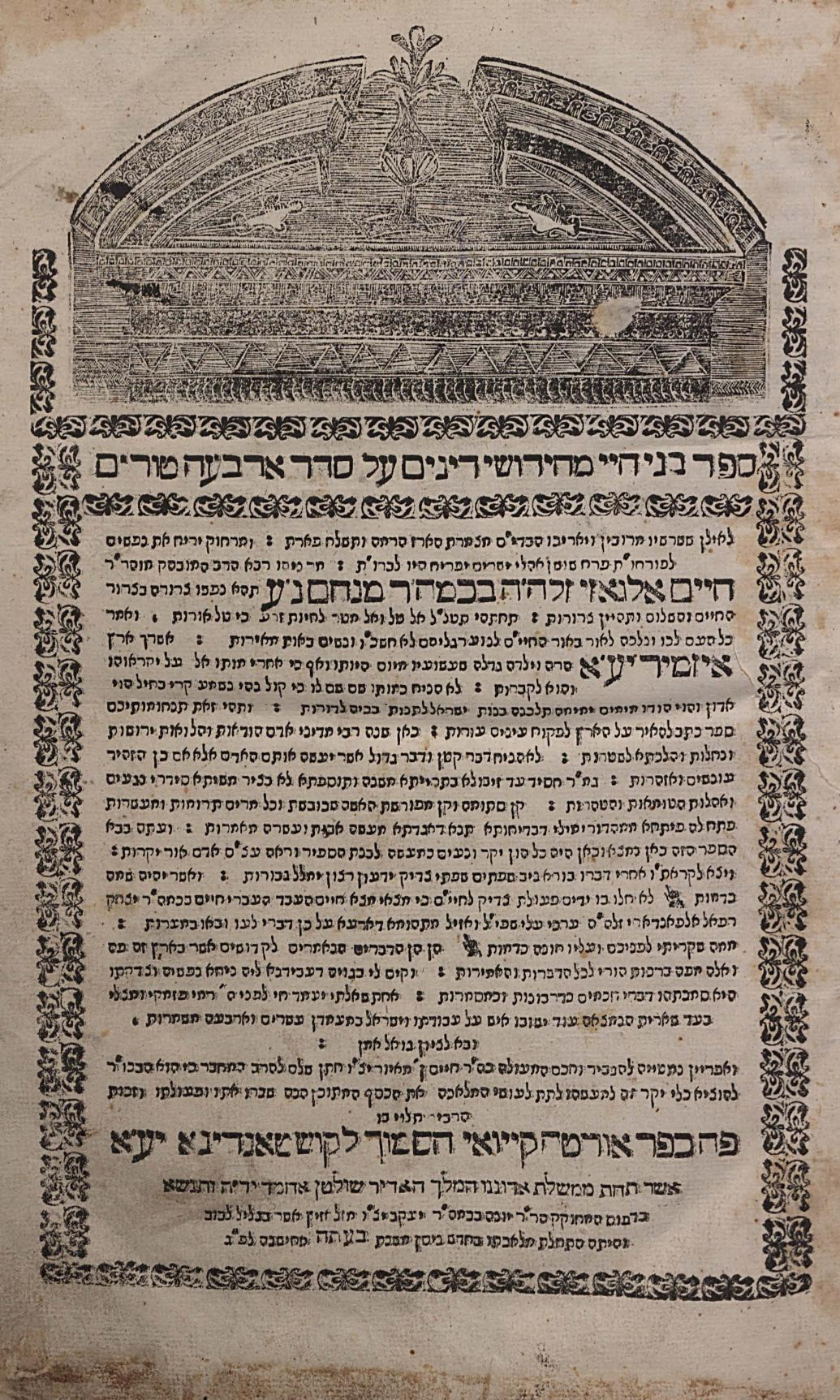
- Title page of "Bene Ḥayyai"

Personal life
- Parent: Menahem Algazi (father)
- Occupation: rabbi

Religious life
- Religion: Judaism

Hayyim ben Menahem Algazi (Hebrew: חיים בן מנחם אלגאזי) was the rabbi of the island of Rhodes and Smyrna and author of "Bene Ḥayyai". He lived in the seventeenth century.

== Bene Ḥayyai ==
Algazi authored "Bene Ḥayyai" (Sons of My Life), containing notes and novellæ in the sequence of the Arba'ah Turim. It was edited by the author's pupil, Meir Danon, and published at Orthokoi (near Constantinople) in 1712. Appended to it are the author's "Chiddushim," miscellaneous notes on Shevu'ot, Sanhedrin, Gittin, etc., edited by Hayyim ben Isaac Raphael Alfandari.
