= Yom Tov Algazi =

18th century Ottoman rabbi

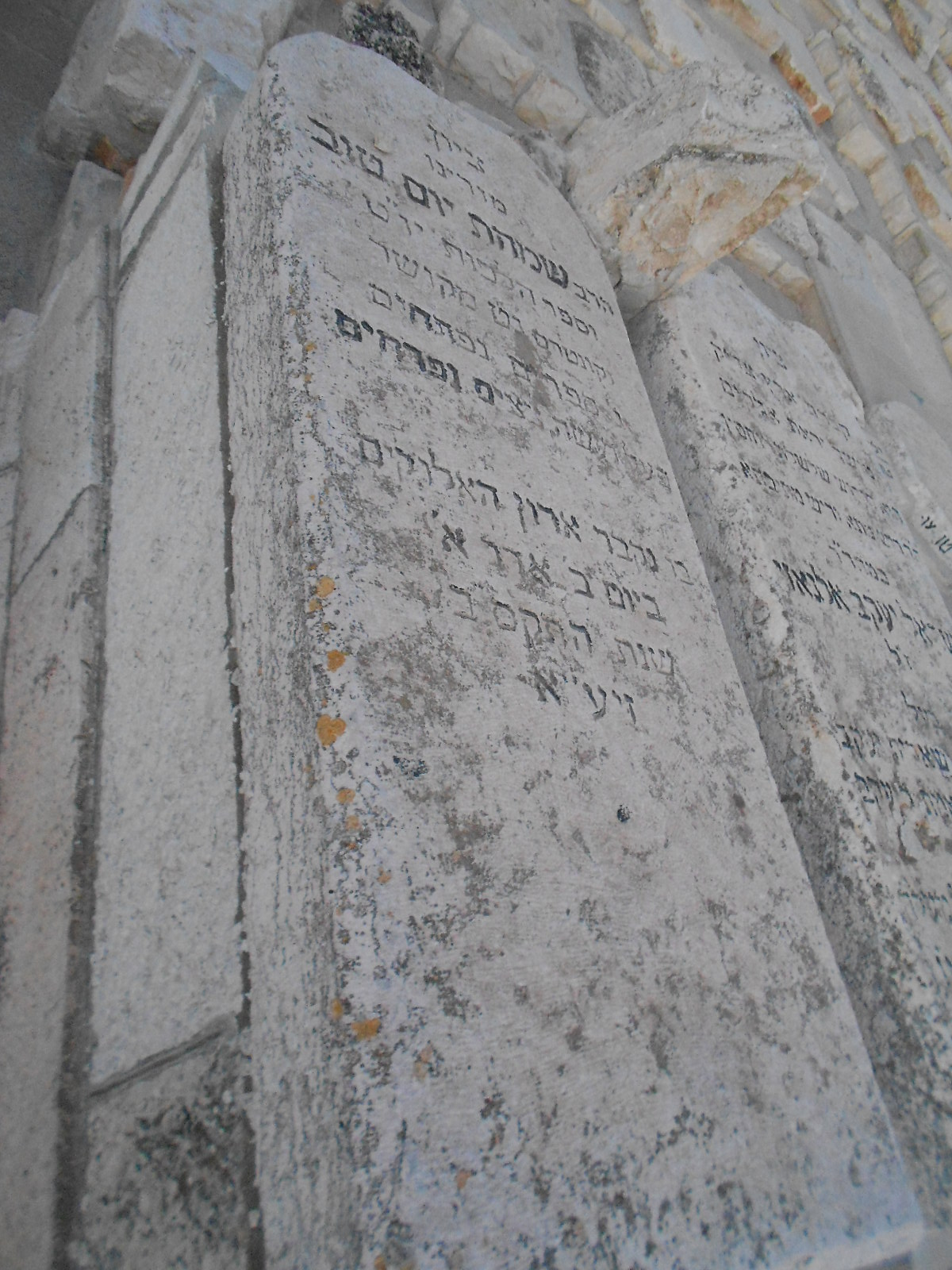
Grave of Rabbi Algazi on Olive Mt.

Yom Tov Algazi (Hebrew: יום-טוב אלגאזי; known as the Maharit Algazi; 1727, Izmir – 1782, Jerusalem), the son of Israel Yaakov Algazi, was an Ottoman rabbi who studied under Rabbi Shalom Sharabi and authored major halakhic works. He succeeded Sharabi as head of Beit El and served as Chief Rabbi of Jerusalem and the rest of the country from 1773, after his father-in-law Raphael Moshe Bula died shortly after being appointed in 1772, until his death in 1782.

He often traveled to Europe to solicit funds for the Jerusalem community and was warmly welcomed by Hungarian rabbis Moses Sofer and Akiva Eiger. He visited Bordeaux, France.

When rumors spread that the Jews of Jerusalem were planning to aid Napoleon's conquest of the city, Algazi publicly declared loyalty to the Turks and gathered the community to offer prayers for an Ottoman victory at the Wailing Wall. Together with Rabbi Mordechai Meyuchas, Algazi organised a Jewish contingent to reinforce the city's defenses.

The names of his published works are: Shemot Yom Tov and Hilkhot Yom Tov (1794), Kedushat Yom Tov (1843).
