= Aaron ben Joseph Sason =

Ottoman Talmudic author

Aaron ben Joseph Sason was an Ottoman Talmudic author; born toward the middle of the sixteenth century, probably at Salonica, where he received his rabbinical education under the supervision of Mordecai Matalon, an eminent scholar. During the last decades of the sixteenth century Aaron ben Joseph engaged in teaching, and some of his pupils ranked among the eminent rabbis of Turkey. With these, as well as with his colleagues, he maintained a lively correspondence on Talmudic questions, the summary of which (232 responsa) was published at Venice in 1625 under the title "Torat Emet" (Law of Truth). In the introduction to this work he mentions his commentaries on "Yad ha-Ḥazaḳah" of Maimonides and on the "Ṭur" of Jacob ben Asher, as well as his treatises on various halakic subjects, which do not appear to have been published, and which are perhaps altogether lost. It seems probable that the work "Sefat Emet" (Lip of Truth), which, according to the testimony of Shabbethai, Bass, contains scholia to the Talmud and to the Tosafot, was written by Aaron ben Joseph and not by his grandson, Aaron ben Isaac Sason. This probability is supported to some extent by the title, "Sefat Emet," which corresponds with the title of his collection of responsa, as well as by the above cited statement in his introduction to "Torat Emet," that he had written scholia to the Talmud.
