= Munkacs (Hasidic dynasty) =

Hungarian Hasidic dynasty

Munkacs Hasidic Dynasty
Total population
- 2,500 families

Founder
- Shlomo Spira

Regions with significant populations
- Israel, United States, Canada, England, Europe, Australia
- Israel: 10,000–15,000
- United States: 15,000
- Western Europe: 8,000

Religions
- Hasidic Judaism

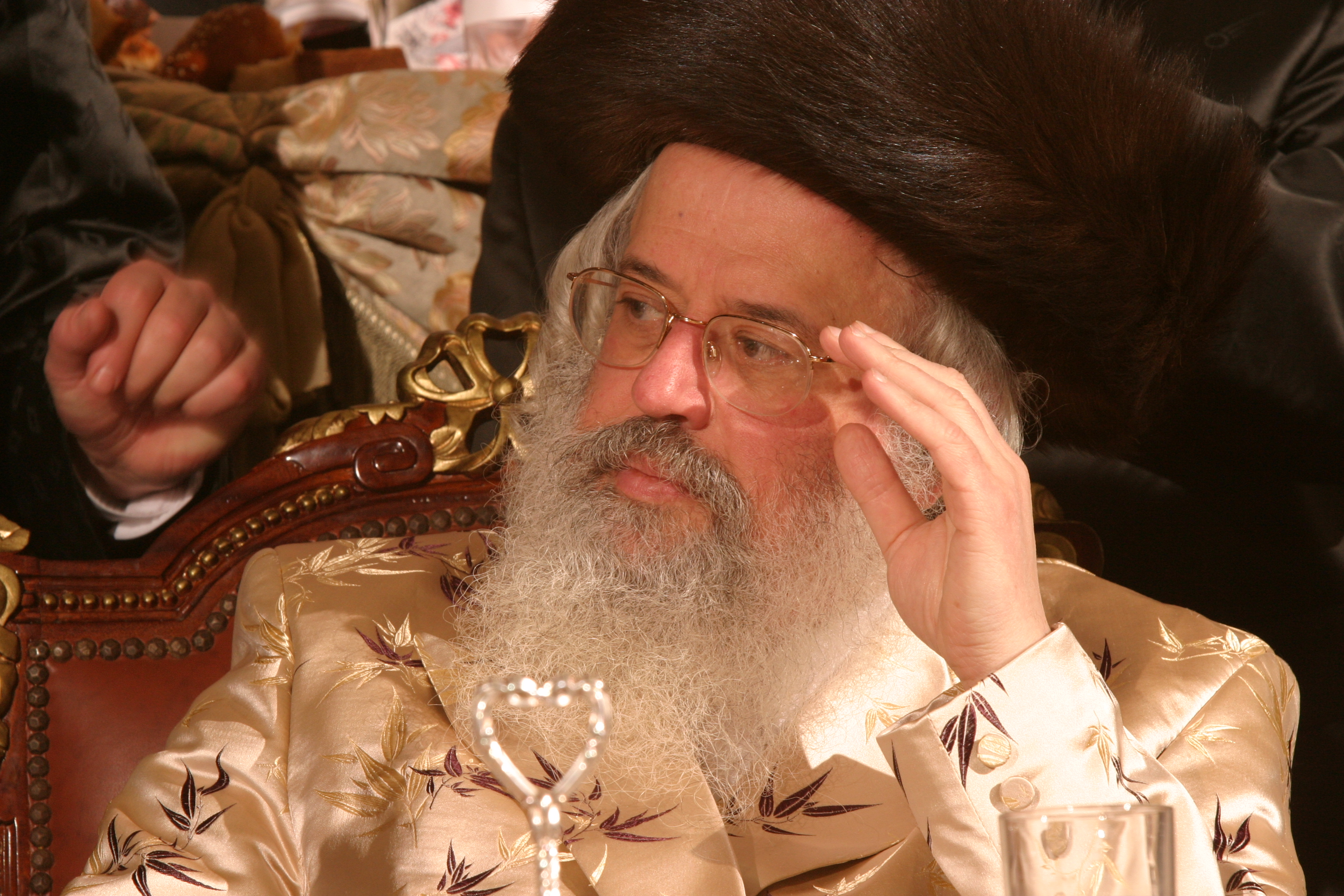
Grand Rabbi Moshe Leib Rabinovich, current Munkacser Rebbe

Munkacs (or Munkatsh; Hebrew: חסידות מונקאַטש) is a Hasidic sect within Haredi Judaism, comprising mostly Hungarian Hasidic Jews. It was founded by Polish-born Grand Rebbe Shlomo Spira, the rabbi of the town of Strzyżów (1858–1882) and Munkács (1882–1893). Members of the congregation are mainly referred to as Munkacs Hasidim, or Munkatsher Hasidim. The sect is named after the then Hungarian town in which it was established, Munkatsh (in Yiddish; or in Hungarian: Munkács; today: Mukachevo, in Ukraine).

The largest communities of Munkacs are in New York, namely Borough Park and Williamsburg, Brooklyn, New York, and Monsey, New York. Other, smaller communities can be found across North America, Europe, Israel, and Australia.

== Lineage of the Munkacs Chasidic Dynasty ==
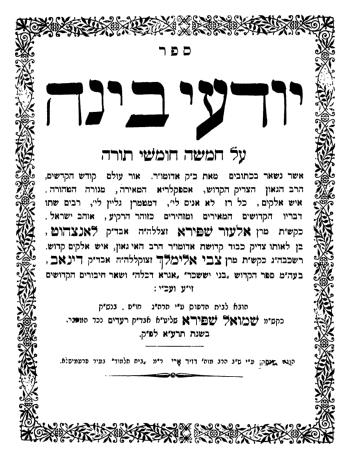
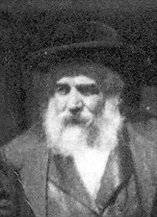
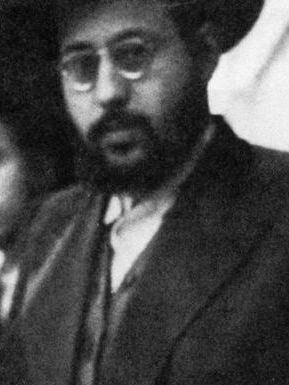
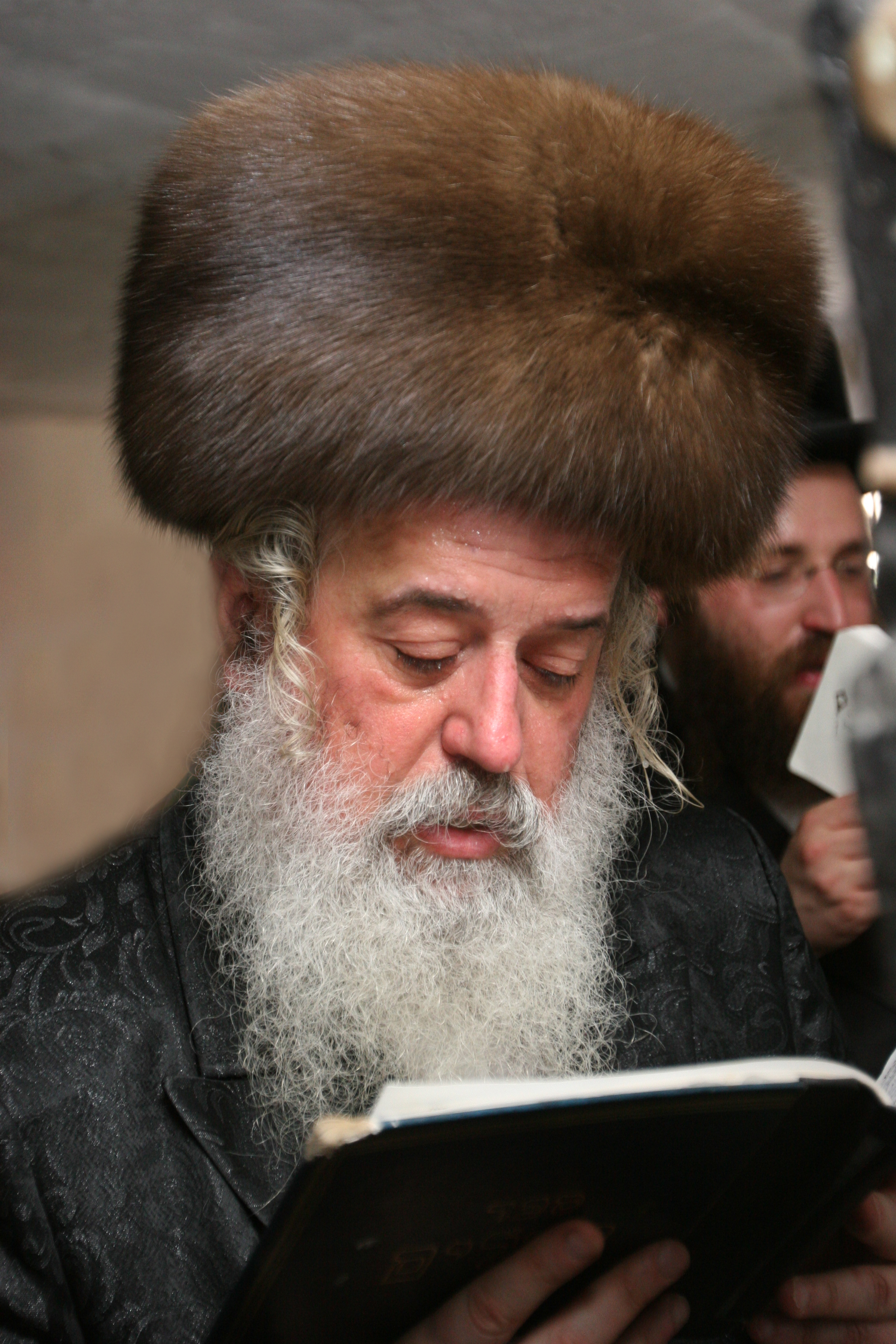
Zvi Elimelech Spira of Dynów and Munkatch; Bnei Yisoschor
Eluzar Spira of Strzyżów and Łańcut; Yodai Binah
Shlomo Spira of Strzyżów and Munkatch; Shem Shlomo
Zvi Hirsh Spira of Munkatch; Darchei Tshuva
Chaim Elazar Spira of Munkatch; Minchas Elazar
Baruch Yehoshua Yerachmiel Rabinowicz of Munkatch
Moshe Leib Rabinovich of Munkatch Current Rebbe

== Roots ==
The dynasty traces its roots to Grand Rebbe Zvi Elimelech Spira (1783–1841), rabbi of Munkács, and later Dynów in Galicia. Spira was an adherent of the Polish Hasidic leader Rabbi Yaakov Yitzchak of Lublin (the Chozeh, or "seer", of Lublin) and of his uncle, Rabbi Elimelech of Lizhensk, author of Noam Elimelech. Rabbi Spira was instrumental in bringing Hasidic Judaism to Hungary. He authored works such as Agra D'kala and Chidushei Mahartza. He is commonly referred to by the title of his most famous work, B'nei Yissachar (Children of [the tribe] Issachar). This book was named for the biblical Issachar, son of Jacob, because he was told by Rabbi Yaakov Yitzchak of Lublin that he was a direct descendant of the tribe of Issachar. His descendants became leaders of the communities of Dynów, Poland, (called Dinov in Yiddish), Munkács, Hungary (now Mukachevo, Ukraine) (called Munkatsh in Yiddish), and Błażowa, Poland (called Blazhov in Yiddish). From female descendants the dynasties of Tosh, Spinka, and Krula also descended. Rabbi Spira was succeeded by his son, Rabbi Eluzer Spira of Lanczut, Poland, who was succeeded by his son, Rabbi Shlomo Spira of Munkács, author of Shem Sh'lomo. He, in turn, was succeeded by his son, Rabbi Tzvi Hirsh Spira of Munkács, author of Darkhei T'shuvah.

== Pre-World War II Munkacs ==
The Rebbe of Munkács, Grand Rebbe Chaim Elazar Spira, who led the community from 1913 until his death in 1937, was the most outspoken voice of religious anti-Zionism. He had succeeded his father, Grand Rebbe Zvi Hirsh Spira, who had earlier inherited the mantle of leadership from his father, Grand Rebbe Shlomo Spira. Rabbi Chaim Elazar led his community with dignity and gained worldwide respect for Munkács. His keen understanding and vast knowledge of Jewish law and scripture, as well as worldly matters, drew people to his home, where they sought his advice and blessings. Under his leadership, the Munkács Jewish community grew rapidly. At the time of his death in 1937, over half of the town's inhabitants were Jewish. After his death in May 1937, leaving an only daughter, Frima, he was succeeded as rebbe by his son-in-law, Grand Rabbi Baruch Yehoshua Yerachmiel Rabinovich, who led the Munkacs dynasty with success until the outbreak of World War II. After World War II, Rabbi Baruch was removed from his position as the Rebbe.

== Munkacs today ==
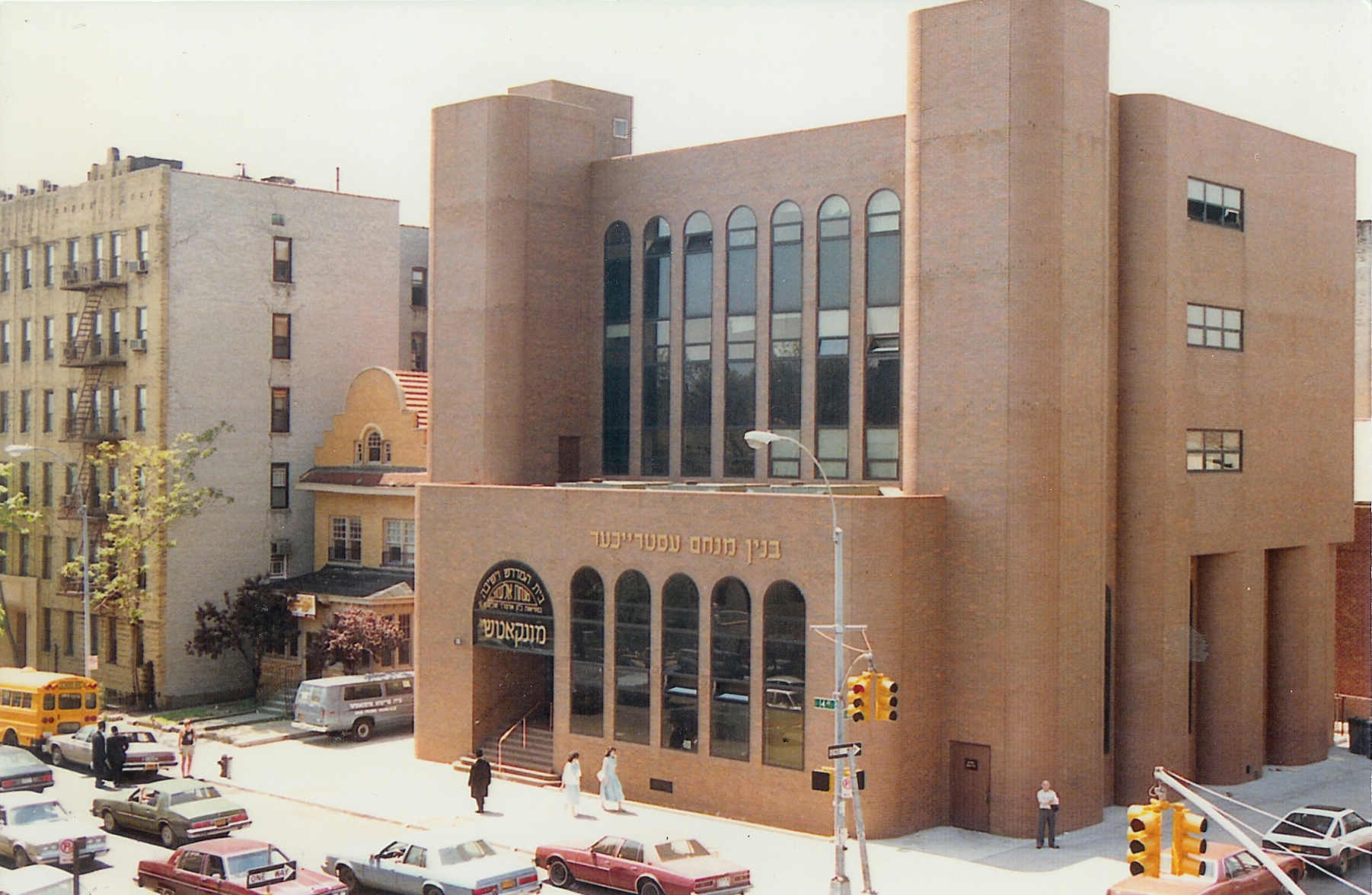
Munkacs World Headquarters in Boro Park

After the Holocaust, the Munkacs dynasty and community were re-established in the United States, in Brooklyn, New York, and developed a close affinity with the Satmar Hasidim, who also originated from northeastern Hungary (namely Szatmár county, hence the name of the dynasty).

Currently, the Munkacs dynasty is led by the son of Rabbi Baruch, Grand Rebbe Moshe Leib Rabinovich. The role of rabbi and rosh yeshiva split following his eldest son Chaim Eleazer's coming of age; Chaim Eleazer is in charge of running the yeshiva in Borough Park and decides on what is taught and what material is learnt in English. He has been successful in the Hebrew department, and Munkacs's yeshiva has gained recognition for its students' ability to learn Talmud and Jewish law. It was the first to admit Litvaks, mostly from Lakewood. The yeshiva finds them housing in a community apart from the three hundred native students; about fifty of these people have enrolled. Less important to the Jewish world, Reb Chaim Eleazar has seen that more functional secular studies are taught. Although the secular studies are basic, yeshiva students passed the state test with only thirty percent failing, unlike Satmar, where seventy to eighty percent of boys failed, leading the government to cease funding the latter sect's yeshiva. In addition, Chaim Eleazer is heir apparent, with his only brother, Yerucham Fishel, being a modest figure. Chaim Eleazer later became head of the educational institutes in Monsey, though he still lives in Brooklyn near his father.

The sect's main Brooklyn synagogue, which seats thirteen hundred and which also serves as world headquarters for Munkacs Hasidim, is located in the Boro Park section of Brooklyn. The Hasidic group also boasts a plethora of educational and charitable institutions across the United States, Canada, England, Israel, and Australia. The two communities in Brooklyn (Williamsburg and Borough Park) have about nine thousand members, the ones in Canada have about five thousand, in the US eight thousand, in Europe proper six hundred, in England eight thousand, in Australia eight hundred, and in Israel ten thousand. Pre-World War II, it had up to eighty thousand members. After the war, the dynasty had only several thousand survivors. It now numbers about twenty to thirty thousand members, made up of twenty-five hundred families.

=== Educational institutions ===
Rabbi Moshe Leib Rabinovich founded a network of large educational institutions, both yeshivas and girls' schools, from pre-school through high school, as well as post-graduate advanced learning kollels for married men. The girls' schools are called Bnos Frima, and the yeshivas Tiferes Bunim. Due to limited space, Rabbi Moshe Leib founded a learning program for extra boys who are given a Talmudic tractate to learn and receive a stipend and gifts depending on how well they do on a test. The schools are known for a high quality, in-depth study of Talmud. They dislike hiring Litvaks or members of other groups to teach. Thus, after kollel, the boys often become rabbis in the school. Other than this, the community has many ritual scribes and kosher butchers, most of whom commute to Kiryas Joel to butcher Satmar meat, and the scribes work throughout New York.

The sect is known to strongly discourage boys from secular jobs that conflict with Jewish law (doctor, because of college or where they would be with women) and instead get as many as possible into the kollel. Limiting employment opportunities has led to the sect being to some degree poorer than others. By contrast, some sects, such as Satmar, have rich men who may donate millions to the community, where boys are expected to have a high standard of living and give back to the community through schools, feeding the poor, etc. Though on average Munkacs men have more stable jobs, unlike some groups where almost all families survive on charity or government funding. In total, the population enrolled in the various educational institutions exceeds seven thousand worldwide.

Munkacs also operates youth summer camps, Chaim V'Shalom, in the Catskill Mountains during the summer months. Three of these camps exist for boys under fifteen. The older boys' yeshiva unofficially rents out various bungalows and cabins for them. There is another camp for kids in Canada.

=== Publishing ===
Hotzoas EMES (Hebrew acronym for O'hr T'orah M'unkacs) publishes the works of the rebbes of Munkacs, as well as periodicals on news and subjects of interest to the Munkacs Hasidic community. To date, they have published hundreds of works, which are used by Talmudic scholars around the world.

== Spiritual lineage from Baal Shem Tov ==
- Rebbe Yisrael Baal Shem Tov – founder of Hasidism
  - Rebbe Dovber, the Maggid of Mezritch – primary disciple of the Baal Shem Tov
    - Rebbe Elimelech of Lizhensk, author of Noam Elimelech – disciple of the Maggid of Mezritch
      - Rebbe Yaakov Yitzchak, the Seer of Lublin, author of Zikoron Zos – disciple of Rebbe Elimelech of Lizhensk

== Dynasty ==
- Grand Rabbi Tzvi Elimelech Spira of Dynów/Munkács, author of B'nei Yisoschor, a disciple of the Seer of Lublin
  - Grand Rabbi Eleazar Spira of Strzyżów and Łańcut, author of Yod'ei Binah, son of the B'nei Yisoschor
    - Grand Rabbi Shlomo Spira of Strzyżów and Munkács, author of Shem Sh'lomo, son of the Yod'ei Binah
      - Grand Rabbi Tzvi Hirsch Spira of Munkács, author of Darkhei T'shuvah, son of the Shem Sh'lomo
        - Grand Rabbi Chaim Elazar Spira of Munkács, author of Minchas El'azar, son of the Darkhei T'shuvah
          - Grand Rabbi Baruch Yehoshua Yerachmiel Rabinovich, son-in-law of the Minchas El'azar
            - Grand Rabbi Moshe Leib Rabinovich, son of Rebbe Baruch, current Munkacser Rebbe
