= Hayyim ben Isaac Raphael Alfandari =

Rabbi in Constantinople and in Palestine (1660–1733)

- חיים בן יצחק אלפאנדארי

Personal life
- Born: c. 1660 Constantinople, Ottoman Empire
- Died: 1733 Palestine, Ottoman Empire
- Occupation: Rabbi

Religious life
- Religion: Judaism
- Denomination: Judaism
- Main work: Esh Dat; Muẓẓal me-Esh (with his uncle)

Hayyim ben Isaac Raphael Alfandari (Hebrew: חיים בן יצחק אלפאנדארי; c. 1660–1733) was rabbi in Constantinople during the latter half of the 17th and in the beginning of the 18th century. In his old age he went to Palestine, where he died. He was the author of Esh Dat (A Fiery Law), a collection of homilies printed together with his uncle's Muẓẓal me-Esh (Hebrew: מוצל מאש) in Constantinople, 1718. Several short treatises by him are published in the works of others. Azulai speaks very highly of him as a scholar and as a preacher.

He is a member of the notable Alfandari family.

== See also ==
- Hayyim ben Menahem Algazi
