= List of automobile manufacturers of Poland =

This is a list of current and defunct automobile manufacturers of Poland.

== Current manufacturers ==
- Arrinera (2008–2021)
- Hydrocar (2016–present)
- Leopard Automobile (2005–present)
- Melex (1971–present)

=== Foreign manufacturers currently building in Poland ===
- Stellantis, formerly FCA Poland (1992–present)

== Former manufacturers ==
- CWS (1918–1928)
- FSC (1948–present (no longer produces cars))
- FSM (1948–1992)
- FSO (1948–present (no longer produces cars))
- FSR
- Mikrus (1957–1960) (PZL Mielec)
- PZInż (1928–1939)
- Ralf-Stetysz (1924–1929) (K. Rudzki i S-ka)

=== Former contract manufacturers ===
- LRL (1818–1948) produced Chevrolet vehicles

=== Former joint ventures ===
- FSO-Daewoo (1995–2004)
- Polski Fiat (1932–1939, 1967–1992)

=== Foreign manufacturers formerly building in Poland ===
- Intrall Poland (2004–2007)
