= Wola Cicha =

- Village
- Location within Poland
- Coordinates: 50°8′N 21°58′E
- Country: Poland
- Voivodeship: Subcarpathian
- County: Rzeszów County
- Town: Głogów Małopolski

Wola Cicha [ˈvɔla ˈt͡ɕixa] is a village which was until 31 December 2019 in the administrative district of Gmina Głogów Małopolski, within Rzeszów County, Subcarpathian Voivodeship, in south-eastern Poland. From 1 January 2020 it became part of the town of Głogów Małopolski. It lies approximately 4 kilometres (2 mi) south of Głogów Małopolski and 12 km (7 mi) north of the regional capital Rzeszów.
