= Pogwizdów Nowy =

- District of Rzeszów
- Location within Poland Location within Subcarpathian Voivodeship
- Coordinates: 50°5′N 21°59′E
- Country: Poland
- Voivodeship: Subcarpathian
- County/City: Rzeszów
- Within city limits: 2021
- Time zone: UTC+1 (CET)
  - Summer (DST): UTC+2 (CEST)
- Vehicle registration: RZ
- Primary airport: Rzeszów–Jasionka Airport

Pogwizdów Nowy [pɔɡˈvizduf ˈnɔvɨ] is a district of Rzeszów, Poland, located in the northern part of the city.

It was included within the city limits of Rzeszów on 1 January 2021. Earlier, it was a separate village, located in the administrative district of Gmina Głogów Małopolski, within Rzeszów County, Subcarpathian Voivodeship.
