= Special Economic Zone Euro-Park Mielec =

Oldest SEZ in Poland

Mielec Euro-Park Special Economic Zone is the oldest SEZ in Poland. It was founded in 1995 in Mielec.

As of April 2012, SEZ Euro-Park Mielec spreads on the total area or 1246 ha in the following locations:

- Mielec – 605 ha
- Rzeszów (including neighboring Głogów Małopolski and Trzebownisko) – 170 ha
- Lublin – 118 ha
- Szczecin – 73 ha
- Zamość – 54 ha
- Krosno – 36 ha
- Leżajsk – 27 ha
- Dębica – 35 ha
- Gorlice – 21 ha
- Lubartów – 20 ha
- Jarosław – 14 ha
- Ropczyce and Gmina Ostrów – 45 ha
- Sanok – 15 ha
- Lubaczów – 9 ha
- Kolbuszowa – 8 ha
- Radzyń Podlaski – 2 ha
