= Zabajka =

- Village
- Location within Poland
- Coordinates: 50°9′N 21°57′E
- Country: Poland
- Voivodeship: Subcarpathian
- County: Rzeszów County
- Town: Głogów Małopolski

Zabajka [zaˈbai̯ka] is a village which was until 31 December 2019 in the administrative district of Gmina Głogów Małopolski, within Rzeszów County, Subcarpathian Voivodeship, in south-eastern Poland. From 1 January 2020 it became part of the town of Głogów Małopolski. It lies approximately 3 kilometres (2 mi) south-west of Głogów Małopolski and 14 km (9 mi) north of the regional capital Rzeszów.
