= Maria Liwo =

Polish lawyer and activist

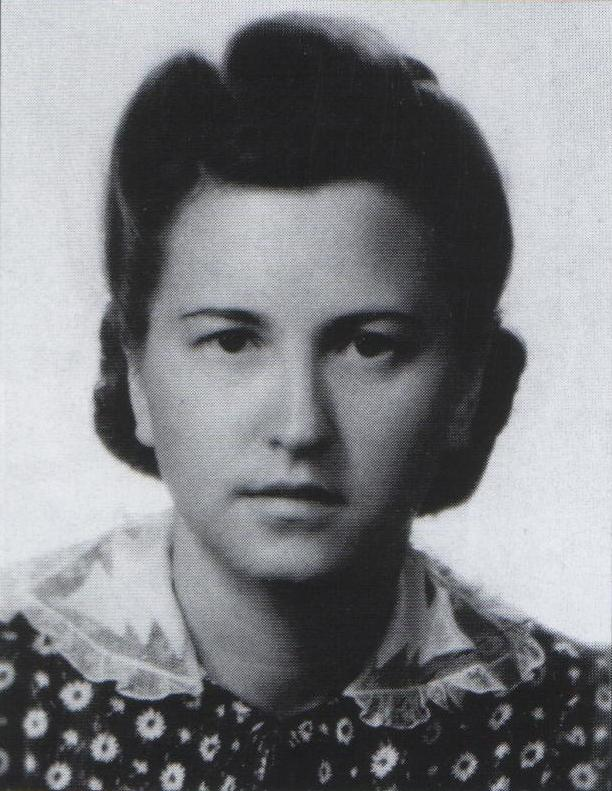
Maria Liwo

Maria Janina Liwo (January 23, 1916 in Mielec – January 29, 1984 in Rzeszów) was a Polish lawyer, an activist of national organizations, Gestapo prisoner. From the beginning of the German occupation, she organized the first links of the national conspiracy in Rzeszów. After the liberation of Ravensbruck, she returned to Poland in spring 1945 and resumed judicial training in Rzeszów and worked as a court assessor.
