= Wysoka Głogowska =

- Village
- Location within Poland
- Coordinates: 50°09′01.2″N 22°00′59″E
- Country: Poland
- Voivodeship: Subcarpathian
- County: Rzeszów
- Gmina: Głogów Małopolski
- Population: 2,213

Wysoka Głogowska [vɨˈsɔka ɡwɔˈɡɔfska] is a village in the administrative district of Gmina Głogów Małopolski, within Rzeszów County, Subcarpathian Voivodeship, in south-eastern Poland.
