= Lipie, Rzeszów County =

Lipie
- Village
- Location within Poland
- Coordinates: 50°6′57″N 21°56′35″E
- Country: Poland
- Voivodeship: Subcarpathian
- County: Rzeszów
- Gmina: Głogów Małopolski

Lipie [ˈlipjɛ] is a village in the administrative district of Gmina Głogów Małopolski, within Rzeszów County, Subcarpathian Voivodeship, in south-eastern Poland.
