= Przewrotne =

- Village
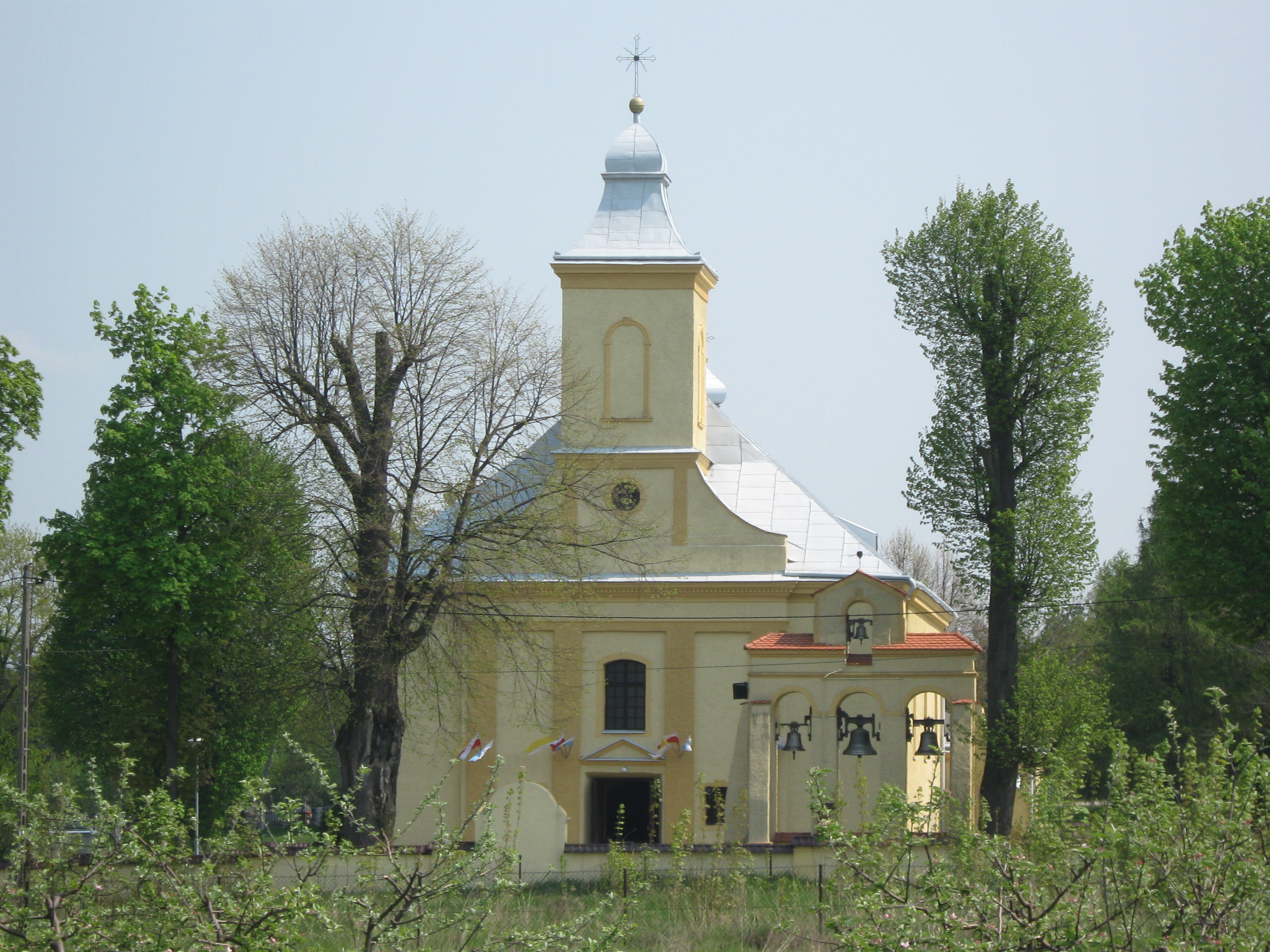
- Church of Saint Anthony of Padua

- Location within Poland
- Coordinates: 50°13′N 21°57′E
- Country: Poland
- Voivodeship: Subcarpathian
- County: Rzeszów
- Gmina: Głogów Małopolski

Population
  - Total: 1,726

Przewrotne [pʂɛˈvrɔtnɛ] is a village in the administrative district of Gmina Głogów Małopolski, within Rzeszów County, Subcarpathian Voivodeship, in south-eastern Poland.
