= Rudna Mała, Podkarpackie Voivodeship =

Rudna Mała
- Village
- Location within Poland
- Coordinates: 50°5′52″N 21°57′34″E
- Country: Poland
- Voivodeship: Subcarpathian
- County: Rzeszów
- Gmina: Głogów Małopolski
- Population: 1,100

Rudna Mała [ˈrudna ˈmawa] is a village in the administrative district of Gmina Głogów Małopolski, within Rzeszów County, Subcarpathian Voivodeship, in south-eastern Poland.
