= Kamil Rado =

Polish footballer (born 1990)

Personal information
- Full name: Kamil Rado
- Date of birth: 20 September 1990 (age 36)
- Place of birth: Mielec, Poland
- Height: 1.73 m (5 ft 8 in)
- Position: Midfielder

Youth career
- –2007: Stal Mielec
- 2008–2009: Wisła Kraków

Senior career*
| Years | Team | Apps | (Gls) |
| 2007–2008 | Stal Mielec | 11 | (1) |
| 2008–2010 | Wisła Kraków (ME) | 46 | (8) |
| 2010–2011 | Wisła Kraków | 2 | (0) |
| 2011 | → Kolejarz Stróże (loan) | 11 | (0) |
| 2011–2012 | Garbarnia Kraków | 33 | (2) |
| 2013–2022 | Kolorado Wola Chorzelowska | | |
- * Club domestic league appearances and goals

Kamil Rado (born 20 September 1990) is a Polish former professional footballer who played as a midfielder.

== Career ==
He made his debut for Wisła Kraków in Ekstraklasa on 8 August 2010 in a match against Arka Gdynia.

In February 2011, he was loaned to Kolejarz Stróże on a half year deal.

== Honours ==
Wisła Kraków

- Ekstraklasa: 2010–11

Kolorado Wola Chorzelowska

- Klasa A Rzeszów III: 2016–17
