= Mielec forced labor camp =

Nazi forced labor camp near Mielec, Poland

Mielec was a forced labor camp on the outskirts of Mielec, Poland, established by the Nazi-Germany occupation authorities in 1941 at the site of the former Polish airplane factory known as the Mielec Flugzeugwerke. This was a forced labor camp for Polish Jews during the war which eventually turned into an SS Concentration Camp until it was liquidated in 1944. There is no Nazi documentation that says the exact number of prisoners that were at the camp throughout the war or when it switched from a labor camp to a concentration camp, and testimonies of Jews in the camps are conflicting.

== Before the war ==
Before the war, Mielec was a draw for economic activity because it was included in one of the biggest industrial regions in Poland called C.O.P (Central Industrial Region (Poland)). This brought a lot of people to the area, many of which were non-Jews. This created a competitive economic atmosphere which increased tensions between Jews and non-Jewish Poles, and Jews would often have their homes looted or the windows of their businesses or homes broken, creating an antisemitic attitude even before the war started.

== German invasion ==
On September 1, 1939, Germany invaded Poland. By September 13 they had taken over Mielec, especially attracted to the aircraft factory, and by October 5 the conquest of Poland was complete. Once German leaders replaced the Polish authorities, the anti-Jewish discrimination in Mielec expanded, with more looting of Jewish stores and Jews being recruited to perform menial labor tasks like sweeping sidewalks and washing cars. In 1939, 30–40 Jews in Mielec were killed on the eve of Rosh Hashanah, after the Germans surrounded the Mikveh in which they were gathered and set it on fire. Those who tried to escape were shot and those who remained inside perished in the fire.

By January 1940, there were labor camps all over Poland. On March 9, 1942, the Jews in Mielec who had not already been transported to other labor camps were marched at gunpoint to the aircraft factory on the outskirts of the city where they were then impounded. Any sick, elderly, injured, weak or prominent figures were shot and buried in a mass grave.

== Life in the camp ==
Jews in the Mielec labor camp faced brutal conditions. The camp was about two and a half acres of land surrounded by electrically charged barbed wire with a few wooden barracks to house the 1500 to 2000 prisoners that would be there at one time. The labor camp was originally run by the Werkschutz, the Factory protection police, and their leader Gotthold Stein, but was later taken over by the Schutzstaffeln (SS) and supervised by their leader at the time, Gottlieb Hering. In the camp, prisoners would be woken up at 5 AM, and then work from 6 AM to 6 PM doing things like producing airplane parts, cleaning the factory, and loading and unloading cargo. For breakfast the prisoners got black coffee and seven ounces of bread, and for lunch and dinner they got a soup made of cabbage leaves and grub. This led to many dying from starvation or collapsing due to weakness and then being shot because of it.

Another large cause of death in the camp was disease. There was a typhus epidemic in 1942 that affected hundreds of prisoners, and rather than being treated they were brought to the woods and shot by Germans.

=== The Ordungsdienst ===
One of the forces that controlled the camp was the Jüdischer Ordnungsdienst or Jewish Police Service. While some members of this force were sympathetic with their Jewish counterparts, others were violent towards the prisoners because they wanted to be in good graces of the Germans and spare their own lives.

Two members, Doctor Birm and Jacob Keimann, voluntarily chose which Jews were going to be executed daily. Another member, Buciu Gotinger who was a kapo (prisoner functionary) regularly tortured and beat the prisoners, making them perform hard labor tasks until they couldn’t anymore, and then he would beat them with a wooden floorboard until they became unconscious.

However, not all members of the Jewish Police Service in Mielec were violent toward other Jews. The first leader of the Ordungsdienst at the camp was named Bitkower, and he and his wife were well liked and respected by the prisoners. According to a testimony from one of the prisoners, Ajzik Leibovicz, Bitkower asked about his family and where he was from, and when he saw that Leibovicz was sick one night, Bitkower told him to go see his wife (who was a doctor) in the morning and get treated. He listened to Bitkower and the next morning Mrs. Bitkower treated him and gave him injections which was not common practice in the labor camps.

== Concentration camp ==
There is no Nazi documentation that says exactly when the camp changed from a labor camp to a concentration camp, but it may have been after Gottlieb Hering arrived in 1943 or when Josef Schwammberger arrived in February 1944. However, it is known that the camp had definitely transformed into a concentration camp by spring of 1944 because prisoners had started to have "KL" (Konzentrationslager) tattoos onto them.

== Liquidation and liberation ==
There are conflicting testimonies from prisoners of when exactly the Mielec labor camp began to evacuate, but it is agreed upon that by August 1944, most of the Jews had been sent to other camps, mainly to Płaszów, either directly or by way of Wieliczka salt mine. There is also a Polish book that says the camp was evacuated in July after an order from Amon Göth when the Red army had advanced within 50 miles of Mielec.

The Jews were transported in overcrowded cargo wagons, many dying due to disease or hunger. In January 1945, when the Soviets were almost at Mielec, the remaining Jews at the camp were hastily evacuated to other camps, but because of the brutal winter conditions, many died on the way and those who survived were killed at their destination camps. By January 23, 1945, the Soviets had liberated Mielec.
