= Hucisko, Rzeszów County =

Hucisko
- Village
- Location within Poland
- Coordinates: 50°13′N 22°2′E
- Country: Poland
- Voivodeship: Subcarpathian
- County: Rzeszów
- Gmina: Głogów Małopolski

Hucisko ([xuˈt͡ɕiskɔ]) is a village in the administrative district of Gmina Głogów Małopolski, within Rzeszów County, Subcarpathian Voivodeship, in south-eastern Poland.
