= Mielec Airport =

Mielec Airport Port Lotniczy Mielec
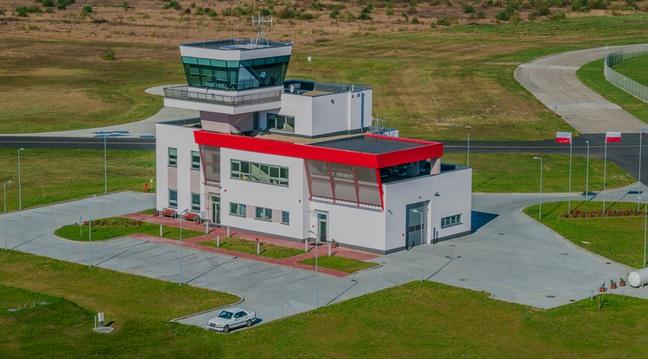
- IATA: QPM; ICAO: EPML

Summary
- Airport type: Public
- Serves: Mielec, Poland
- Elevation AMSL: 167 m / 548 ft
- Coordinates: 50°19′20″N 21°27′44″E
- Website: https://www.lotniskomielec.pl/

Map
- Location of airport in Poland

Runways
Direction	Length		Surface
Direction	m	ft	Surface
08R/26L	2,492	8,175	Concrete

Statistics (2007 +/- change from 2006)
- Passengers: 0
- Cargo (in tons): 0
- Takeoffs/Landings: 0
- Source: Polish AIP at EUROCONTROL

Mielec Airport - a general aviation airport located in the city of Mielec. The airport offers an APV-I instrument approach and an aviation fuel station.

== History ==
The airport opened in 1938.

Formerly the airport served military and industrial purposes, being managed by the company PZL Cargo.

During the renovation of the runway of Rzeszów airport in December 2004 the airport was intended to be used as a replacement for the runway at Rzeszów-Jasionka Airport.

== Airport infrastructure ==
There exists a railroad line next to the terminal that can be used for passenger service or industry. Airport offers an APV-I instrument approach and an aviation fuel station with avgas and Jet A-1 type fuels.

Experts estimate that it could handle even large aircraft. Its location offers a chance to serve the parts of Świętokrzyskie and Małopolska regions, that are otherwise not covered by other airports.
