= Budy Głogowskie =

- Village
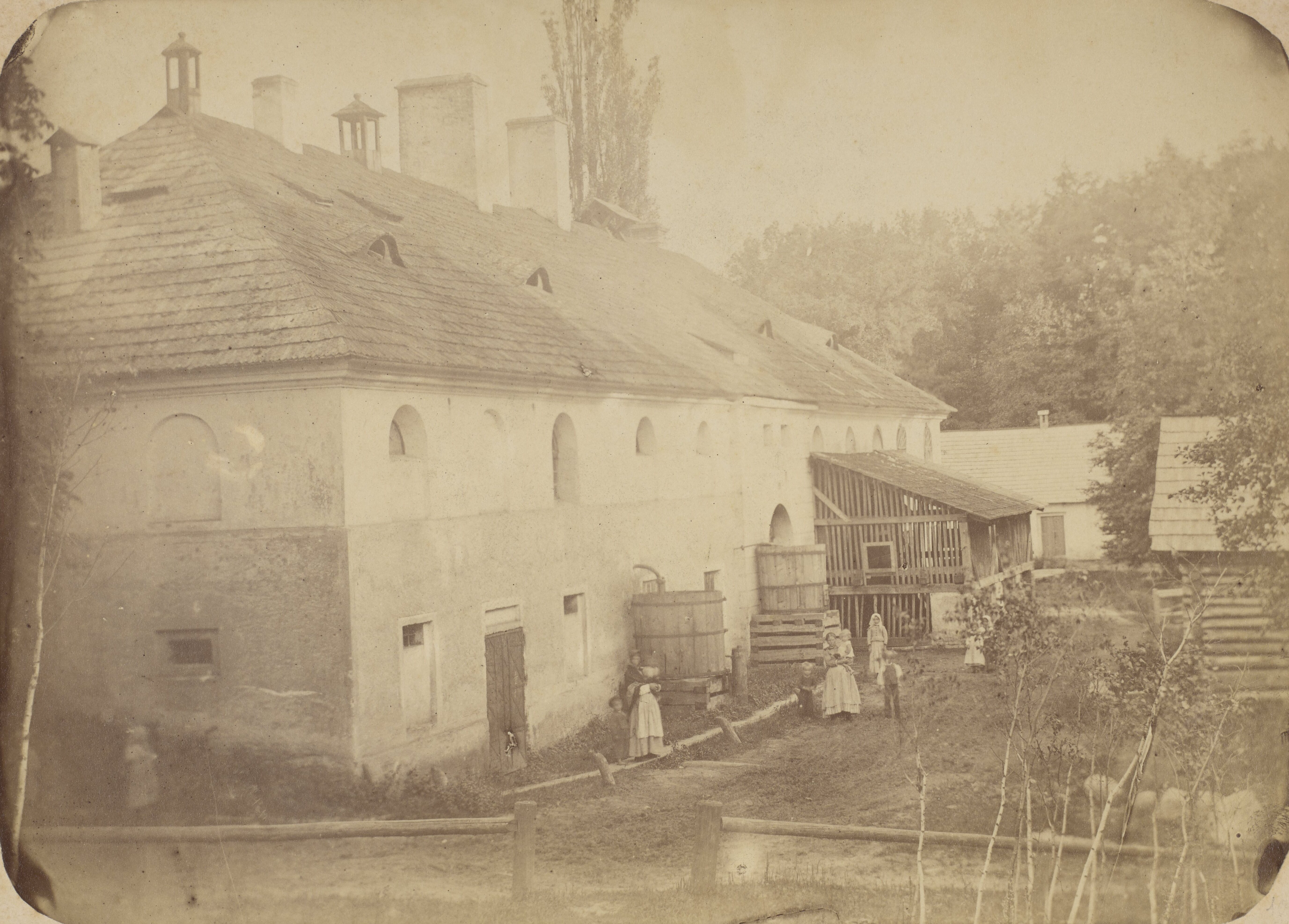
- Distillery, c. 1880

- Location within Poland
- Coordinates: 50°09′39″N 21°54′21″E
- Country: Poland
- Voivodeship: Subcarpathian
- County: Rzeszów
- Gmina: Głogów Małopolski
- Population: 1,800

Budy Głogowskie ([ˈbudɨ ɡwɔˈɡɔfskʲɛ]) is a village in the administrative district of Gmina Głogów Małopolski, within Rzeszów County, Subcarpathian Voivodeship, in south-eastern Poland.
