= Pogwizdów Stary =

- Village
- Location within Poland
- Coordinates: 50°14′26″N 21°57′59″E
- Country: Poland
- Voivodeship: Subcarpathian
- County: Rzeszów
- Gmina: Głogów Małopolski

Pogwizdów Stary [pɔɡˈvizduf ˈstarɨ] is a village in the administrative district of Gmina Głogów Małopolski, within Rzeszów County, Subcarpathian Voivodeship, in south-eastern Poland. According to the 2021 census, the village has a population of 489.
