= Melex =

Electric vehicle

Melex is a Polish manufacturer of electric microcars based in Mielec, operating since 1971.

The company MELEX has gained such significant popularity that the name MELEX has become synonymous with small electric vehicles. The company has received numerous awards and distinctions, such as the Forbes Diamonds, Qltowa Marka, TERAZ POLSKA, and the Economic Award of the President of Poland in the category of International Product in the entire segment of the electric vehicle market. The MELEX brand holds ISO 9001 and ISO 14001 certifications.

== History ==
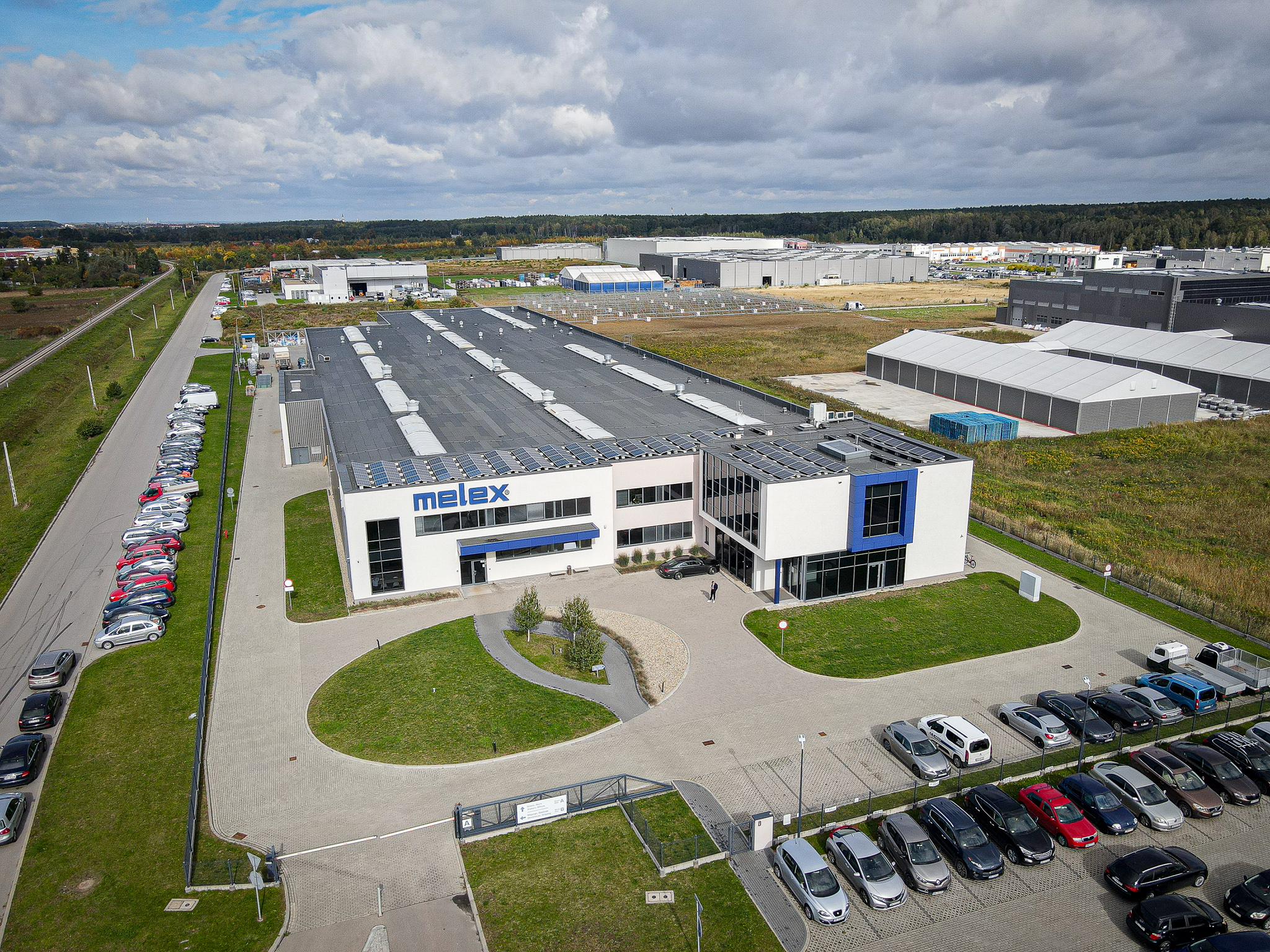

=== Beginnings ===
Electric vehicles have been produced by the Wytwórnia Sprzętu Komunikacyjnego "PZL-Mielec" since 1971 in the newly established department of the aircraft factory in Mielec. Their production began with the intention of exporting to the American market. Initially, they were produced as three-wheeled golf carts, and by 1973, the product range was expanded to include four-wheeled passenger, cargo, and golf carts. The design of the vehicle family was overseen by Janusz Zygadlewicz.

The most popular variant in Poland became the two-seater cargo vehicle with an open body. In the Melex WGE-3 variant, it could carry 150 kg of cargo. Gradually, variants with enclosed cabins also appeared. By 1977, over 46,000 Melex vehicles had been produced, with a significant portion being exported; annual production reached about 10,000 units.

Logo Melex

=== Division ===
In 1993, as a result of the division and privatization of WSK PZL-Mielec, Melex began operating as a separate company. On 1 September 2004, the company was purchased by Andrzej and Dorota Tyszkiewicz and began operating as a general partnership under the name Melex A&D Tyszkiewicz. In 2021, the company was acquired by the Danish manufacturer of golf vehicles, Garia A/S. In 2022, the company Garia A/S, along with Melex, was acquired by the American company Club Car.

=== Popularity ===
Nowadays, vehicles under this name are produced in several variations with different purposes, categorized into three groups: passenger vehicles, cargo vehicles, and special-purpose vehicles. They are used in various settings, including golf courses, historic city centers, airports, train stations, cemeteries, factories, logistics centers, parks, zoos, and other enclosed areas.

Vehicles from Mielec are highly popular in their class—so much so that electric carts from other companies are often referred to as "Melexes." Melex is a registered trademark. It was registered in two graphic versions by the Wytwórnia Sprzętu Komunikacyjnego "PZL-Mielec" and in one by the company "Melex A&D Tyszkiewicz." Additionally, this company has registered "meleks" as a wordmark.

== Contemporary versions ==
- Cargo
- Passenger
- Special-Purpose
- Homologated
- Non-Homologated
