= Leopard 6 Litre Roadster =

Leopard
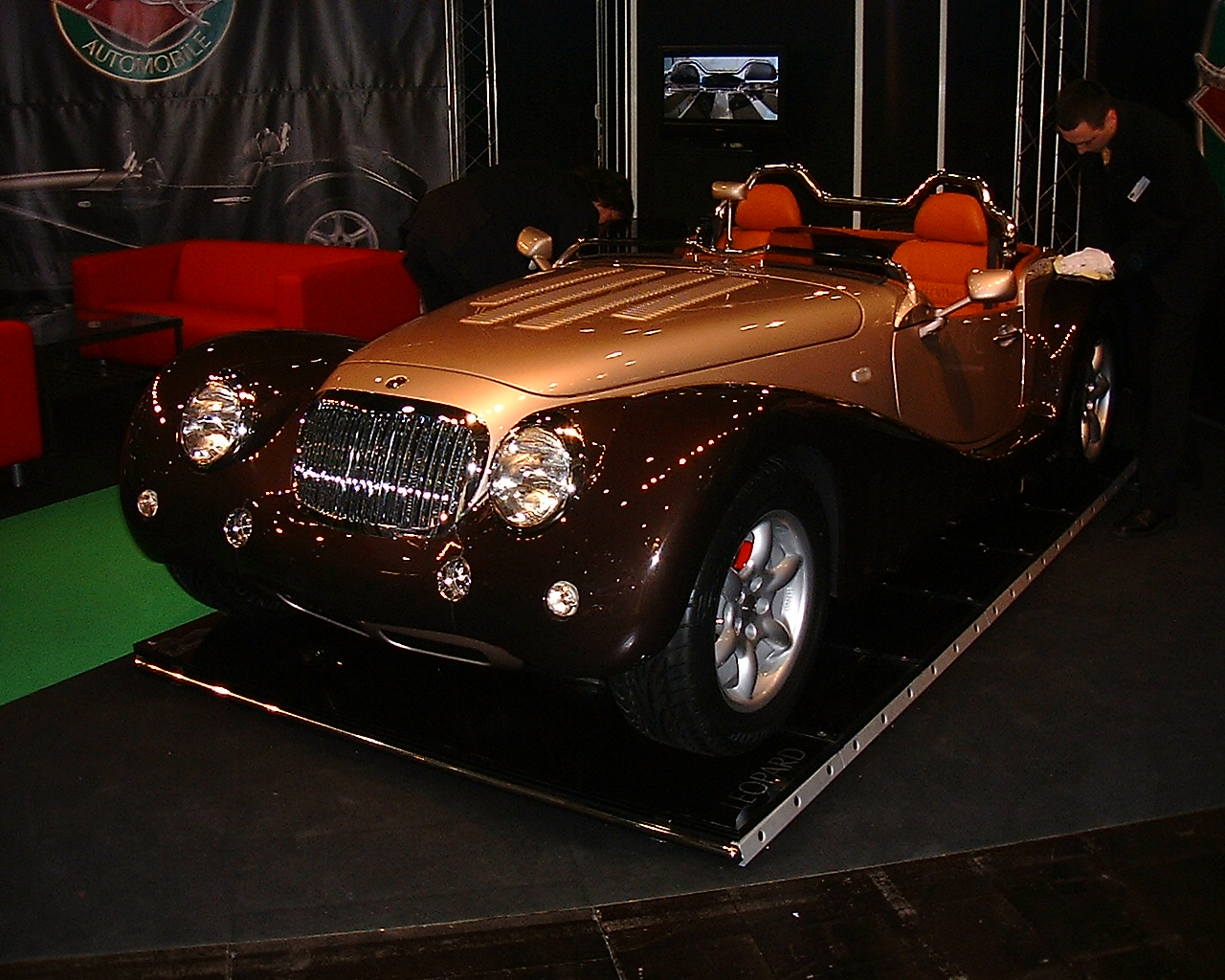
- Leopard 6-litre at the 2007 Leipzig Auto Mobil International

Overview
- Manufacturer: Leopard Automobile Mielec Sp. z o.o.
- Production: 2005–present
- Assembly: Poland

Body and chassis
- Class: Roadster

Powertrain
- Engine: 6.0 L LS2 V8
- Transmission: 6-speed manual

Leopard 6 Litre Roadster is a classical sport-style luxury car designed by entrepreneur Zbysław Szwaj. The car is produced by a privately held Polish company Leopard Automobile Mielec Sp. z o.o. Zbysław Szwaj is the company co-founder, designer, and also the designer of the Gepard car.

== Construction ==
First historical design sketches of this sports car were made at V. Vemmerlöv in Sweden. The new Leopard 6 Liter's Roadster, with the exception of the GM LS2 All-aluminum V8 engine (also powering the Chevrolet Corvette), is completely hand crafted at a small production facility at Mielec, Republic of Poland. The current production capacity at the new factory is limited to only 25 units per year.

== Technical data ==
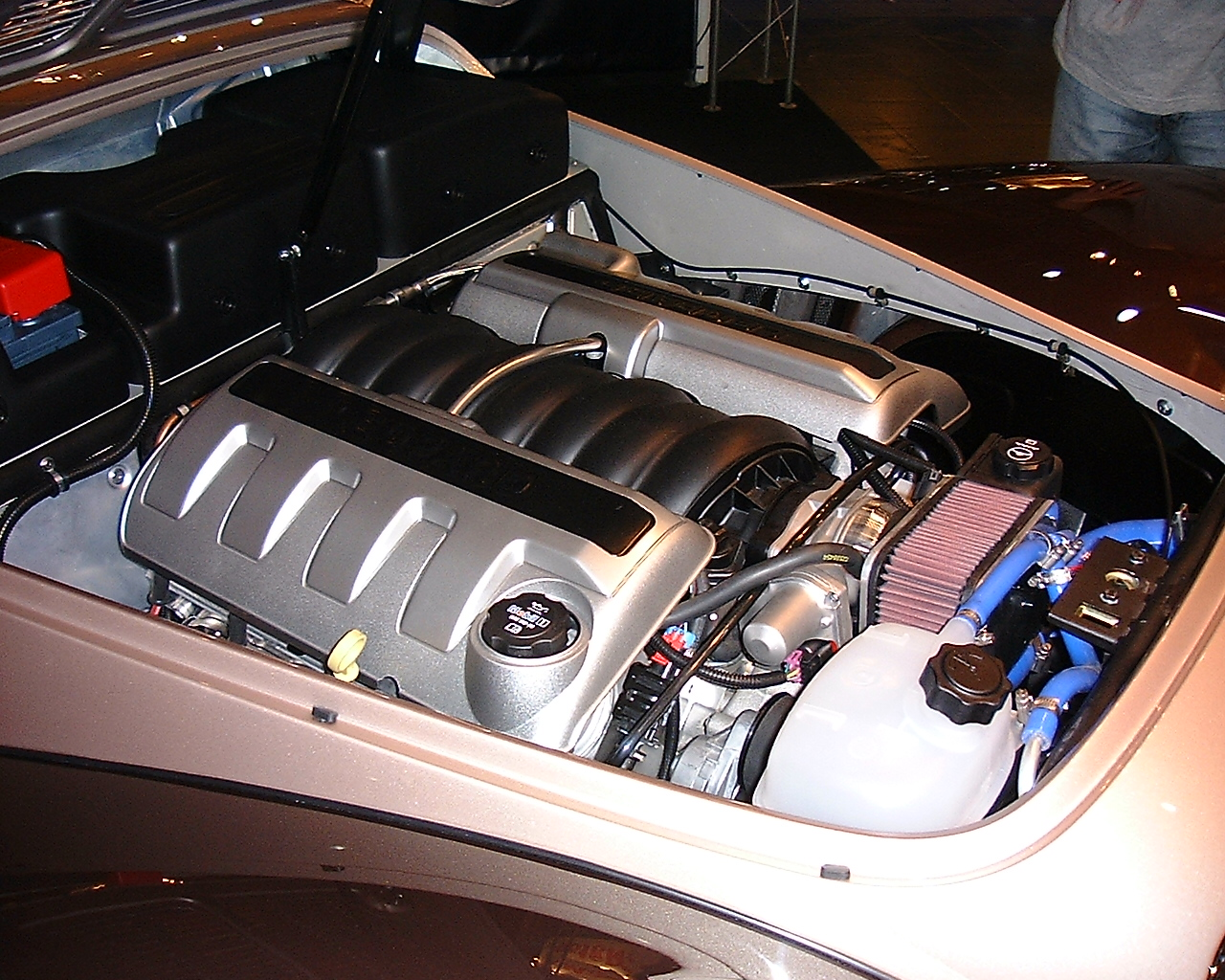
Leopard engine bay

The body was handcrafted from aluminium with a tubular space frame chassis. The engine was an aluminium V8 5967 ccm developing 405 hp (302 kW) at 6000 rpm, and 542 N⋅m (400 lbf⋅ft) at 4400 rpm, paired to a 6-speed manual gearbox. The brakes were Brembo 4-pistons. Performance specs indicate an acceleration of 0-100 km/h (62 mph) in less than 4 seconds with an electronically limited top speed of 250 km/h (155 mph).

== Launch ==
Although the design of the newest version of vehicle started about 1995, the first car was completed about November 2003. The Leopard 6 Liters Roadster was officially launched about April 2005 in Paris, France, first units to hit the market were produced about late 2005, now selling for about €130,000. Leopard is claiming the title of the most expensive ever commercially produced Polish vehicle. The total number of manufactured units currently stands about 25 and is to be limited to maximum of 200 to retain the exclusive status. The manufacturer is preparing a new, stronger, Leopard Coupe model.

== Pictures gallery ==
- pictures gallery
- Leopard
- Roadster Coupe
- Pictures gallery
- Leopard Automobile logo
- front
- rear right side view
- rear left side view
- frame
- cockpit rear view
- cockpit right side view
- Zbysław Szwaj and his dream Leopard
- Specs
- Manufacturing quarters
