= Mielec =

City in Subcarpathian Voivodeship, Poland

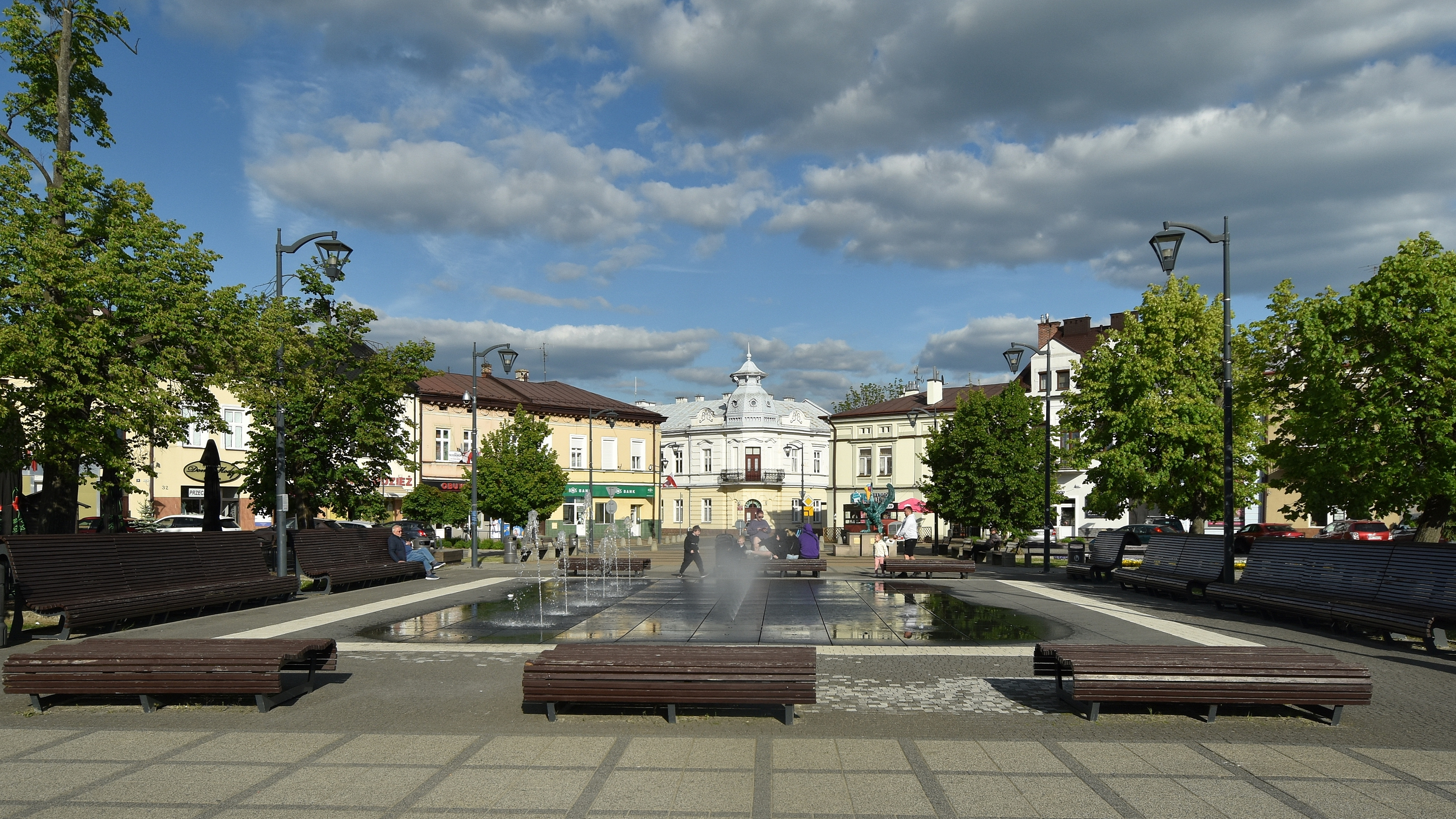
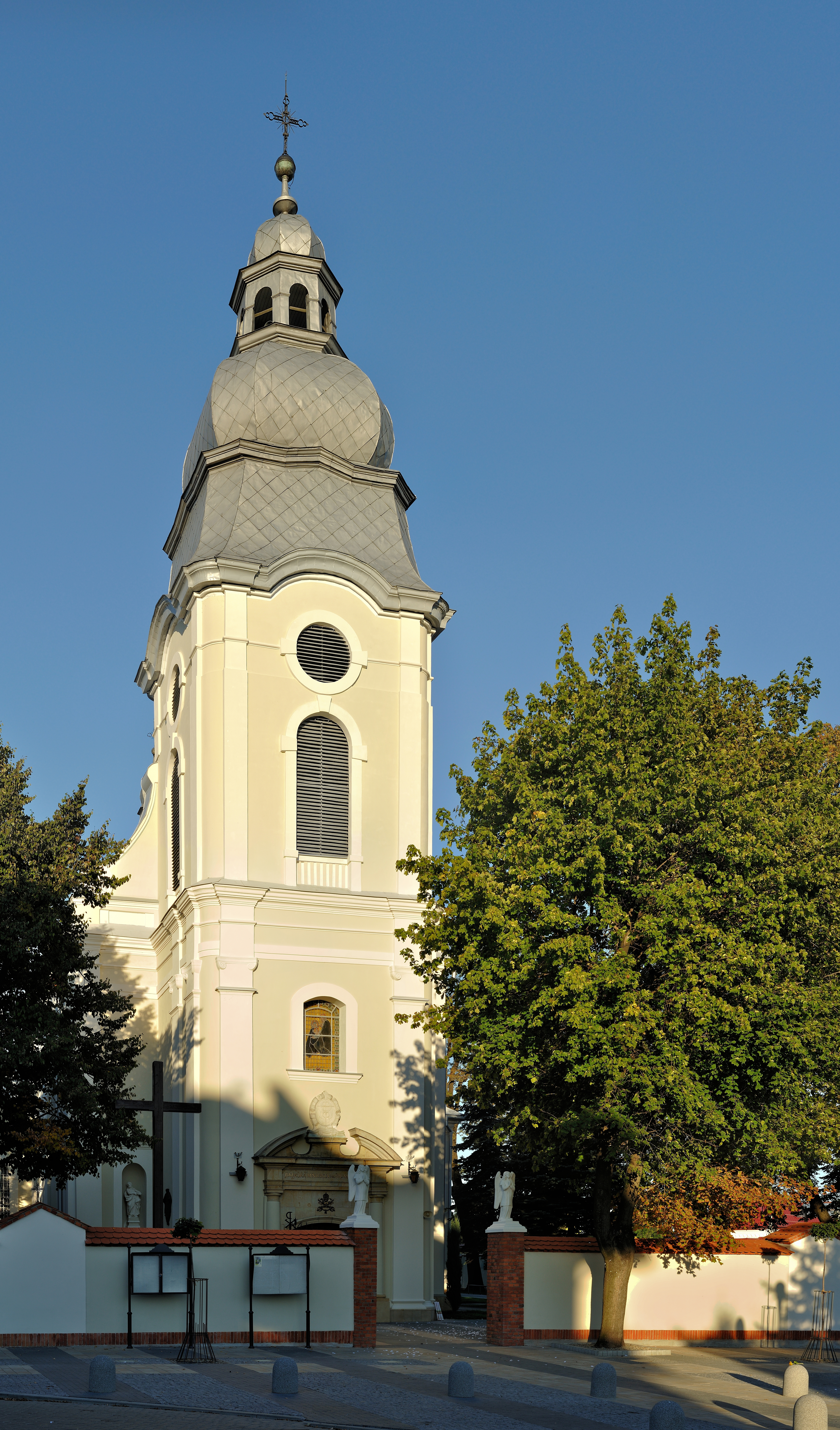
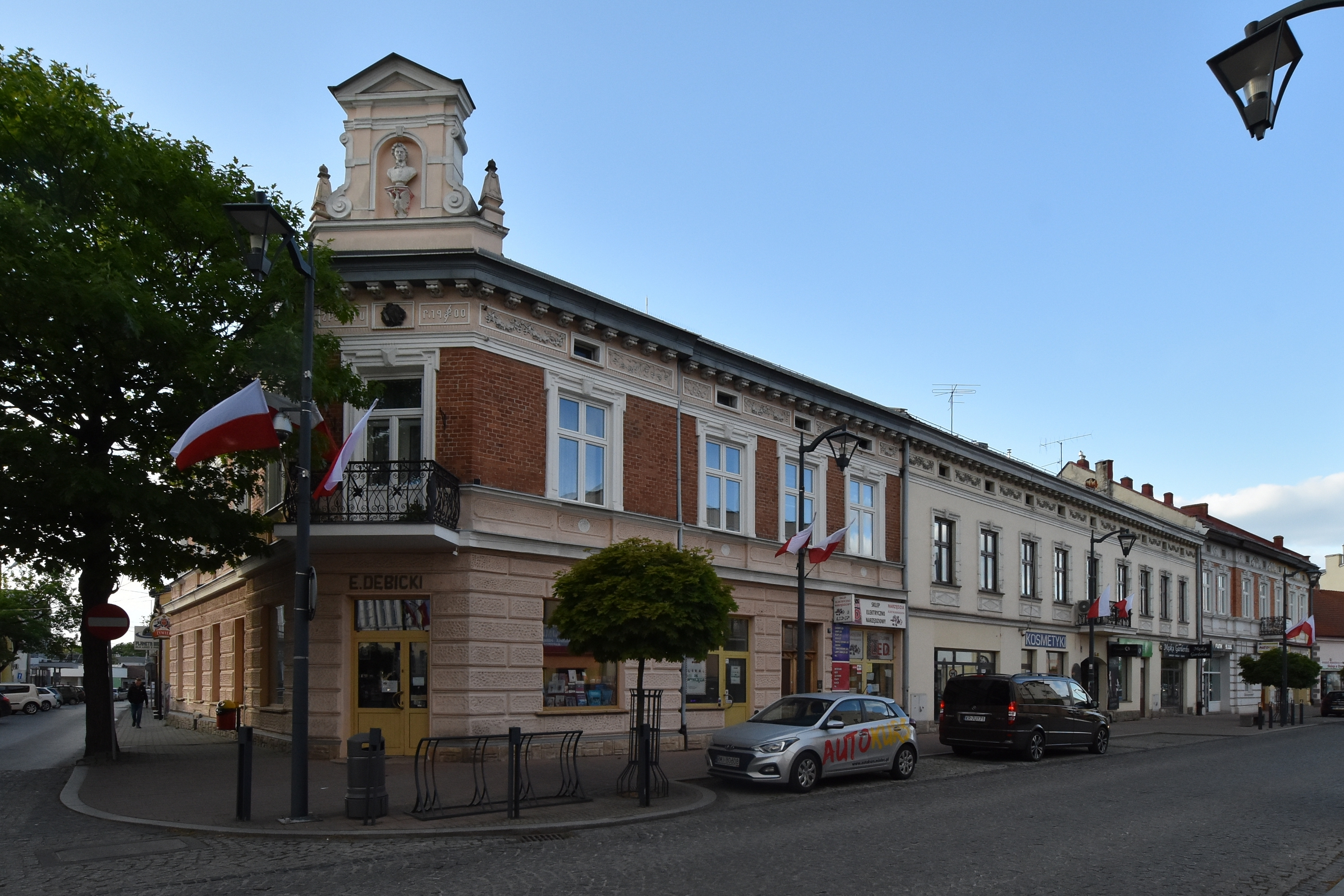
- Market Square Minor Basilica of St. Matthew Mickiewicz Street

- Flag Coat of arms

- Location within Poland
- Coordinates: 50°17′N 21°26′E
- Country: Poland
- Voivodeship: Subcarpathian
- County: Mielec
- Gmina: Mielec (urban gmina)
- First mentioned: 1229
- Town rights: 1470

Government
  - City mayor: Radosław Swół

Area
  - Total: 47.36 km^{2} (18.29 sq mi)

Population (31 December 2021)
  - Total: 59,509 ▼
  - Density: 1,257/km^{2} (3,254/sq mi)
- Time zone: UTC+1 (CET)
  - Summer (DST): UTC+2 (CEST)
- Postal code: 39-300 to 39-303, 39-323
- Area code: +48 17
- Car plates: RMI
- Website: http://www.mielec.pl

Mielec [ˈmʲɛlɛt͡s] (Note: Yiddish: מעליץ-Melitz) is the largest city and seat of Mielec County, located within the Subcarpathian Voivodeship in south-eastern Poland. The population of Mielec in December 2021 was 59,509.

Mielec is an industrial center, with technical and IT schools, craft schools and colleges (providing bachelor's degree and master's degree in several fields of study. Postgraduate studies are also available - e.g. MBA). The city lies within the Special Economic Zone Euro-Park Mielec with access to Mielec Airport and railway. About 15 km (9 mi) north of Mielec runs LHS railway - The transshipment terminal in Wola Baranowska enables the exchange of cargo between the broad gauge and standard gauge railways and trucks. About 20 km (12 mi) south of Mielec runs the A4 motorway. Moreover, the city of Mielec supports a recognizable football team, Stal Mielec, two times Polish Champions.

The motto of the city is Here wings spread! in reference to many successful domestic and foreign investments.

== History ==
=== Early history ===
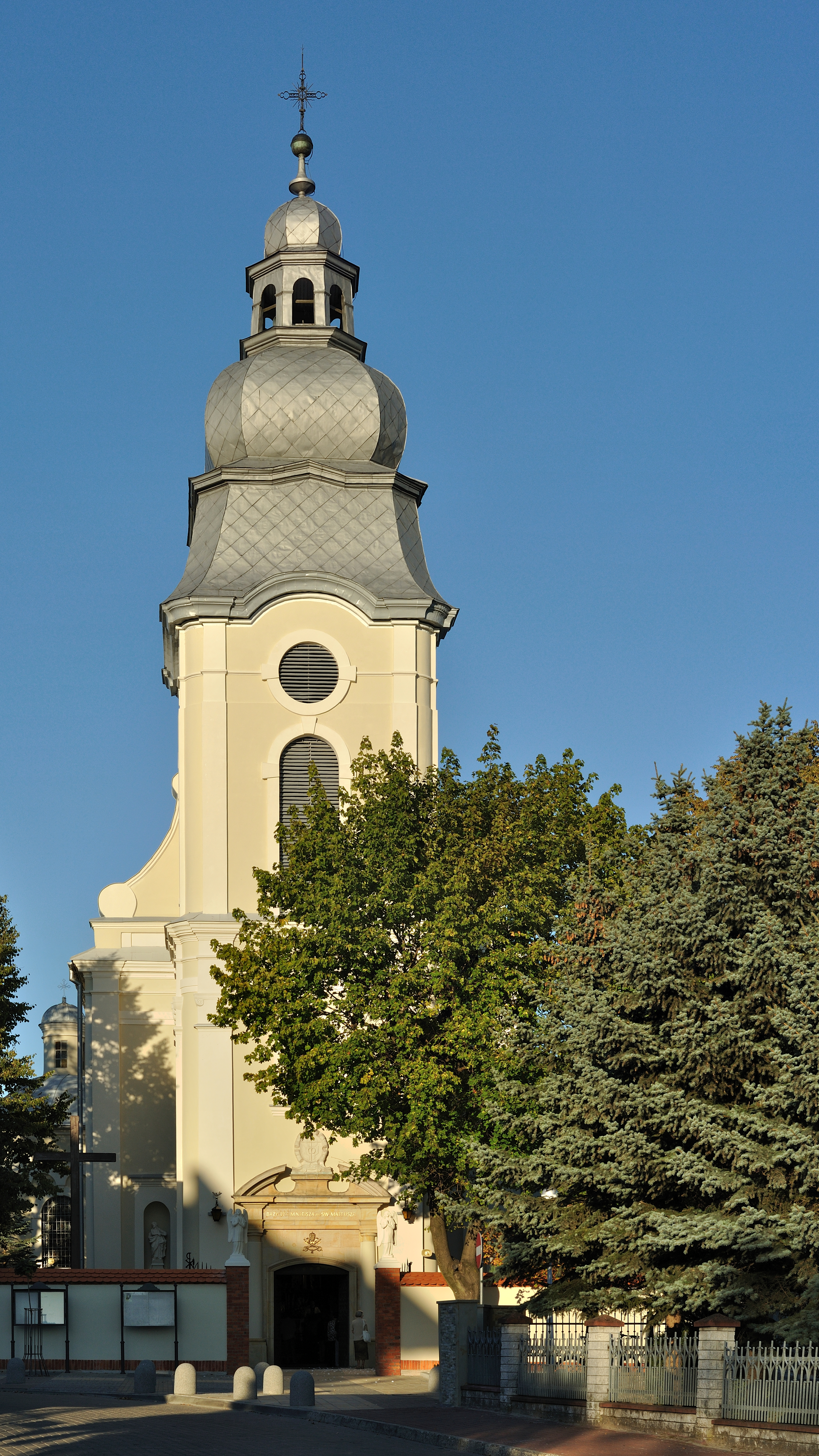
Baroque Minor Basilica of St. Matthew

The first mention of a place called Mielec occurs in the thirteenth century in the 1229 bull of Pope Gregory IX. In the second half of the fourteenth century, "Mielecka" was mentioned in a list of parishes. The city of Mielec, part of Sandomierz Voivodeship and Lesser Poland Province of the Kingdom of Poland, was founded on 17 March 1457, when King Casimir IV granted a charter to Jan Mielecki for the establishment of a city under the name of Nowy Targ. For unknown reasons Jan Mielecki did not go on to found the city; it was eventually established by his two sons, Jan and Bernardyn, by an Act of 18 December 1470. The Mielecki family owned the town of Mielec until the last of the Mieleckis died in 1771. Under their rule, there was intensive development of craft industries. In 1522, the first guild was founded. This was the blacksmiths' guild. It was followed by guilds of tailors, cobblers, potters, spinners, and weavers.

The next owners of Mielec were the Ossolinski and Morsztyn families. In 1775, Anna Ossilińska married Jan Pieniążek, bringing as a dowry her share of part of the city. The next owner was Ignacy Suchorzewski, who married Pieniążek's daughter Paulina. Suchorzewski sold Mielec's property to Ludwik Starzeński in 1847, who then disposed of it ten years later to a Jewish family named Gross. The last owner of Mielec was the Oborski family in 1891.

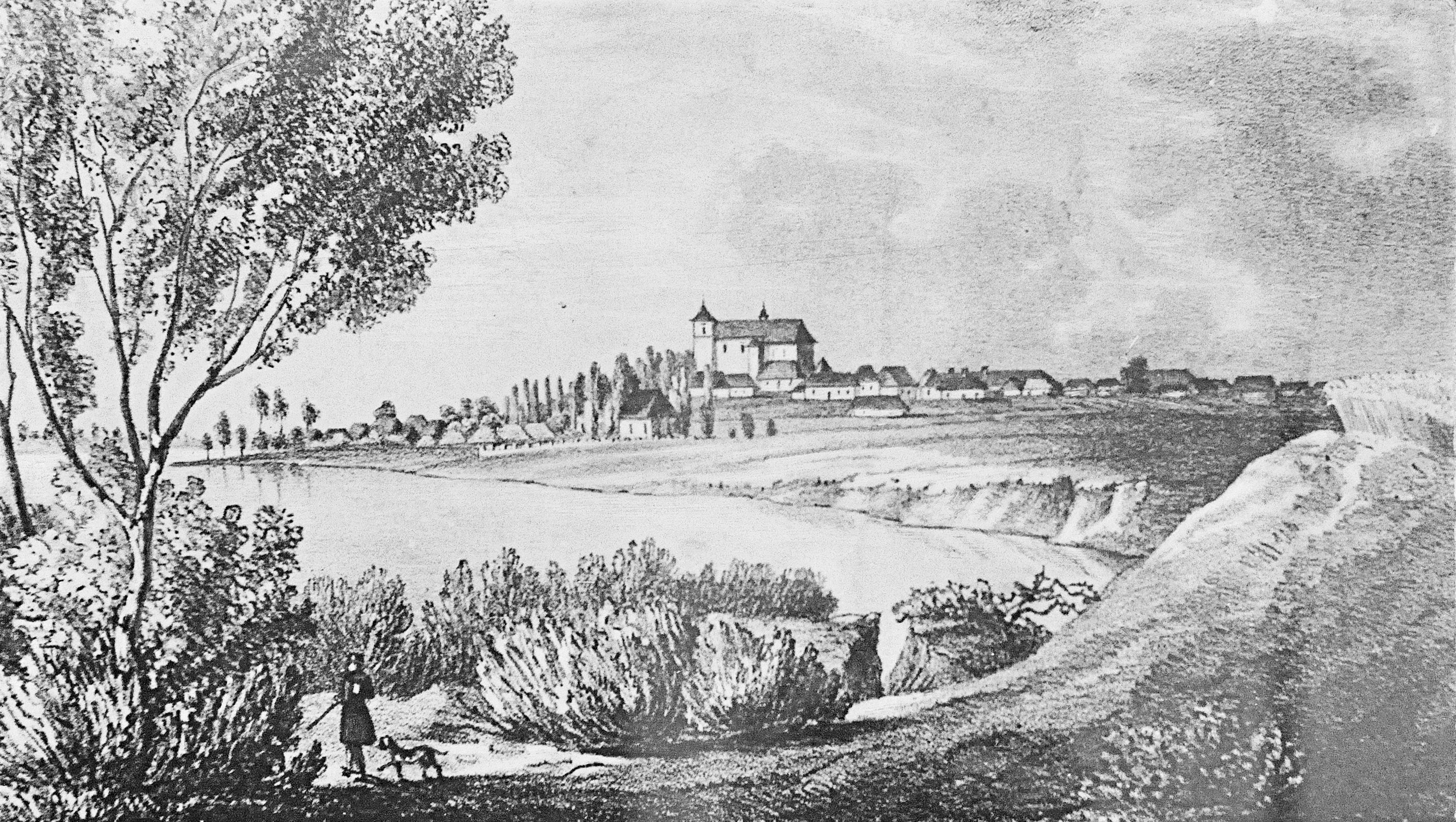
Mielec in 1847 by Maciej Bogusz Stęczyński

In 1853, the county town of Mielec governed an area in which there were 106 settlements and 91 castral municipalities. In 1892, on Kosciuszko Street a new City Council building and police barracks were built. The development of the county town was interrupted by a huge fire, which destroyed three quarters of the city. This catastrophe caused the city to apply for a state loan of 12 crowns, the receipt of which led to the rapid development of the city. By the beginning of the twentieth century, the market place in Mielec was surrounded by brick houses, and in 1902, a courthouse was built. In 1912, a gymnasium (or academic high school) and the office of County Council were established and buildings constructed to house them.

World War I caused much damage to the infrastructure and economy of city of Mielec and the county.

=== Interwar period ===
Mielec in the 1930s

In the interwar years many streets were paved with cobbles. In addition, a private power plant, various craft workshops, and retail businesses were established. In 1934, the Mielec region suffered a huge flood that destroyed more than 11,000 households. The house and photographic studio of the early 20th-century Polish photographer August Jaderny was a meeting place of the local artistic community in the interbellum.

Mielec's economy has been based for the last 70 years around a single industrial enterprise, which transformed the city and increased its population sixfold. This process began in the 1930s, when Poland launched a significant expansion of its armaments industry, focused on building factories in the newly created Central Industrial Region (Polish: Centralny Okręg Przemysłowy, abbreviated COP). In 1936, a state-owned factory making airplane chassis was established (State Aviation Works - Airframe Fakcory No. 2) on the outskirts of the town, an area then known as Cyranka. The factory started to build a new bomber, the PZL P-37 or "Łoś" (English: "Moose"). Additionally, in the years 1937-1939 a large aviation factory belonging to the PZL company was set up. This new manufacturing industry necessitated the development of residential housing for factory workers and management personnel.

=== World War II and the Holocaust ===
On the eve of World War II there were approximately 3,500 Jews living in Mielec, out of a total population of 7,000 (roughly 50%).

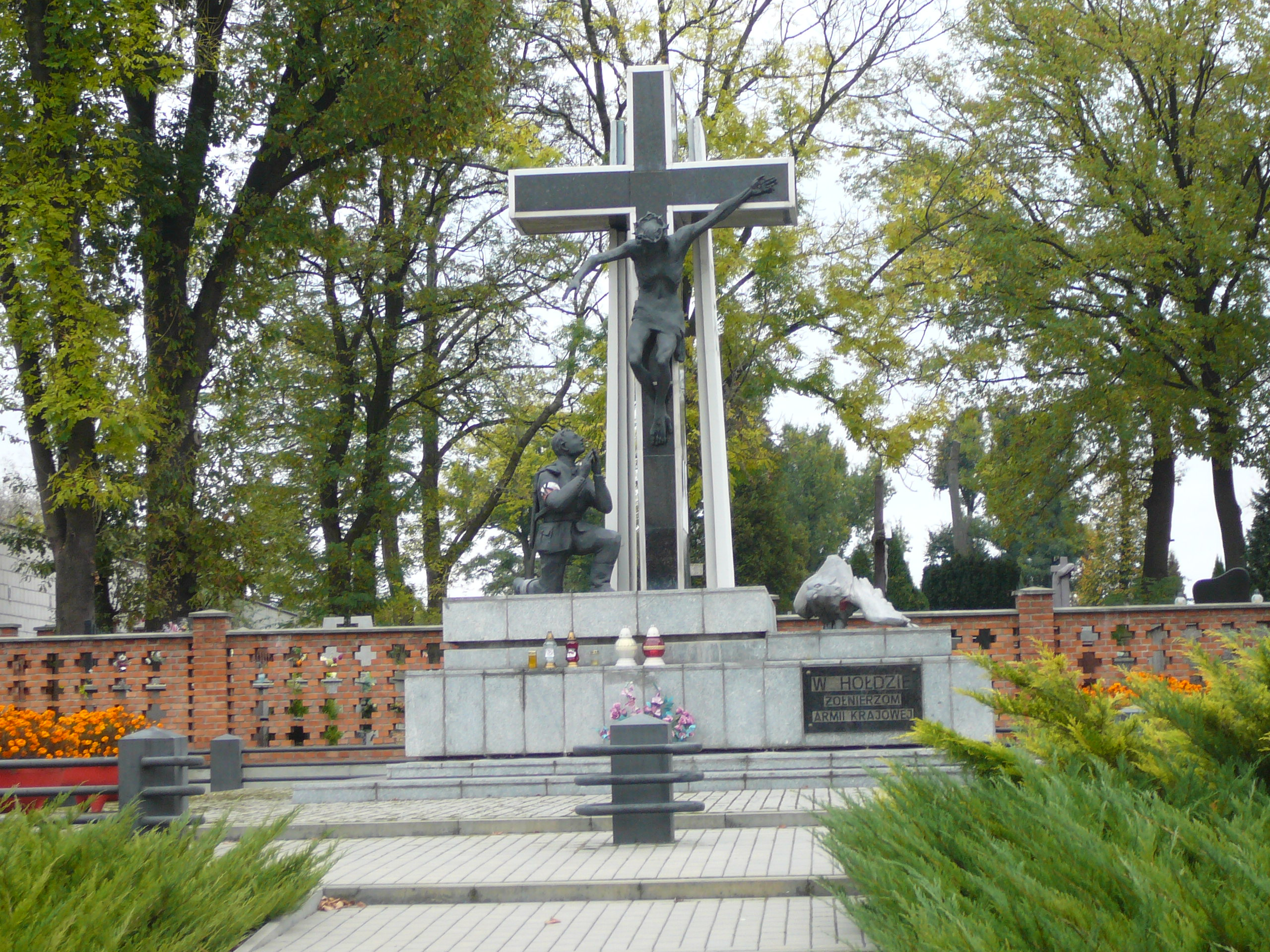
Home Army monument

After the outbreak of World War II, the city fell into the hands of the German invaders. The period of German occupation lasted from 13 September 1939 to 6 August 1944 in Mielec.

One of the first things that the Germans did upon occupying the city was to burn down the Jewish synagogue, mikveh and kosher slaughterhouse, on the eve of Rosh Hashanah, one of the holiest holidays, killing between 30 - 150 Jews who were in the buildings at the time. It is hard to find accurate numbers as many were visitors for the holiday and were not from Mielec.

The Polish underground resistance was quickly organized in Mielec, and already on 29 November 1939, it launched an attack on a German prison. The Polish resistance movement had important centers in the former house of photographer August Jaderny and in the house of the Dębicki family. On March 29, 1943, a Polish underground partisan unit Jędrusie and the Home Army successfully carried out a daring attack on a German prison and liberated about 180 prisoners.

In the years of 1939–1944, the airplane factory produced German bombers, and from 1943 also manufactured the fighter plane He–297. The Nazis staffed much of the factory with slave labour. Initially, Jews from Mielec were enslaved in this forced labor camp. In 1942, the Jewish population of Mielec was deported to death camps, except for a few who remained as slave labour at the factory. During the deportation, the factory hangars were the site of a mass murder of several hundred of Mielec's Jews, who were buried there. Subsequently, the factory used slave labour composed of Jews from other regions, prisoners of war, political prisoners, etc. The Gestapo used Jewish informants, the so-called V-leute in region to penetrate underground resistance and denounce hiding Jews; special barracks were set up in labour camp near Mielec for Jewish informers and their families, who were granted special privileges. These informants operated between 1942 and 1943 when they were finally executed by Gestapo themselves. A mass grave of Jews with a monument may be found in one corner of the Mielec Catholic cemetery, where the victims of a 1941 Nazi atrocity were buried. During the German occupation, all of Mielec's Jewish institutions and the Jewish cemetery were destroyed, and also many of the Jewish homes. Estimates on the number of Jewish survivors from Mielec are around 300, down from almost 3,000 six years prior. Of the 300 survivors, 183 returned to Mielec to try and live there, but found their homes taken over by Poles, and following a pogrom by their neighbors on August 25, 1946, they fled. By the end of 1946 only 20 Jews remained in Mielec.

=== Recent history ===
After 1945, the factory became the largest aviation factory in Poland under the name WSK-Mielec "Wytwórnia Sprzętu Komunikacyjnego" (English: "Transport Equipment Manufacturing Centre"). This plant was the main source of employment for people in Mielec and surrounding communities. At first, the factory produced Soviet-designed planes under license. Thus, it was the primary production site of the widely used An-2 transport plane. It also manufactured Polish versions of the MiG-15 and MiG-17 fighters. The factory also built planes designed in Poland such as the trainer plane TS-11 Iskra used by Poland and India. It produced over 16,000 aircraft, which were mainly licensed for export to the USSR.

After 1989 and the economic changes due to the fall of communism, factory orders declined and the plant encountered serious financial difficulties. It continued to produce successful aircraft types, but at much lower volumes than during the Cold War. Self-government of Mielec Township was established in 1990.

The situation changed in 1995, due to the establishment of Poland's first Special Economic Zone EURO-PARK Mielec. In 1998 the aviation plant changed its name to PZL-Mielec "Polskie Zakłady Lotnicze" (English: "Polish Aviation Works"). In 2007 the factory was acquired by Sikorsky (in 2015 Sikorsky was acquired by Lockheed Martin), and was planned to be the main production site of the export version UH-60 Black Hawk helicopter. Additionally, Mielec has been the production site of the sports-luxury car Leopard 6 Litre Roadster.

== Historic sites ==
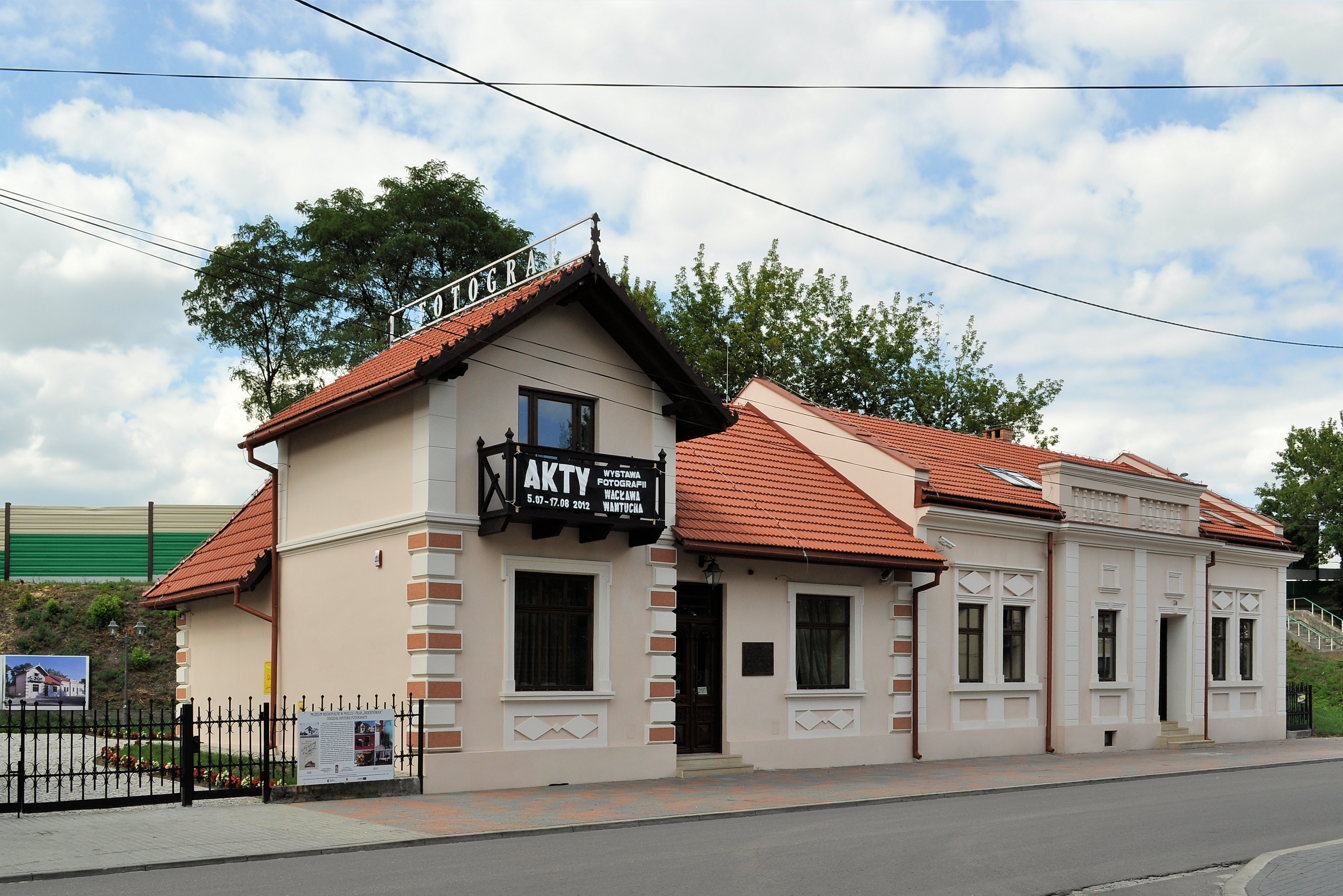
Museum of the History of Photography

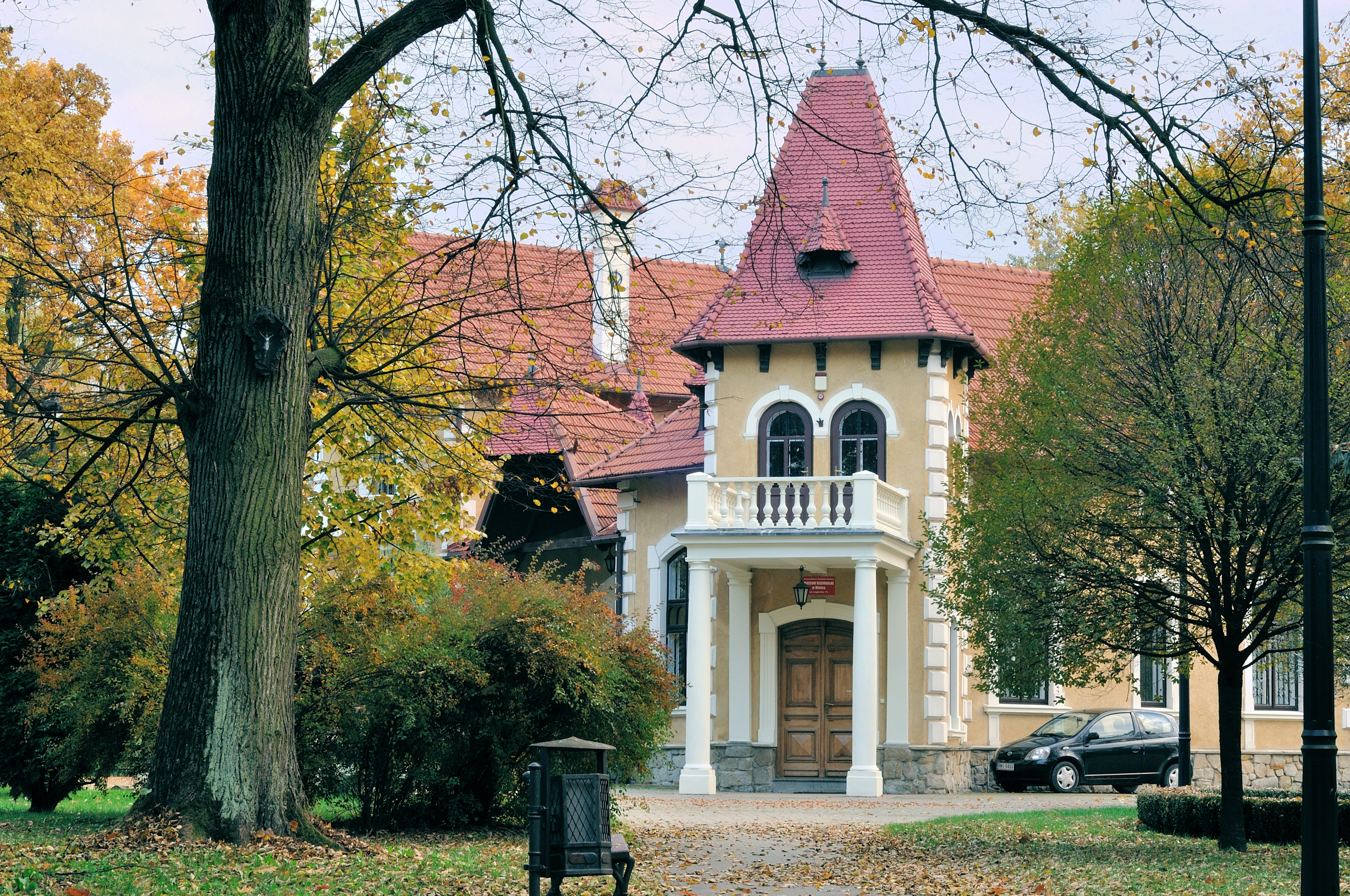
Oborski Mansion, Regional Museum

Municipal Public Library

Saint Mark's Church

- Baroque Minor Basilica of Matthew the Evangelist;
- The Oborski family manor-house from the 17th century, now housing the Regional Museum (Muzeum Regionalne);
- The Jaderny house (Jadernówka), former house and photographic studio of the early 20th-century Polish photographer August Jaderny, meeting point of the Polish underground resistance movement during World War II, now housing the Museum of the History of Photography;
- The Dębicki house with a bust of Tadeusz Kościuszko, hero of Polish and American independence fights, also a focal point of the Polish underground resistance movement during World War II;
- Courthouse, site of an operation in which Polish partisans liberated 180 prisoners from the Germans in March 1943, during World War II;
- Baroque St. Mark's church;
- Musical School;
- Historic townhouses, villas, etc.;
- Numerous memorials, including multiple World War II memorials.

== Economy ==
From the beginning of Centralny Okręg Przemysłowy, Mielec is commonly associated with PZL Mielec aviation factory.

The first Special Economic Zone in Poland, SEZ EURO-PARK MIELEC, has been founded in Mielec in 1995 and has a positive impact on the economy of Mielec. In 2020 Mielec is close to enlarging the zone of SEZ EURO-PARK MIELEC

Other products manufactured in the city:

- consumer electronics
- furniture
- metal and electrotechnical components for the automotive industry
- other components for the production of cars
- golf carts
- tempered glass
- handmade bicycle frames
- Geyer & Hosaja retread tires
- Husqvarna petrol lawn mowers
- Fakro roof windows
- PVC windows
- styrofoam
- chipboard, MDF, floor panels, countertops
- Cobi blocks for kids
- AUTOPART starter batteries
- Froneri ice cream
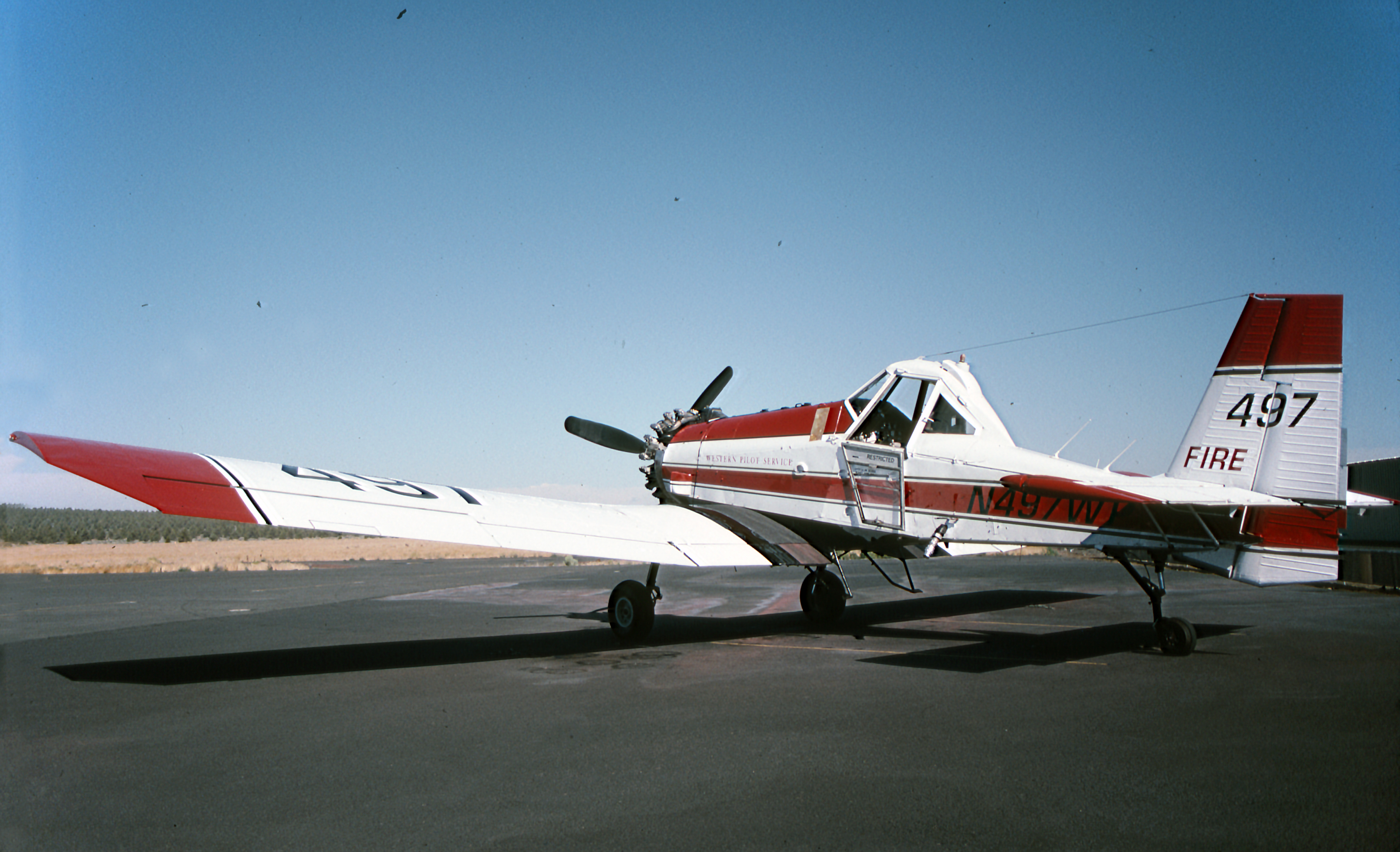
Dromader PZL Mielec

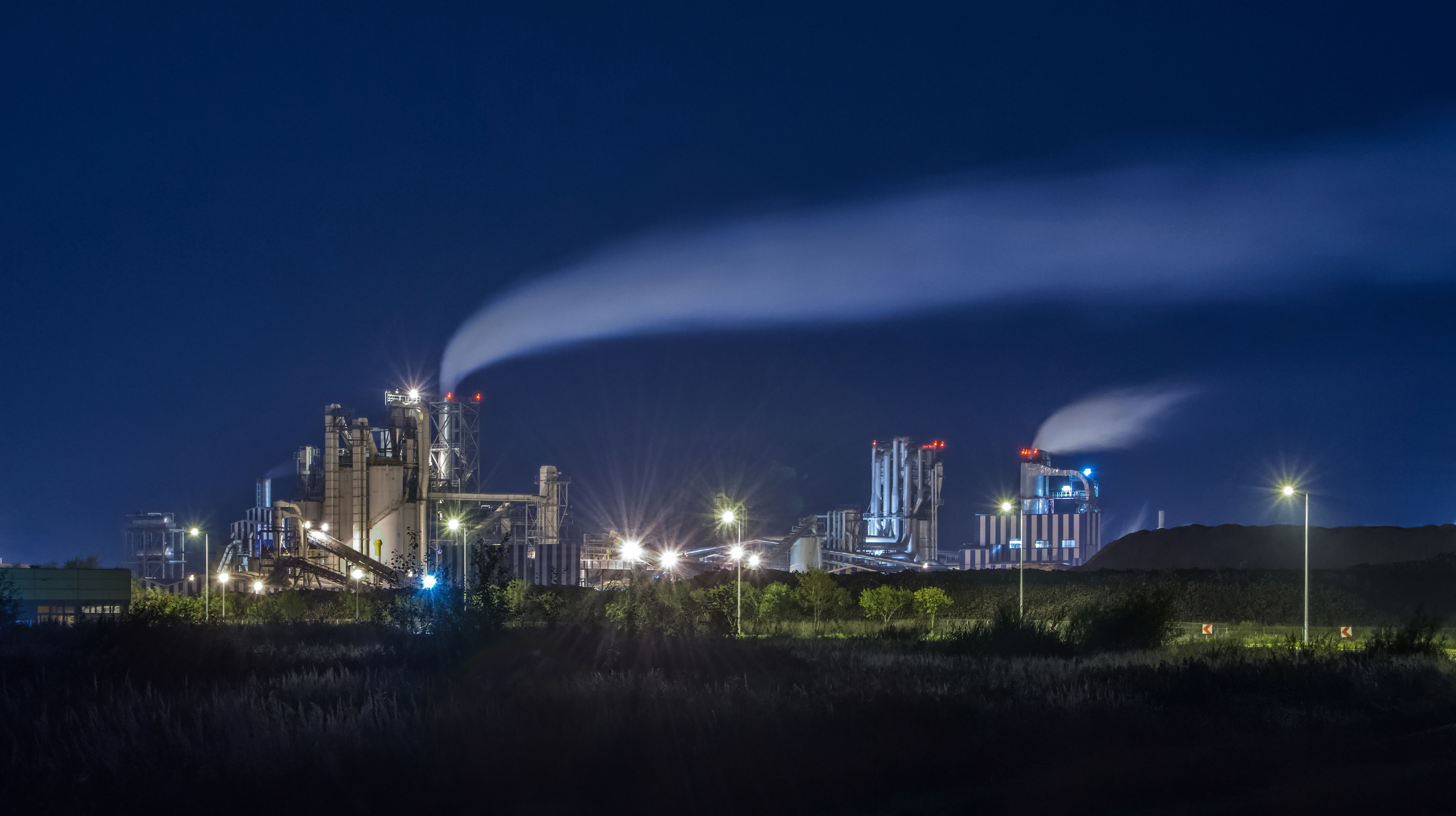
Kronospan factory

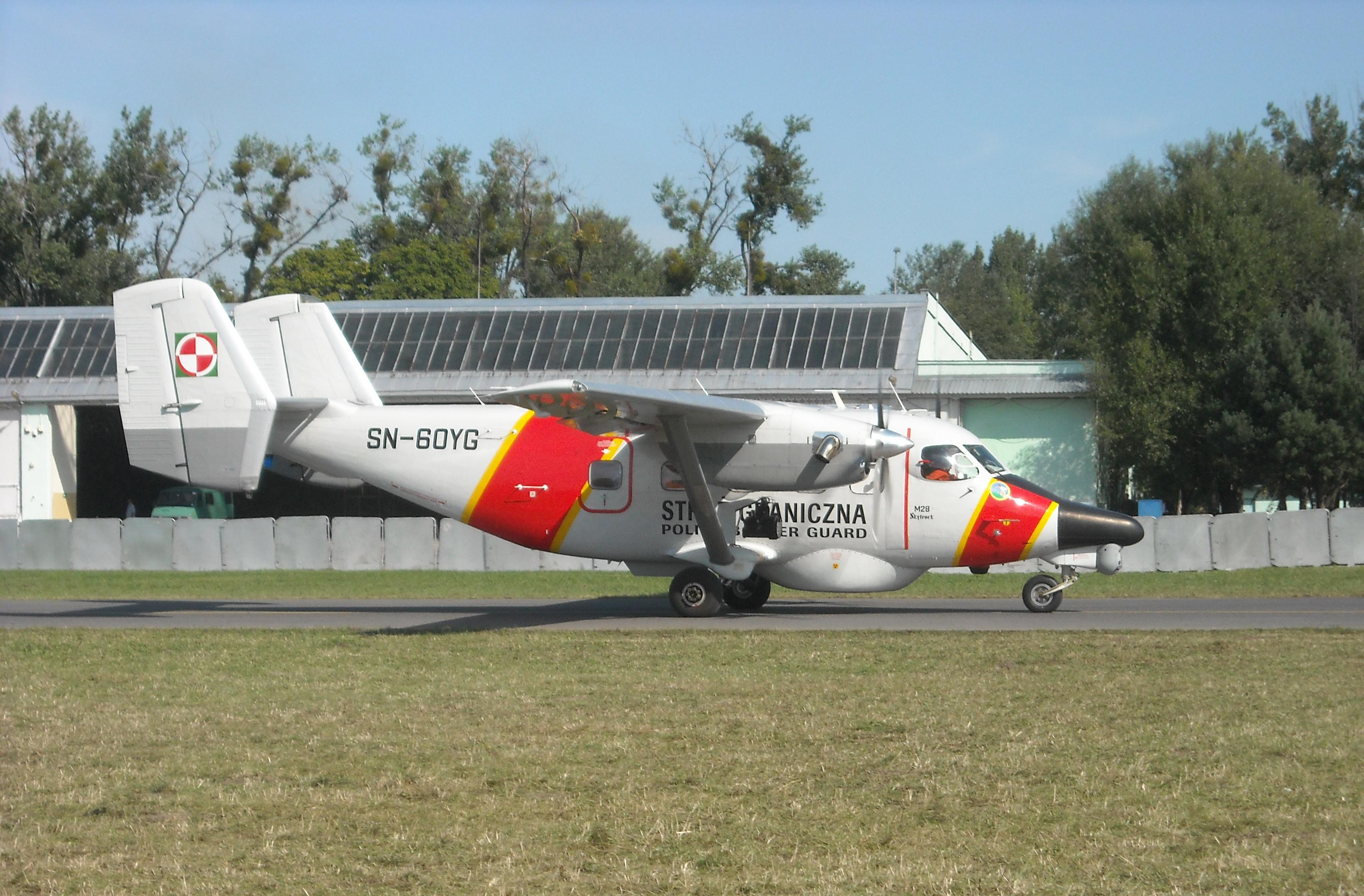
PZL M28, produced in Mielec

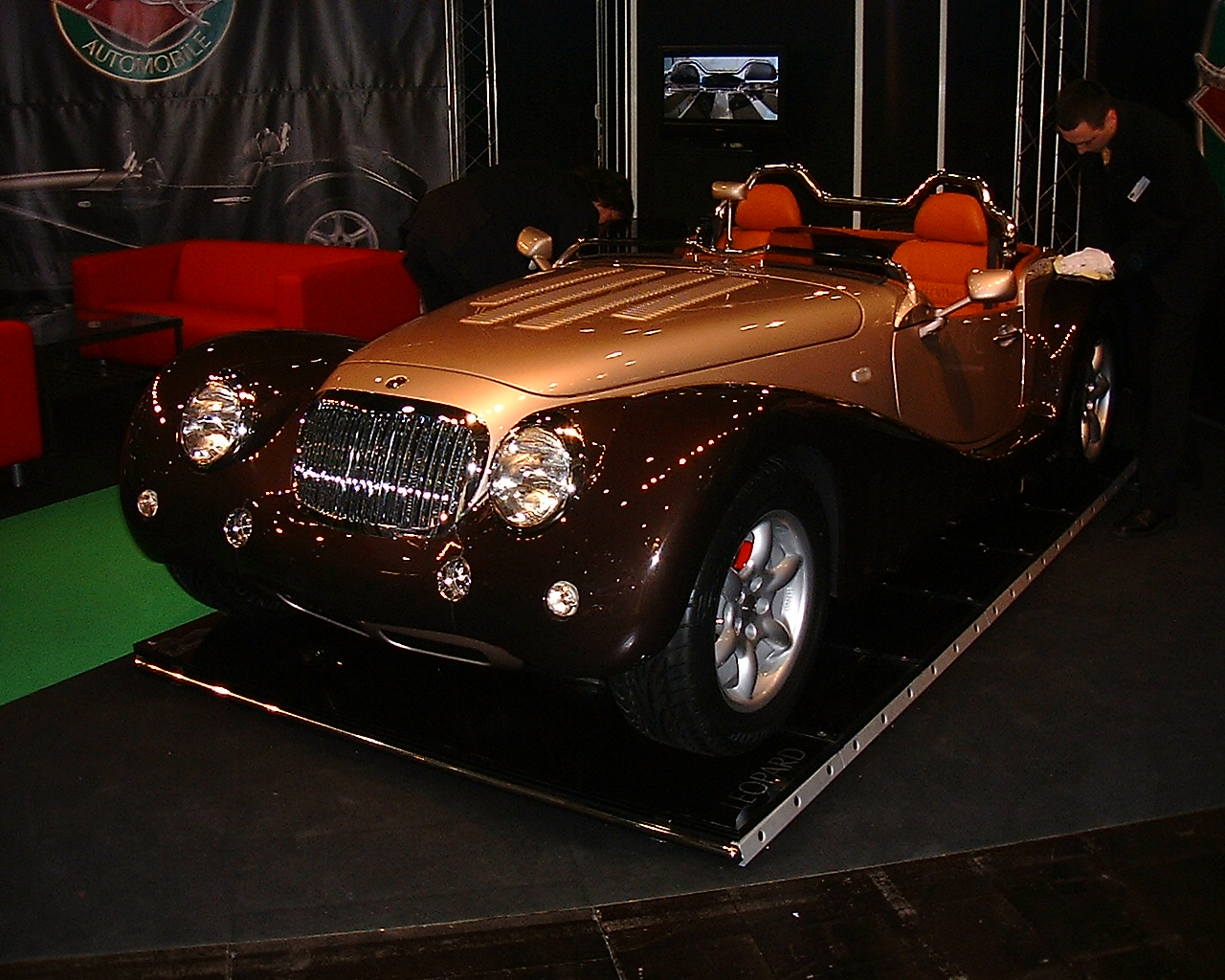
Leopard 6 Litre Roadster, produced in Mielec

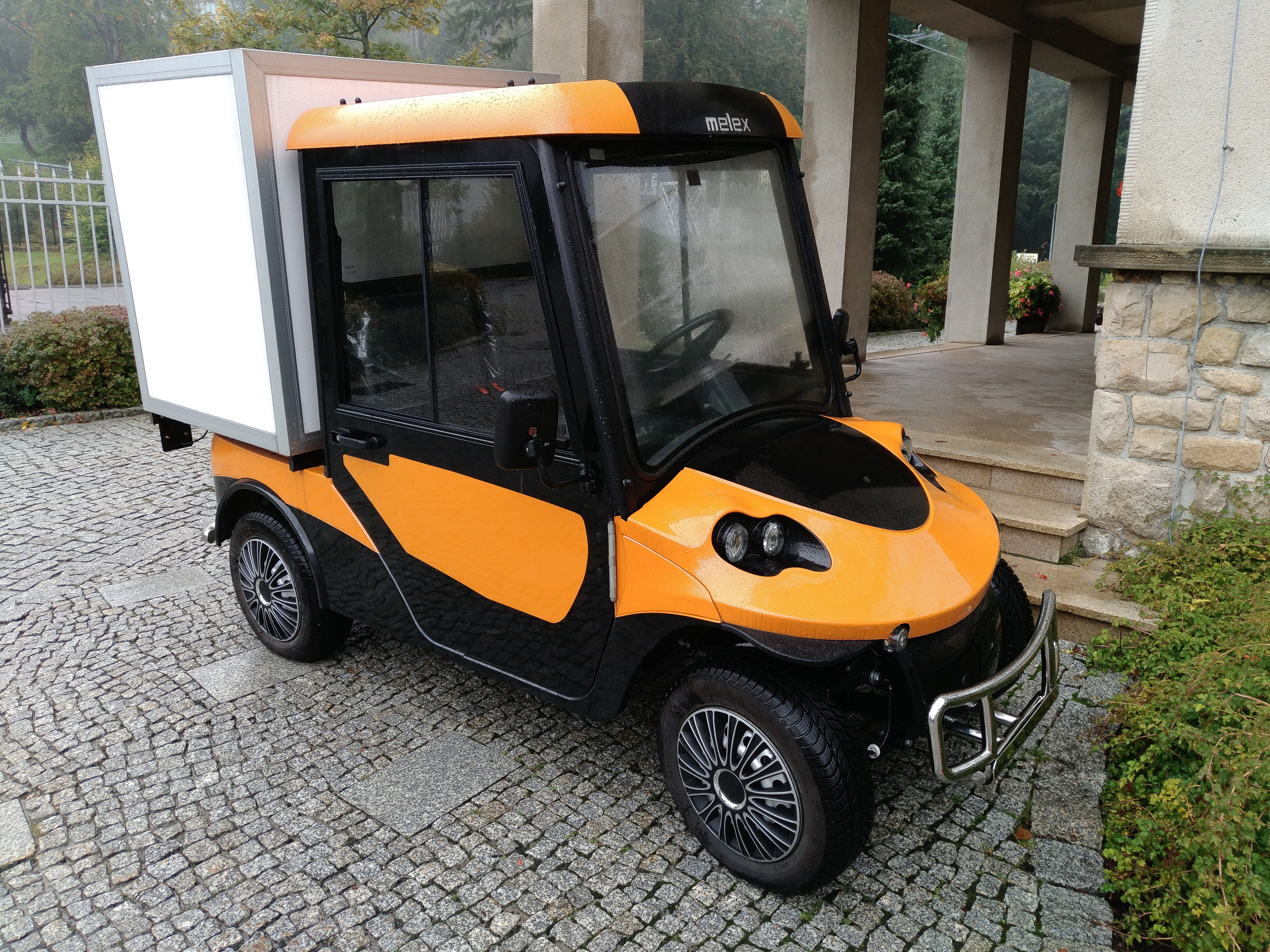
Melex cart

== Climate ==
Mielec has warm summers, cold winters and a wide but not extreme variation in temperature between seasons. In the Köppen climate classification, Mielec is on the border between a humid continental climate (Dfb) if the 0 °C (32 °F) isotherm is used or an oceanic climate (Cfb) if the −3 °C (27 °F) isotherm is used. There is rain or snow in all months of the year.

== Demographics ==
Historical population

Year	Pop.	±%
1950	9,205	—
1960	22,132	+140.4%
1970	27,000	+22.0%
1980	43,143	+59.8%

Year	Pop.	±%
1990	61,847	+43.4%
2000	64,246	+3.9%
2010	60,743	−5.5%
2020	60,075	−1.1%

Source: GUS, in particular:
- "Roczniki statystyczne GUS" (years 1939–1979)
- "Roczniki demograficzne GUS" (years 1980–1994)
- Bank danych lokalnych GUS (years 1995–2010)
- Population. Size and structure and vital statistics in Poland by territorial division. As of December 31, 2020 (year 2020)

== Sports ==
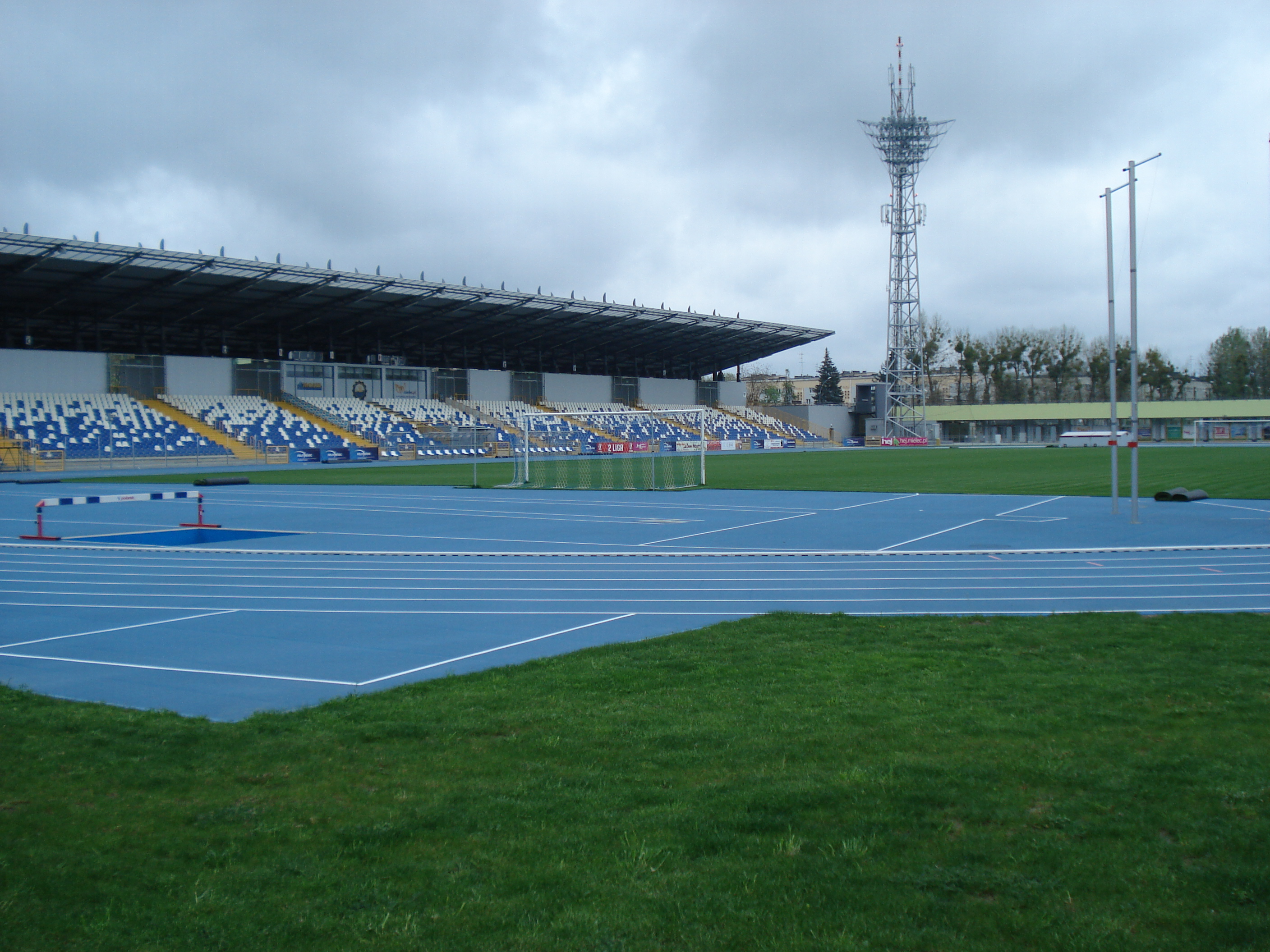
Grzegorz Lato Municipal Stadium, stadium of the Stal Mielec football team

- FKS Stal Mielec – men's football team, two times Polish champions: 1972–73, 1975–76, and 1974–75 runners-up.
  - Polish Cup: finalist in 1976 season
  - UEFA Cup: quarter-finalist in 1975/76 season
  - European Champions Cup: first round elimination in 1973/74 season; first round elimination in 1976/77 season
  - Notable players: Grzegorz Lato, Henryk Kasperczak, Andrzej Szarmach, Jan Domarski
- KPSK Stal Mielec - women's volleyball, team went bankrupt: 2nd place in 1999/2000 season, 3rd place in 1991/1992, 1993/1994, 1998/1999, 2003/2004 seasons.
- SPR Stal Mielec – men's handball team playing in PGNiG Superliga: 2nd place in 1974/45 season; 3rd place in 2011/12 season.

== Education ==
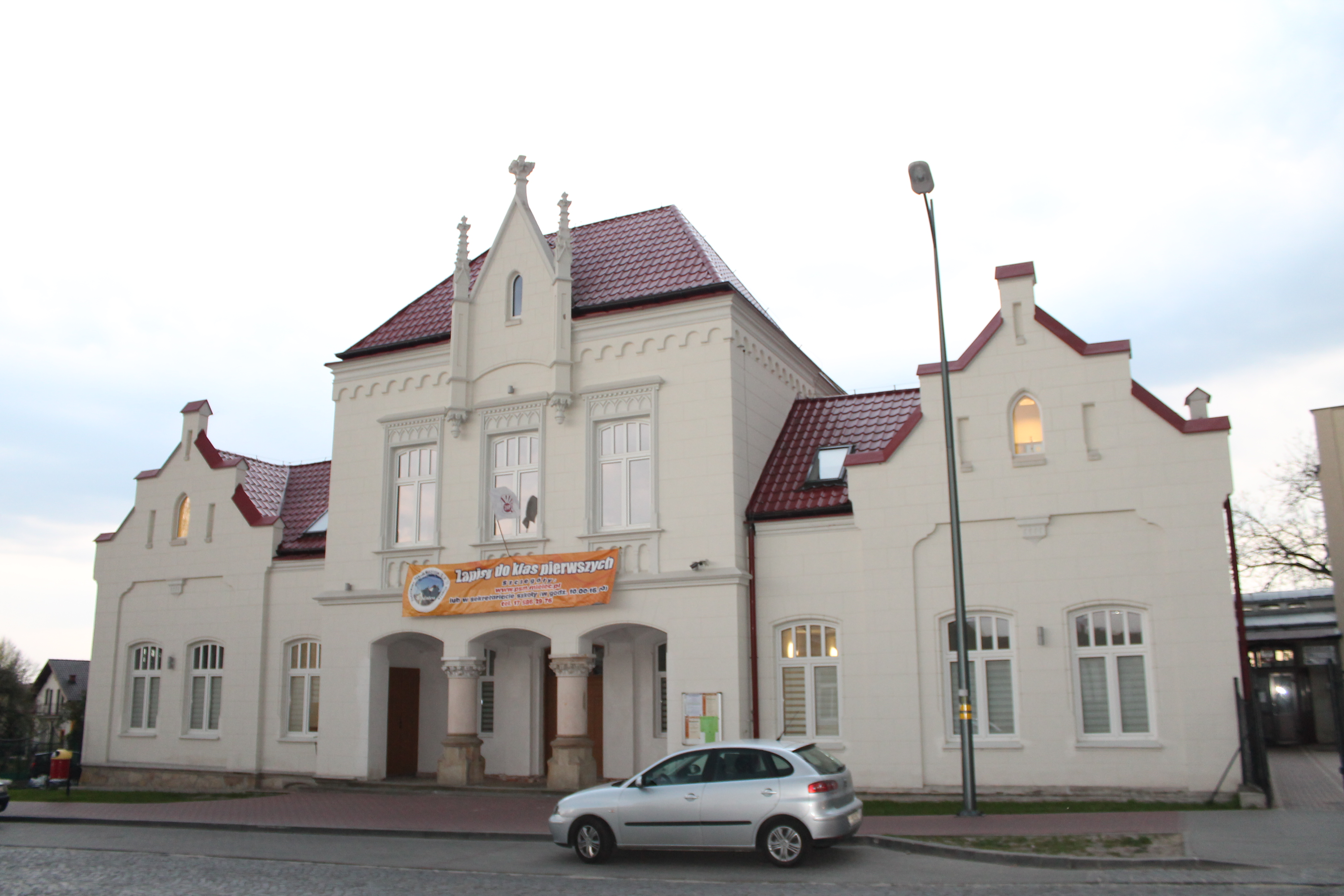
Music school

Elementary schools

- Szkoła Podstawowa nr 1 im. Władysława Szafera w Mielcu
- Szkoła Podstawowa nr 2 im. Tadeusza Kościuszki w Mielcu
- Szkoła Podstawowa nr 3 im. Wojska Polskiego w Mielcu
- Szkoła Podstawowa nr 6 im. Żwirki i Wigury w Mielcu
- Szkoła Podstawowa nr 7 im. Ignacego Łukasiewicza w Mielcu
- Szkoła Podstawowa nr 8 z Oddziałami Integracyjnymi w Mielcu
- Szkoła Podstawowa nr 9 im. Władysława Jasińskiego "Jędrusia" w Mielcu
- Szkoła Podstawowa nr 11 im. Jana Pawła II w Mielcu
- Szkoła Podstawowa nr 12 im. Henryka Sienkiewicza w Mielcu
- Szkoła Podstawowa nr 13 im. Jana Bytnara "Rudego" w Mielcu
- Szkoła Podstawowa przy Niepublicznej Szkole Mistrzostwa Sportowego w Mielcu im. Grzegorza Lato

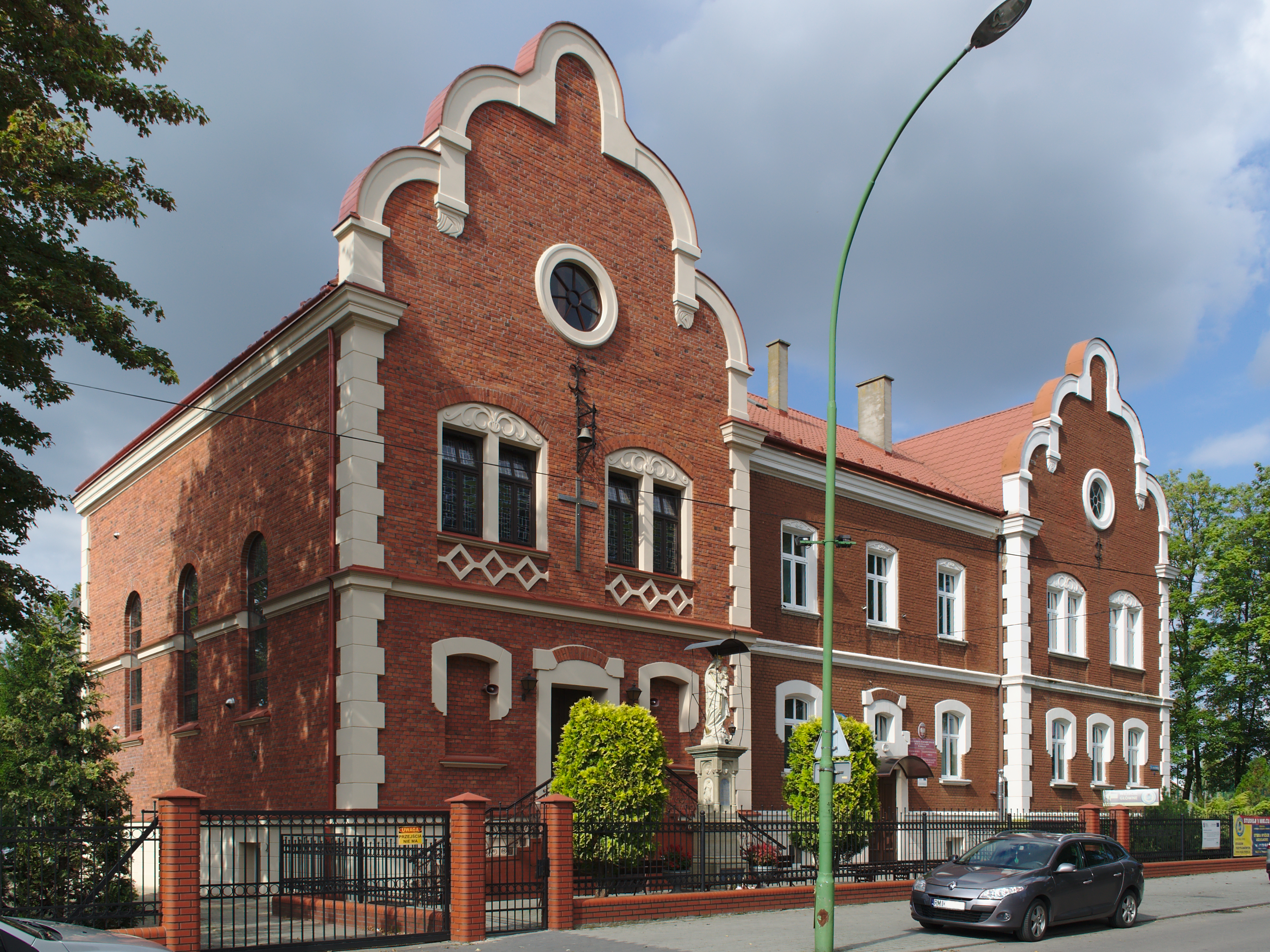
Zespół Szkół Ekonomicznych

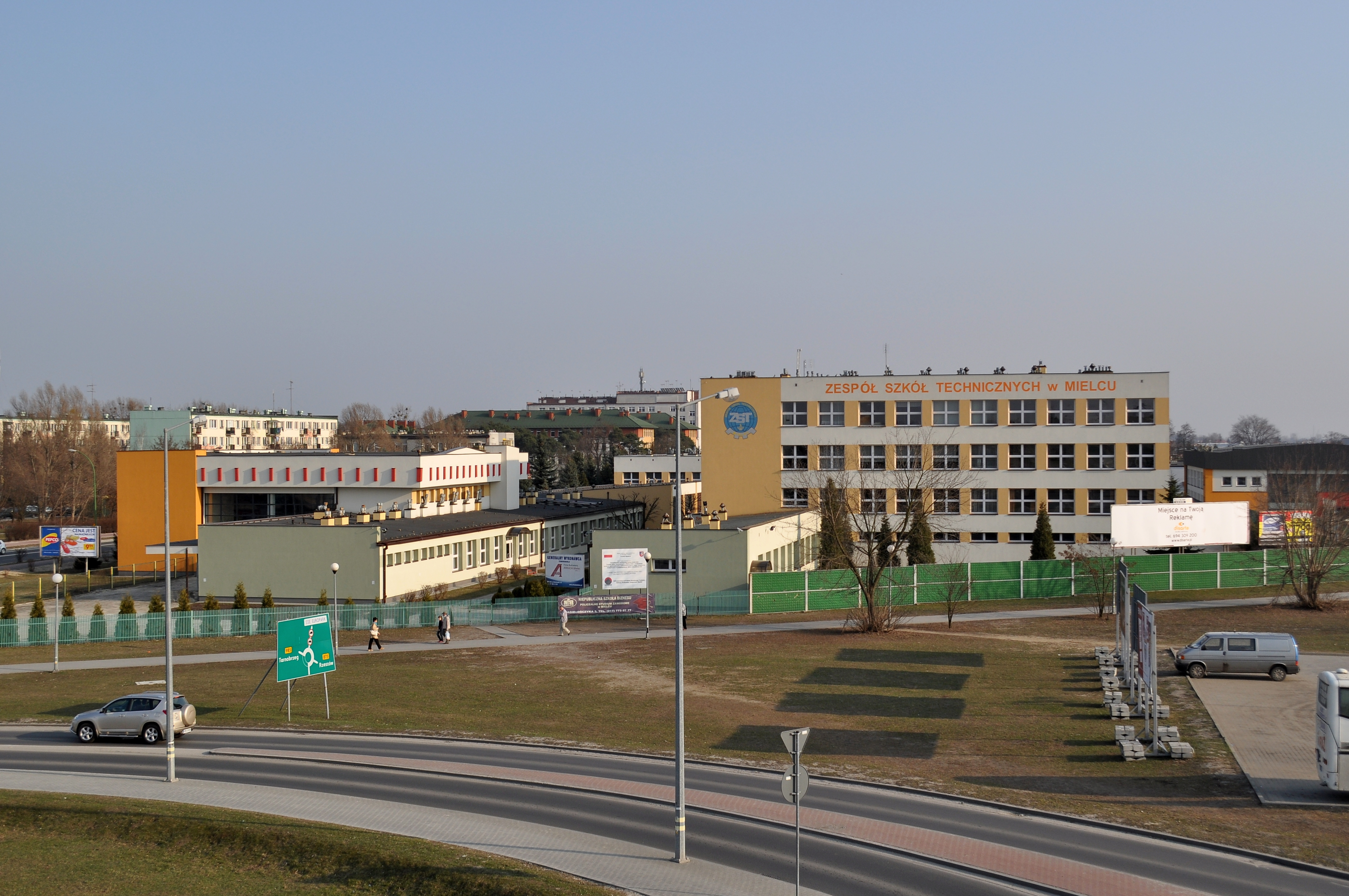
Zespół Szkół Technicznych

High Schools and Vo-Tech Schools

- I Liceum Ogólnokształcące im. Stanisława Konarskiego w Mielcu
- II Liceum Ogólnokształcące im. Mikołaja Kopernika w Mielcu
- Zespół Szkół Ogólnokształcących nr 1 w Mielcu im. st. sierż. pilota Stanisława Działowskiego
  - V Liceum Ogólnokształcące
- Liceum przy Niepublicznej Szkole Mistrzostwa Sportowego w Mielcu im. Grzegorza Lato
- Zespół Szkół Budowlanych im. Żołnierzy Armii Krajowej w Mielcu
  - Zasadnicza Szkoła Zawodowa Nr 2
  - Technikum Nr 2
  - II Liceum Profilowane
- Zespół Szkół Ekonomicznych w Mielcu
  - Zasadnicza Szkoła Zawodowa Nr 1
  - Technikum Nr 1
  - I Liceum Profilowane
- Zespół Szkół Technicznych w Mielcu
  - Zasadnicza Szkoła Zawodowa Nr 3
  - Technikum Nr 3
  - III Liceum Profilowane
  - III Liceum Ogólnokształcące
  - Szkoła Policealna Nr 3
  - Technikum Uzupełniające Nr 3
  - III Uzupełniające Liceum Ogólnokształcące
- Zespół Szkół im. prof. Janusza Groszkowskiego w Mielcu
  - Zasadnicza Szkoła Zawodowa Nr 4
  - Technikum Nr 4
  - IV Liceum Profilowane
  - IV Liceum Ogólnokształcące

Colleges and universities

- Wyższa Szkoła Gospodarki i Zarządzania
- Nauczycielskie Kolegium Języków Obcych (UMCS patronage)

== Notable people ==
- Grzegorz Lato (born 1950), Polish football player, World Cup 1974 top goalscorer, senator, former president of the Polish Football Association
- Nate Mack (1891–1965), American banker, born in Mielec, co-founder of the Bank of Las Vegas.
- Kamil Rado (born 1990), Polish footballer
- Andrzej Rżany (born 1973), Polish boxer
- Józef Stala (born 1966), Polish Catholic priest, theologian, and philosopher
- Władysław Szafer (1886–1970), Polish biologist
- Simon Gwozdz (born 1991), Polish-Singaporean aerospace entrepreneur, founder of Equatorial Space Systems

== International relations ==
=== Twin Towns - Sister Cities ===
Mielec is twinned with:

Douchy-les-Mines in France (since 11 November 1990); Mukacheve in Ukraine (since January 1993); Vila Nova de Poiares in Portugal (since June 2001)	Löhne in Germany (since 15 July 2002); Tiszaföldvár in Hungary (since 11 August 2006)

== See also ==
- Stal Mielec
- Mielec Airport
- Mielec forced labor camp (German occupation)
- Mielecki family
