= Głogów Małopolski =

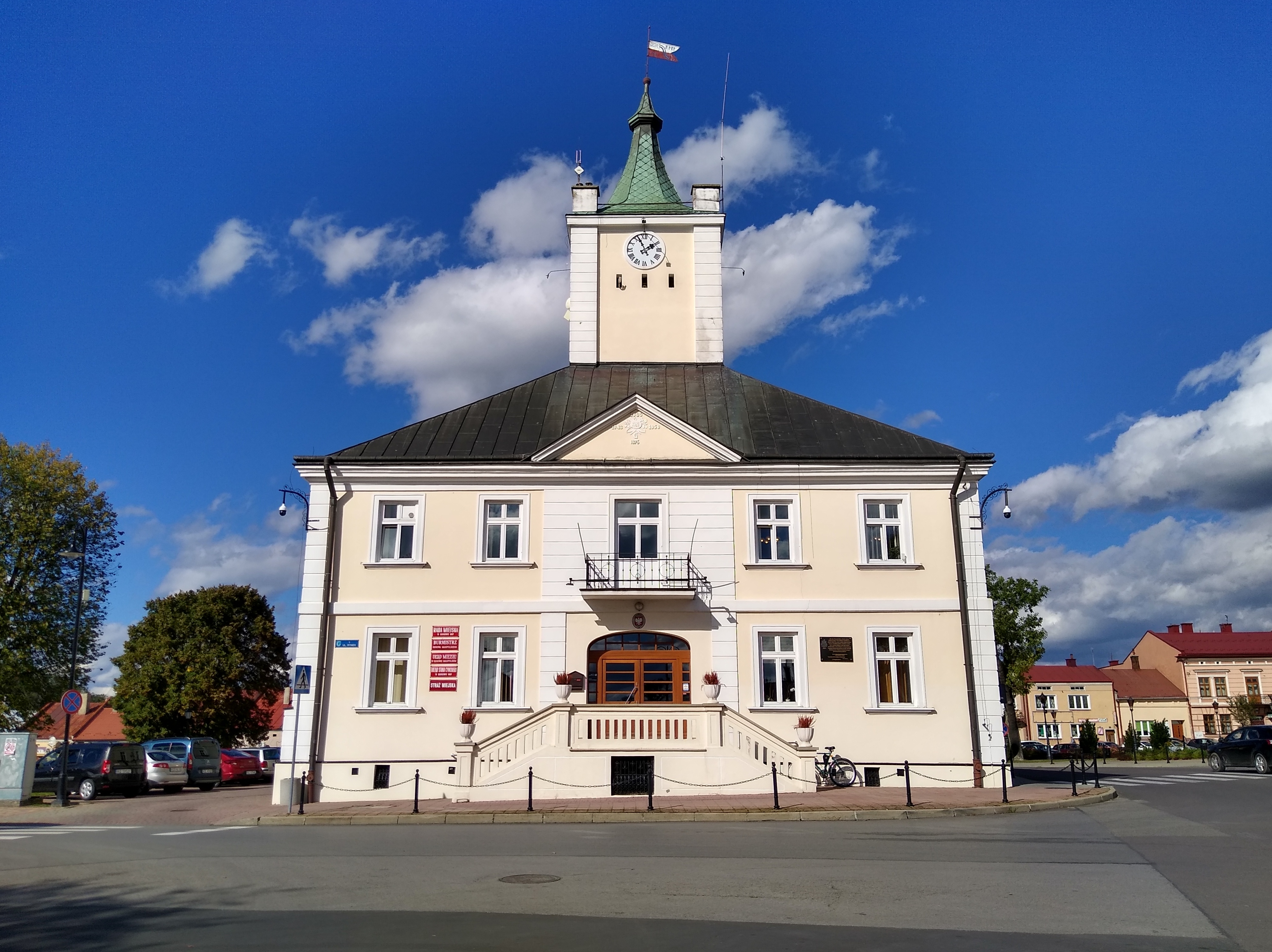
- Town hall

- Flag Coat of arms

- Location within Poland
- Coordinates: 50°10′N 21°58′E
- Country: Poland
- Voivodeship: Subcarpathian
- County: Rzeszów
- Gmina: Głogów Małopolski
- Town rights: 1570
- Founder: Krzysztof Głowa

Government
  - Mayor: Tomasz Skoczylas

Area
  - Total: 13.73 km^{2} (5.30 sq mi)

Population (2006)
  - Total: 5,123
  - Density: 373.1/km^{2} (966.4/sq mi)
- Time zone: UTC+1 (CET)
  - Summer (DST): UTC+2 (CEST)
- Postal code: 36-060
- Vehicle registration: RZE
- Website: http://www.glogow-mlp.pl/

Głogów Małopolski [ˈɡwɔɡuf mawɔˈpɔlskʲi] is a town in Rzeszów County, Subcarpathian Voivodeship, Poland. As of 31 December 2008, it has a population of 5,325.

== Geographic location ==
Głogów Małopolski lies in southern part of the Sandomierz Basin, and historically belongs to the province of Lesser Poland. Since its foundation until the Partitions of Poland, the town was part of Sandomierz Voivodeship. In 1772 - 1918, it belonged to the Austrian province of Galicia. The distance to Rzeszów is 12 kilometres (7 miles). The town is served by Rzeszow's municipal transport system, it also has a rail station, with connections to Rzeszow, Stalowa Wola and Lublin. Furthermore, Głogów lies along National Road Nr. 9, which is part of the European route E371. Road traffic now bypasses the center of the town, due to a 5 km (3 miles) ring road, opened in 2005.

== History ==
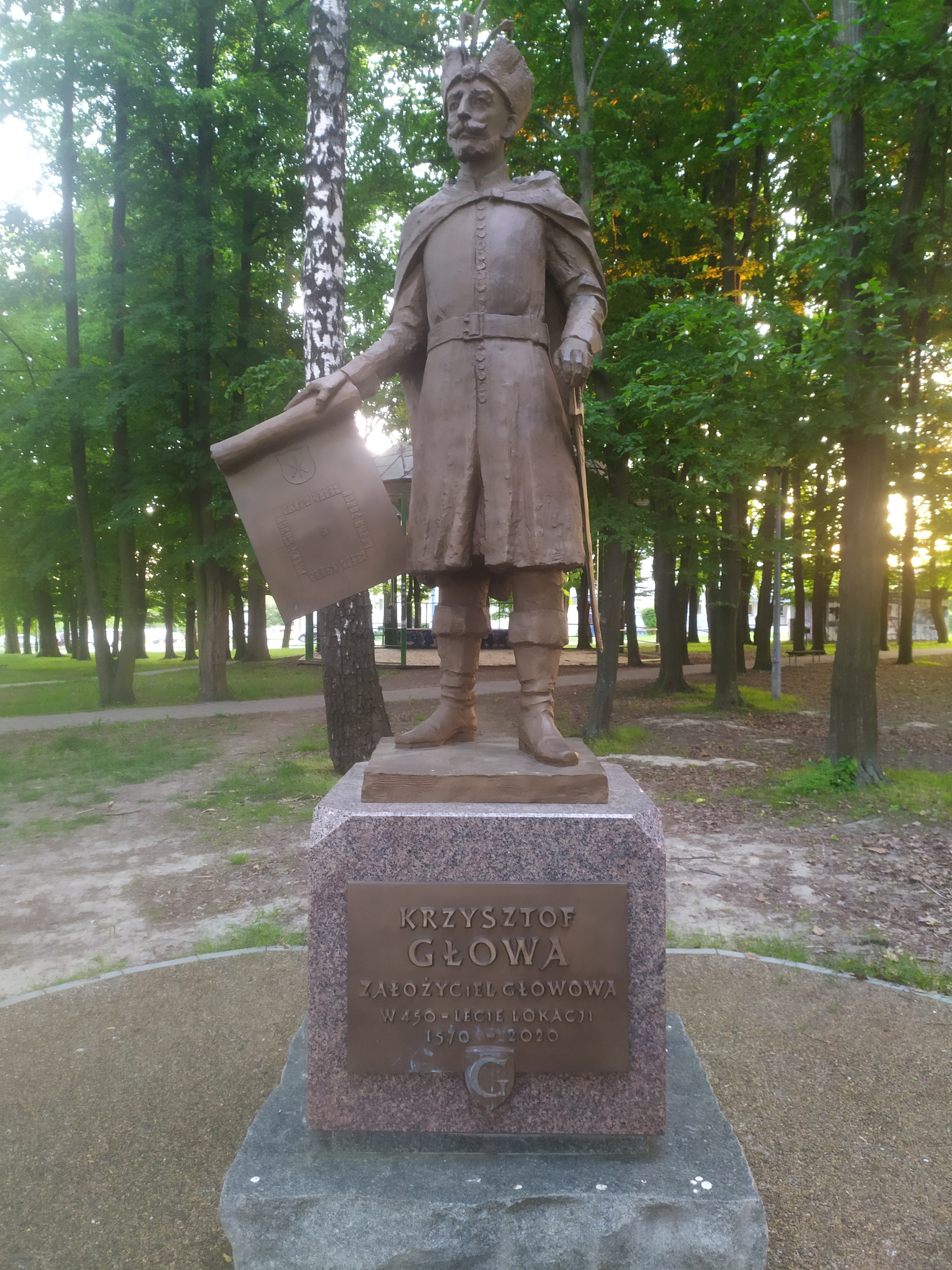
Monument of Krzysztof Głowa, founder of the town

The history of Głogów begins on April 22, 1570, when a local nobleman Krzysztof Głowa of Nowosielce (Jelita coat of arms) issued a document, upon which a brand new town called Głowów was to be founded in a forest along a merchant route to Sandomierz. According to Glowa's plans, the town was to become an ideal Renaissance urban center, competing with the nearby Rzeszow. Architects, employed by Glowa, designed a large market square (168/168 meters), with plots for 40 houses. Furthermore, special plots were fashioned for gardens, church, rectory, bath house, hospital, mill, brewery and folwark. According to the original plans, Głogów was to have 200 houses, whose residents were to be exempted from taxes for 20 years. Two fairs a year were planned, markets took place every Tuesday, and the inhabitants were permitted to brew their own beer. The shape of the municipal government and court was based on Magdeburg rights town law.

After the death of Krzysztof Glowa, the town belonged to Castellan of Sandomierz Mikolaj Spytko Ligeza of Bobrek (Polkozic coat of arms). The new owner confirmed all privileges, granting new ones. Ligeza founded a wooden parish church with a bell tower (1630), a hospital for the poor, and a wooden town hall (1636). After a Crimean Tatars raid (1624), the town was surrounded by a protective rampart with several towers, whose traces are still visible in some spots. Mikolaj Ligeza died in 1637, and after his death, Głowów, together with Rzeszów and Sędziszów Małopolski was captured by the Zaslawski family. Soon afterwards, it passed into the hands of the Lubomirski family, which owned it for 150 years, and changed the name to Głogów.

The town was burned down by the soldiers of George II Rakoczi, during the Swedish invasion of Poland. Once again, it was looted and destroyed during the Great Northern War. In 1725 Urszula Lubomirska built a small palace, together with an extensive garden. In 1766, a new church together with a monastery was completed, together with a town hall (the monastery burned in 1803). Głogów prospered in the second half of the 18th century. Until 1772 (see Partitions of Poland) it belonged to Sandomierz Voivodeship in the Lesser Poland Province, and in 1772 - 1918, it was part of Austrian province of Galicia. The town was famous in the region for its fairs

In the 19th century, Głogów remained a local center of commerce and administration, with a court, a post office, notary public, pharmacy and a school. The residents of the town actively supported patriotic movements, with some of them joining the November Uprising and the January Uprising, which took place in the Russian-controlled Congress Poland. Most of the buildings were made of wood, which resulted in frequent fires. To prevent them, the Firefigter Volunteers was created in 1878. In 1903, local office of the Gymnastic Association Sokol was opened here, and its members later joined the Polish Legions of Józef Piłsudski. In the Second Polish Republic, Głogów belonged to Lwow Voivodeship, and in the late 1930s, with the Central Industrial Area, the town's importance was reduced at the expense of the quickly growing Rzeszow. As a result, Głogów turned into Rzeszow's commuter town.

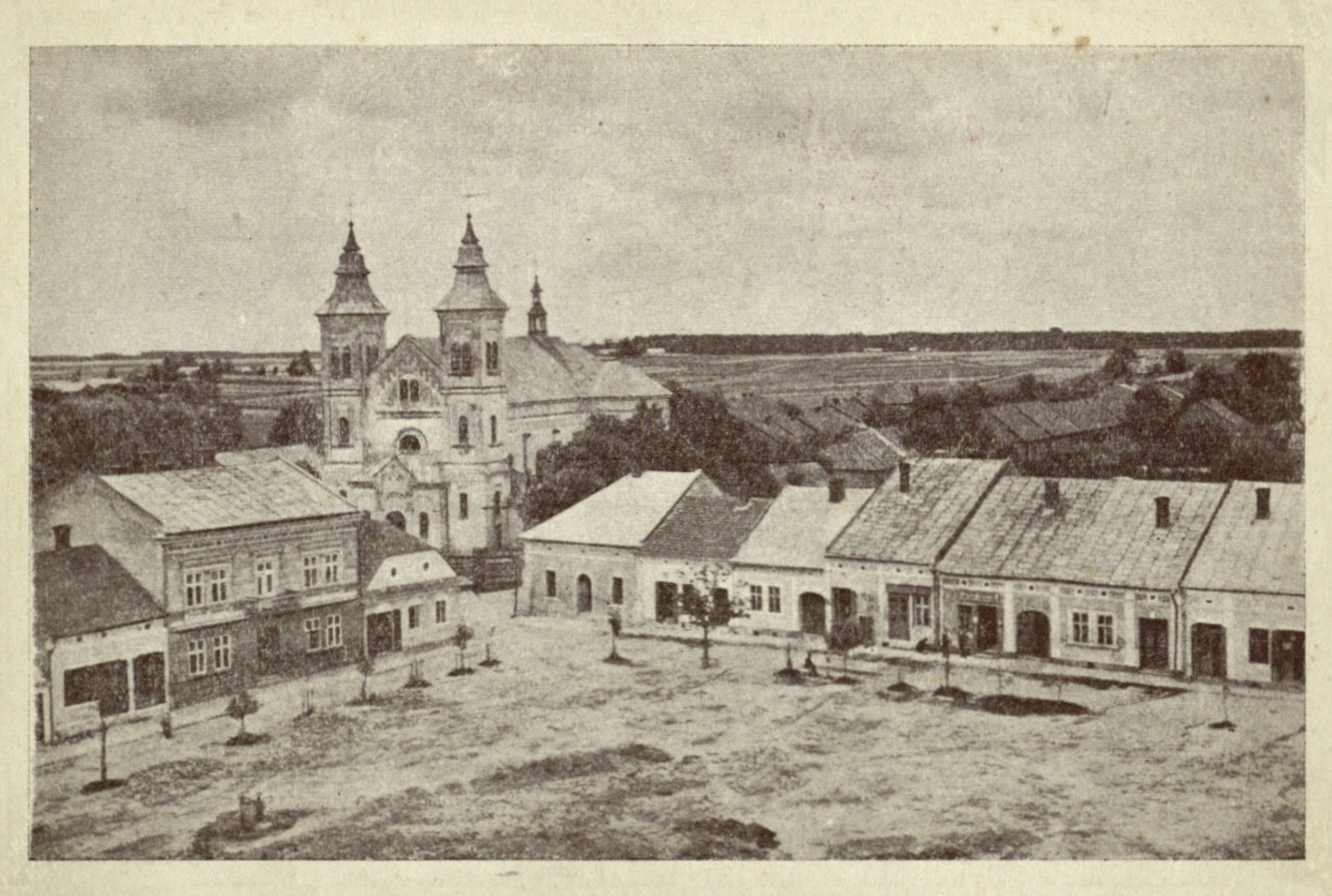
Early-20th-century view of the town

During World War II, local Jewish population was exterminated by the Germans in the Holocaust. Some 5,000 people, both Poles and Polish Jews, were murdered in a forest, located between Głogów and Rzeszow. In the night of February 22/23, the town was captured by a local Armia Ludowa unit, and in a skirmish, the town hall was burned. As a reprisal, the Gestapo later shot six hostages. The town was captured by the Red Army on July 30, 1944.

Soon after the war, when the ancient Silesian city of Głogów became again part of Poland, the adjective “Małopolski” (Lesser Polish) was added to the town's name, to distinguish it from the larger Silesian city. In 1950, electrification of the town was completed, and in 1960, Głogów Małopolski received rail connection with Rzeszow.

== Villages ==
- Zabajka
