= Gmina Głogów Małopolski =

Gmina Głogów Małopolski Głogów Małopolski Commune
- Gmina
- Flag Coat of arms
- Interactive map of Gmina Głogów Małopolski
- Coordinates (Głogów Małopolski): 50°10′N 21°58′E
- Country: Poland
- Voivodeship: Subcarpathian
- County: Rzeszów County
- Seat: Głogów Małopolski

Area
  - Total: 142.30 km^{2} (54.94 sq mi)

Population (2006)
  - Total: 18,185
  - Density: 127.79/km^{2} (330.98/sq mi)
  - Urban: 5,123
  - Rural: 13,062
- Website: http://www.glogow-mlp.pl/

Gmina Głogów Małopolski is an urban-rural gmina (administrative district) in Rzeszów County, Subcarpathian Voivodeship, in south-eastern Poland. Its seat is the town of Głogów Małopolski, which lies approximately 16 kilometres (10 mi) north of the regional capital Rzeszów.

The gmina covers an area of 145.76 square kilometres (56.3 sq mi), and as of 2006 its total population is 18,185 (out of which the population of Głogów Małopolski amounts to 5,123, and the population of the rural part of the gmina is 13,062).

== Villages ==
Apart from the town of Głogów Małopolski, Gmina Głogów Małopolski contains the villages and settlements of Budy Głogowskie, Hucisko, Lipie, Pogwizdów Stary, Przewrotne, Rudna Mała and Wysoka Głogowska.

== Neighbouring gminas ==
Gmina Głogów Małopolski is bordered by the city of Rzeszów and by the gminas of Kolbuszowa, Raniżów, Sokołów Małopolski, Świlcza and Trzebownisko.
