= List of chief rabbis of Israel and Mandatory Palestine =

The chief rabbi of Israel is a religious appointment that began at the time of the British Mandate in Palestine, and continued through to the State of Israel. The post has two nominees, one for the Ashkenazi communities that came from Europe, and one for the Sefaradic communities from North Africa and the Middle East. In recent times the post has become more political than religious.

== List of chief rabbis ==
Ashkenazi chief rabbis
No	Portrait	Name	Term	Notes
1		Abraham Isaac haCohen Kook (1865–1935)	1921–1935	Chief Rabbi of Mandatory Palestine
2		Yitzchak haLevi Herzog (1888–1959)	1936–1959	Chief Rabbi of Ireland (1919–1936); First Chief Rabbi of the State of Israel; Father of Israeli president Chaim Herzog; Grandfather of current Israeli president Isaac Herzog
3		Isser Yehuda Unterman (1886–1976)	1964–1973	Chief rabbi of Liverpool and Tel Aviv
4		Shlomo Goren (1917–1994)	1973–1983	Chief Rabbi of the IDF (1948–1968)
5		Avraham Shapira (1914–2007)	1983–1993	
6		Yisrael Meir Lau (born 1937)	1993–2003	Father of David Lau
7		Yona Metzger (born 1953)	2003–2013	Later convicted for fraud and served prison sentence
8		David Lau (born 1966)	2013–2024	Son of Yisrael Meir Lau
9		Kalman Ber (born 1957)	2024–present	

Sefardic chief rabbis
No	Portrait	Name	Term	Notes
1		Yaacov Meir (1856–1939)	1921–1939	First Chief Rabbi of Palestine
2		Ben-Zion Uziel (1880–1953)	1939–1953	First Chief Rabbi of Israel
3		Yitzchak Nissim (1896–1981)	1955–1973	Father of former MK, minister and deputy Prime Minister, Moshe Nissim
4		Ovadia Yosef (1920–2013)	1973–1983	Spiritual leader and founder of Shas political party Father of Yitzchak Yosef
5		Mordechai Eliyahu (1929–2010)	1983–1993	
6		Eliyahu Bakshi-Doron (1941–2020)	1993–2003	Convicted of fraud, sentenced to probation and ordered to pay a NIS 250,000 fine
7		Shlomo Amar (born 1948)	2003–2013	Related to Yitzchak Yosef by marriage
8		Yitzchak Yosef (born 1952)	2013–2024	Son of Ovadia Yosef; Related to Shlomo Amar by marriage
9		David Yosef (born 1957)	2024–present	Brother of Yitzchak Yosef

== Chief Rabbinate Council ==
The chief rabbis also head the Chief Rabbinate Council. These rabbis are usually appointed from the chief rabbis of major cities or regions in Israel.

Among the roles of the council is giving out kosher certification, nominating rabbis able to perform wedding ceremonies, appointing rabbis of cities and appointing religious judges who are able to sit on a Beth Din.

The current members of the council are:

- Rabbi David Lau—the Ashkenazi Chief Rabbi
- Rabbi Yitzhak Yosef—the Sephardi Chief Rabbi
- Rabbi Shimon Elituv—Chief Rabbi of Mateh Binyamin Regional Council
- Rabbi Shmuel Eliyahu—Chief Rabbi of Safed, son of former Chief Rabbi, Mordechai
- Rabbi Eliezer Simcha Weiss—Rabbi of Kfar Haroeh
- Rabbi Yitzchak Dovid Grossman—Chief Rabbi of Migdal HaEmek
- Rabbi Yehuda Deri—Chief Rabbi of Beersheba, brother of member of Knesset, Aryeh, related to Chief Rabbi Shlomo Amar by marriage
- Rabbi Yitzchak Levi—Chief Rabbi of Nesher
- Rabbi Ratzon Arusi—Chief Rabbi of Kiryat Ono
- Rabbi Yitzhak Peretz—Chief Rabbi of Raanana
- Rabbi Yitzhak Ralbag—former chairman of Jerusalem Rabbinate council and relative by marriage of Chief Rabbi David Lau
- General Rabbi Eyal Karim—Chief Rabbi of the Israel Defense Forces
- Rabbi Yaakov Roja —neighbourhood rabbi in Bat Yam / ZAKA
- Rabbi Aryeh Stern—Chief Rabbi of Jerusalem
- Rabbi Yaakov Shapira—Rosh Yeshiva Mercaz HaRav, son of former Chief Rabbi, Avraham

== Chief rabbis of the armed forces ==
In addition to the Chief Rabbinate, there is also a position as the Chief Rabbi of the Israel Defense Forces. This individual has a rank of Tat Aluf (Brigadier General).

Term	Portrait	Name	Notes
1948–1971		General Rabbi Shlomo Goren (1917–1994)	Chief Rabbi of Israel (1973–1983)
1971–1977		General Rabbi Mordechai Piron (1921–2014)	
1977–2000		General Rabbi Gad Navon (1922–2006)	
2000–2006		General Rabbi Yisrael Wiess (born 1949)	
2006–2010		General Rabbi Avihai Rontzki (1951–2018)	
2010–2016		General Rabbi Rafi Peretz (born 1956)	Head of the Jewish Home political party (2019–21)
2016–present		General Rabbi Eyal Karim (born 1957)	Member of Chief Rabbinate Council

== Religious authorities prior to the British Mandate ==
=== The Chief Rabbi of Jerusalem ===
In addition to the chief rabbis, there were a number of rabbis who served as the head rabbi in Palestine, or of a particular community

- Levi ibn Habib (b. Spain)—ruled from Jerusalem but in 1538, Rabbi Jacob Berab who came from Spain via Egypt, sought to revive the Sanhedrin, in Safed, thus making that city the competing capital of the Jewish community in Palestine. He was opposed and exiled by ibn Habib and the rabbis of Jerusalem but Safed remained the competing capital for a number of years thereafter. Berab was succeeded in Safed by Joseph Caro (b. Spain) who was ordained by him.
- David ben Solomon ibn Abi Zimra of the Egyptian rabbinate—ruled simultaneously in Jerusalem succeeding ibn Habib. In 1575, Moshe Trani (b. Greece) succeeded Caro in Safed.
- Moshe ben Mordechai Galante of Rome—ruled from Jerusalem
- Haim Vital—succeeded Trani in Safed but moved his rabbinate to Jerusalem which, once again, became the sole capital of Israel. In 1586, the Nahmanides Synagogue was confiscated by the Arabs and the ben Zakkai Synagogue was built in its stead.
- Bezalel Ashkenazi—first chief rabbi to preside in the ben Zakkai Synagogue
- Gedaliah Cordovero
- Yitzhak Gaon?
- Israel Benjamin
- Jacob Zemah (b. Portugal)
- Samuel Garmison (b. Greece)

=== Rishon LeZion 1665–1842 ===
- Moshe ben Yonatan Galante
- Moshe ibn Habib who came from Greece, a descendant of Levi ibn Habib
- Moshe Hayun
- Avraham Yitzhaki (b. Greece)
- Benjamin Maali
- Elazar Nahum (b. Turkey)
- Nissim Mizrahi
- Yitzhak Rapaport
- Israel Algazy served until 1756
- Raphael Meyuchas ben Shmuel served 1756–1791
- Haim Raphael ben Asher - served until 1772 and was succeeded by Rabbi Raphael Moshe Bula.
- Raphael Moshe Bula - Rabbi Raphael Moshe ben Rabbi Yosef Bula, author of Chayei Olam (Kushta, 1752). Gett Mekishar (Kushta, 1767) and Zchus Moshe (Salonika, 1818). Was born in Salonika (Ottoman Greece), moved to Ancona (Italy) and then immigrated to Jerusalem. In 1752, was sent to Turkey as a Shadar of the communities of Jerusalem. After his return to Jerusalem, studied and was the dean at the Neveh Sholom Yeshiva and in ca. 1757 was appointed as its Rosh Yeshiva. Since 1772, served as the Rishon LeZion, until his death in on the 27th day as a result of famine and disease, Rabbi Bula was among the sick and died in Jerusalem. He was buried in the Mount of Olives and in 1777, his wife Zinbul died and was buried next to him. His son was Rabbi Solomon (Shlomo) Bula, author of the book “Lehen Shlomo”. His daughter was married to Rabbi Yom Tov Algazi. He was succeeded by his son-in-law Rabbi Yom Tov Algazi in 1773.
- Yom Tov Algazy— son of Rabbi Israel Algazi and son in law of Rabbi Raphael Moshe Bula who succeeded him shortly after his death in 1973, during whose reign, the French armies of Napoleon invaded Palestine. served from 1973 until 1802.
- Moshe Yosef Mordechai Meyuchas served 1802–1805
- Yaakov Aish of the Maghreb
- Yaakov Coral
- Yosef Hazzan (b. Turkey)
- Yom Tov Danon
- Shlomo Suzin—in 1831, Palestine was briefly conquered by Egypt under Muhammad Ali.
- Yonah Navon—Palestine returned to the Ottoman Empire.
- Yehuda Navon

=== The Hakham Bashi 1842–1918 ===
- Avraham Haim Gaggin (b. Turkey)
- Yitzhak Kovo
- Chaim Nissim Abulafia (b. 1795, Tiberias; d. 1860, Jerusalem)
- Haim Hazzan (b. Turkey)
- Avraham Ashkenazi (b. Greece)
- Raphael Panigel (b. Bulgaria)
- Yaakov Shaul Elyashar
- Yaakov Meir
- Yoseph Zundel Salant
- Shmuel Salant
- Eliyahu Moshe Panigel
- Nahman Batito
- Nissim Yehuda Danon—In 1917, Palestine was occupied by the British. Danon was succeeded as chief rabbi after World War I by Haim Moshe Eliashar who assumed the title of Acting Chief Rabbi.
