= List of Jewish leaders in the Land of Israel =

The following is a list of people who were in the position of the leaders of the Jewish nation, heads of state and/or government in the Land of Israel.

Because of the position of the Land of Israel in Judaism, the leaders of the inhabitants of the land had a priority status also over Diaspora Jewry, although there were periods when this status weakened due to the weakening of the Jewish settlement in the Land of Israel. For this reason, among others, great efforts were made by Jewish leaders in the Diaspora to immigrate to the Land of Israel throughout the generations.

== The period of the judges ==
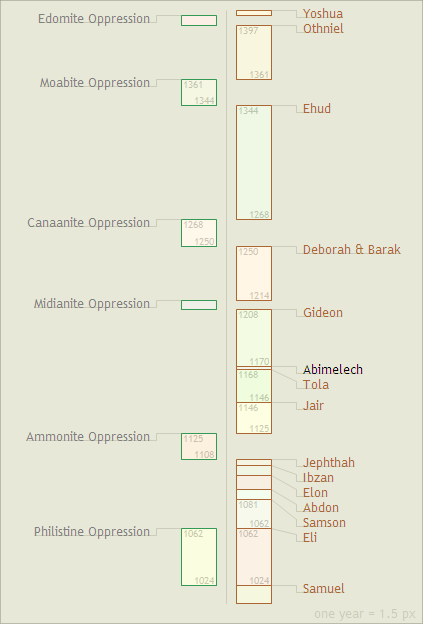
Timeline of biblical judges (one interpretation)

"The judges" was a period were individuals from different of the Twelve Tribes of Israel, served as leaders in times of crisis, in the period before the monarchy was established in Israel.

- Joshua son of Nun, the successor of Moses. Tribe of Ephraim
- Othniel son of Qenaz. Tribe of Judah
- Ehud son of Gera. Tribe of Benjamin
- Shamgar son of Anath. Tribe of Levi
- Deborah wife of Lapidoth
- Gideon son of Joash. Tribe of Manasseh
- Abimelech son of Gideon. Tribe of Manasseh
- Tola son of Poua. Tribe of Issachar
- Jair HaGileadi. Tribe of Manasseh
- Jephthah HaGileadi. Tribe of Manasseh
- Ibzan. Tribe of Judah
- Elon. Tribe of Zebulun
- Abdon son of Hillel, a Pirathonite. Tribe of Ephraim
- Samson son of Manoah. Tribe of Dan
- Eli Hacohen, the high priest in Shiloh. Tribe of Levi
- Samuel son of Elkanah. Tribe of Levi
- Yoel and Aviya sons of Samuel. Tribe of Levi

== House of Saul ==
- King Saul (c. 1037–1010 BCE) (Tribe of Benjamin)
- King Ish-bosheth (II Samuel 2:8–9)

== House of David ==
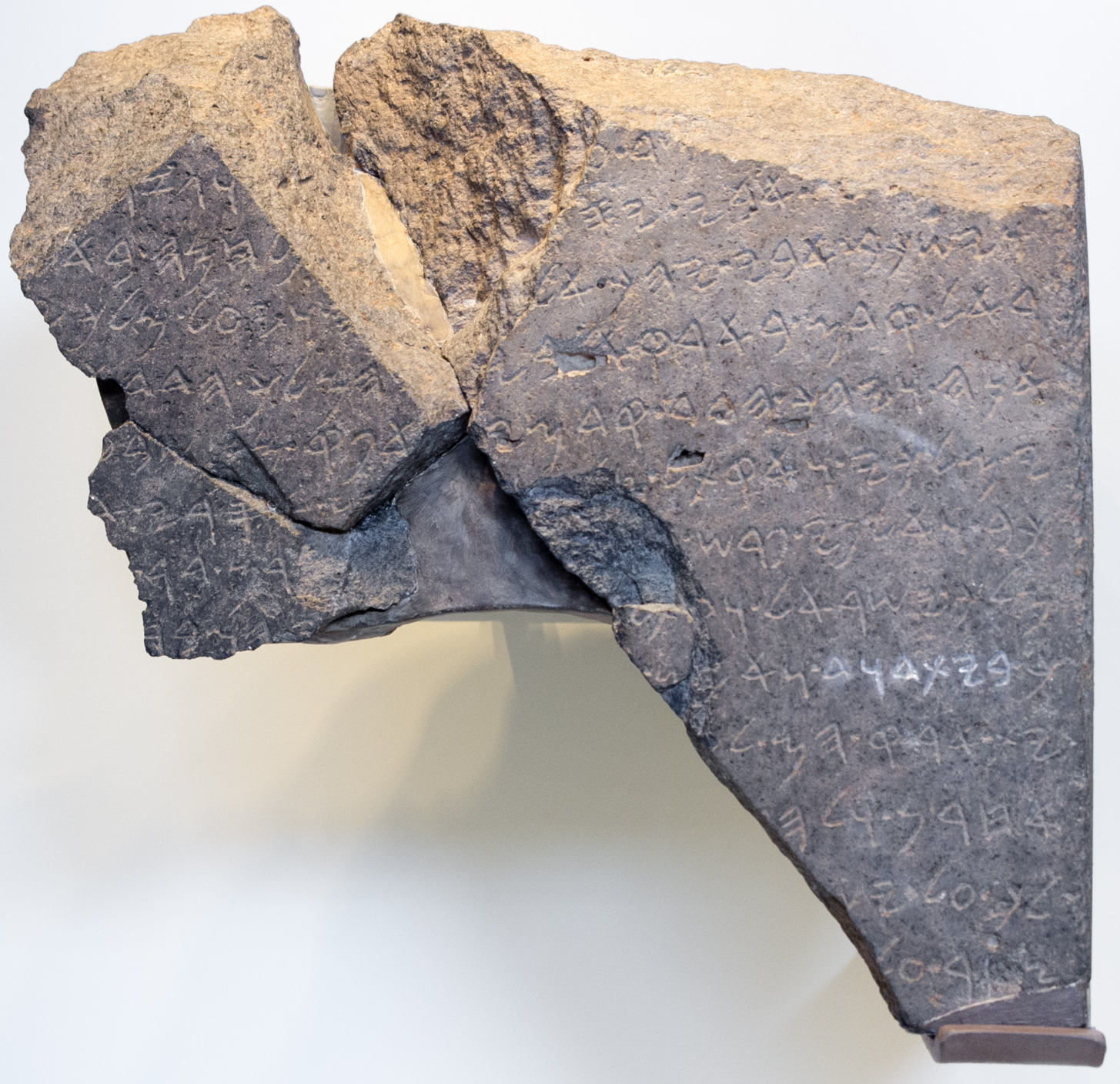
The Tel Dan Stele a fragmentary stele containing a Canaanite inscription which dates to the 9th century BCE with reference to the house of David

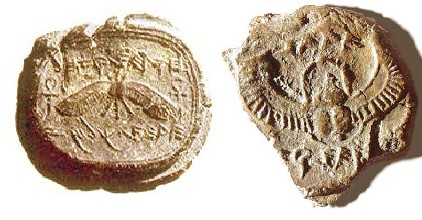
royal seal found at the Ophel excavations in Jerusalem, bears an inscription in ancient Hebrew script that translates as: “Belonging to Hezekiah [son of] Ahaz king of Judah.”

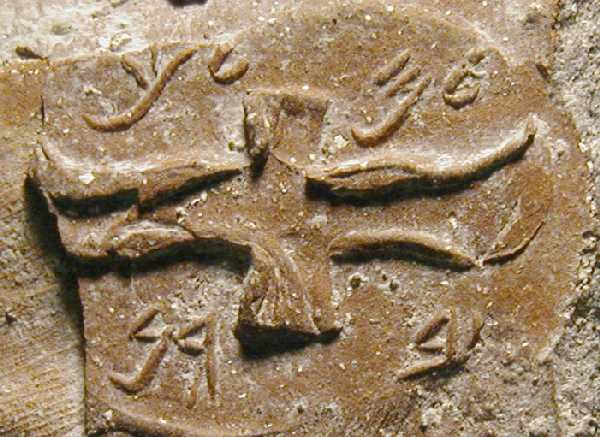
LMLK seals (with LMLK meaning 'of the king') are ancient Hebrew seals stamped on the handles of large storage jars first issued in the reign of King Hezekiah (circa 700 BC)

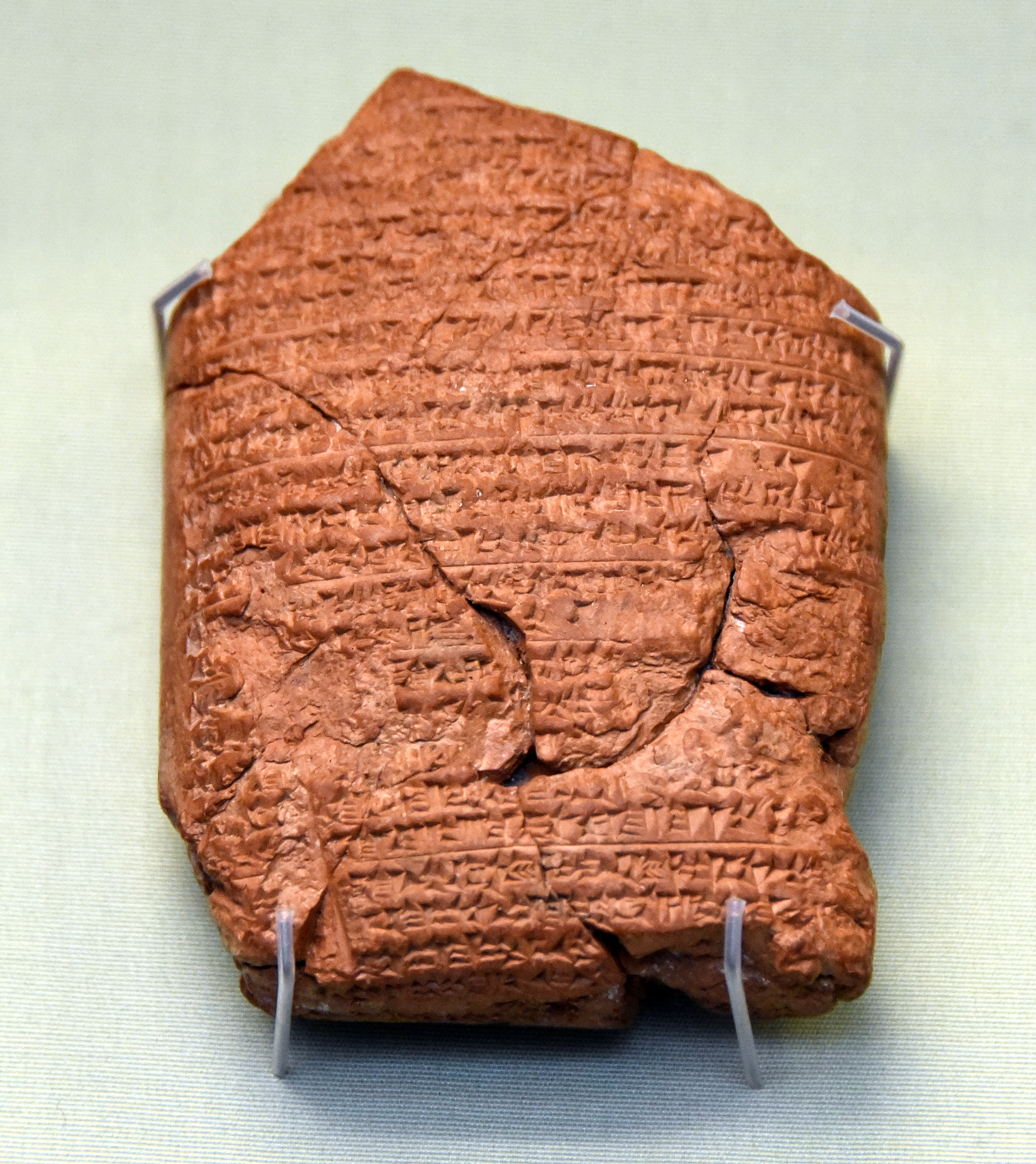
The cuneiform inscription on this clay tablet highlights the conquest of Jerusalem by Nebuchadnezzar II and the surrender of Jehoiakim, king of Judah, in 597 BC. From Babylon, Iraq.

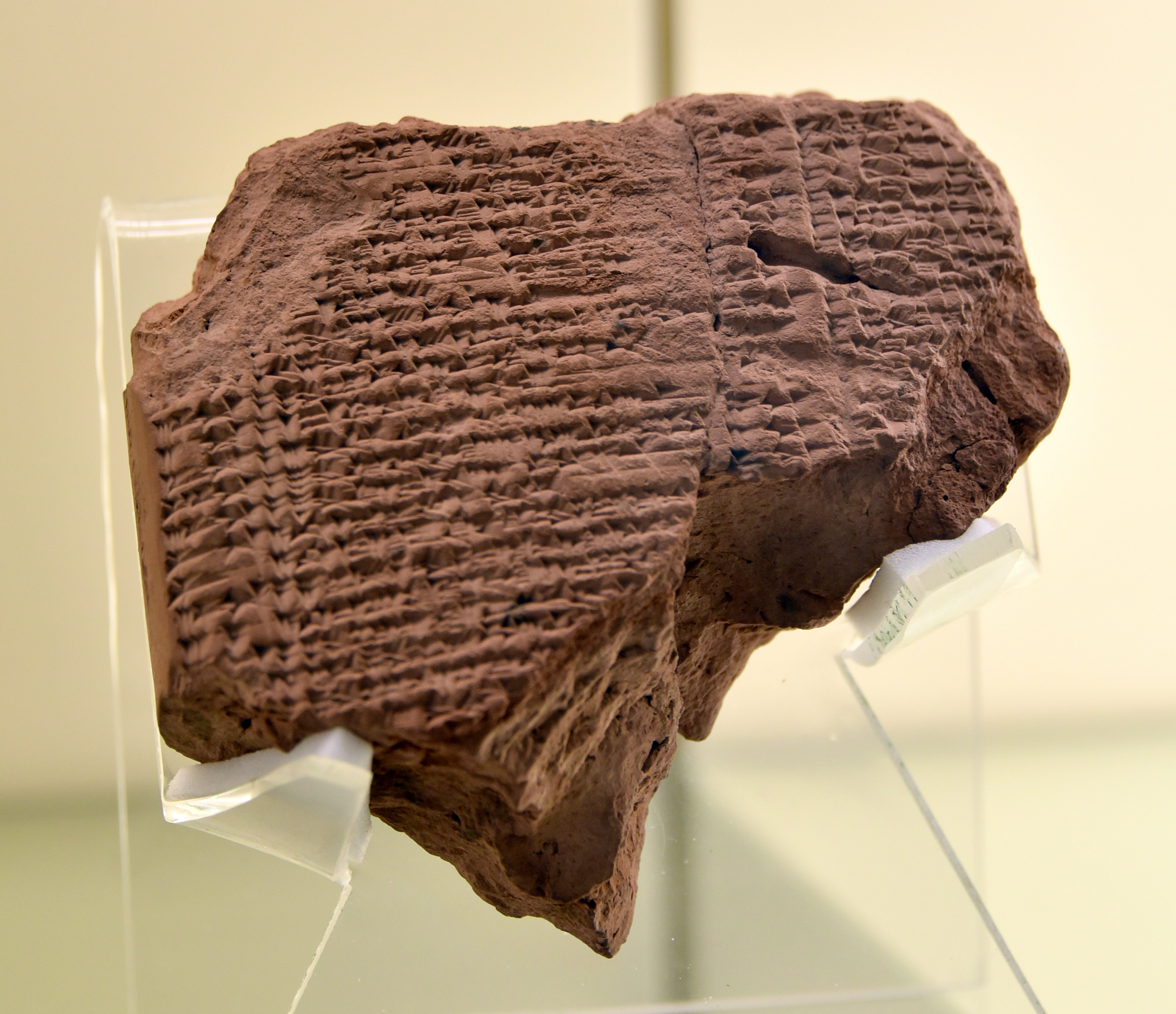
Clay tablet. The Akkadian cuneiform inscription lists certain rations and mentions the name of Jeconiah (Jehoiachin), King of Judah, and the Babylonian captivity. From Babylon, Iraq, c. 580 BCE.

- King David, Tribe of Judah (II Samuel 5:3) c. 1010–970 BCE – who made Jerusalem the capital of the United Kingdom of Israel.
- King Solomon (I Kings 2:12)
- King Rehoboam (I Kings 11:43)

=== After the split of the kingdom ===
After Rehoboam reigned three years (1 Chronicles 11:17), the kingdom was divided in two – the northern kingdom of Israel under Jeroboam, with its capital, first in Shechem (Nablus), then Tirzah, and finally Samaria, and ruled by a series of dynasties beginning with Jeroboam; and the southern kingdom of Judah with its capital still at Jerusalem and still ruled by the House of David. The following list contains the kings of Judah with the kings of Israel in the summaries. See also: the dynasties of the northern kingdom of Israel.

- King Abijam (I Kings 14:31) c. 913-911 BCE
- King Asa (I Kings 15:8) – under whose reign, the following were kings in Israel: Nadab, Baasha, Elah, Zimri, Omri, and Ahab.
- King Jehoshaphat (I Kings 15:24) – under whose reign, Ahaziah and Jehoram reigned in Israel.
- King Jehoram ben Jehoshaphat (I Kings 22:50)
- King Ahaziah ben Jehoram (II Kings 8:24) – under whose reign, Jehu ruled in Israel.
- Queen Athaliah (II Kings 11:3) mother of Ahaziah
- King Jehoash (II Kings 11:21) – son of Ahaziah, under whose reign, Jehoahaz and another Jehoash ruled in Israel.
- King Amaziah (II Kings 14:1) – under whose reign, Jeroboam II ruled in Israel.
- King Uzziah referred to as Azariah (II Kings 15:1) – under whose reign, the following ruled over Israel: Zachariah, Shallum, Menahem, Pekahiah, and Pekah.
- King Jotham (II Kings 15:32)
- King Ahaz (II Kings 16:1) – under whose reign, Hoshea ruled as the last king of Israel.
- King Hezekiah (II Kings 18:1) – under his reign, the Assyrian Empire conquered and destroyed the northern kingdom 722 BCE leaving only the southern kingdom of Judah.
- King Manasseh (II Kings 20:21)
- King Amon (II Kings 21:18)
- King Josiah (II Kings 21:26)
- King Jehoahaz (II Kings 23:30) son of Josiah
- King Jehoiakim (II Kings 23:34) son of Josiah
- King Jeconiah (II Kings 24:6) son of Jehoiakim
- King Zedekiah (II Kings 24:17) – son of Josiah, last king to rule over, and in, Judah. Overthrown by the Chaldean Empire (which succeeded the Assyrian Empire) and exiled, along with most of the rest of the population, to that kingdom, where his 10 sons were executed in front of him, then he was blinded and imprisoned. [All thought he was released later on along with Jeconiah (who was imprisoned some 14 years before Zedekiah) when Nebuchadnezar died and was succeeded by his son Evil Moredach]
- Gedaliah (II Kings 25:22–23) son of Ahikam advisor to King Josiah; he became governor over the remnant of Judah in their homeland and was assassinated the next year [This ended all Jewish settlement in Israel for that period]

== Governors of the Persian Province of Judea ==
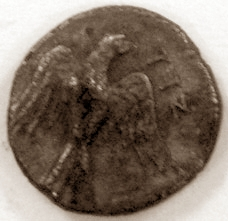
Obverse of a Judean silver Yehud coin from the Yehud coinage in the Persian era, with falcon or eagle and Aramaic inscription YHD (Judea). Denomination is a Ma'ah.

- Zerubbabel, (House of David), (Ezra 3:8) son of Shealtiel. In the first year of the reign of Cyrus, successor to Darius, the Jews were allowed to return to their homeland. Zerubbabel led the first group of returnees and ruled in Judea for two years. The date is generally thought to have been between 538 and 520 BC. The House of David had survived, but struggled to reclaim its place as the ruling House of Israel.
- Nehemiah (Book of Nehemiah) arrived in Jerusalem in 445 as governor of Judah, appointed by Artaxerxes.
- Hananiah (Nehemiah 7:2)
- Joshua the High Priest (Tribe of Levi)
- Ezra (High Priest) (457 BCE) (Sons of Zadok)
- Johanan (High Priest) (c. 410–371 BCE)
- Jaddua (High Priest) (c. 350 BCE)

== Honio dynasty (Sons of Zadok – High Priests) ==
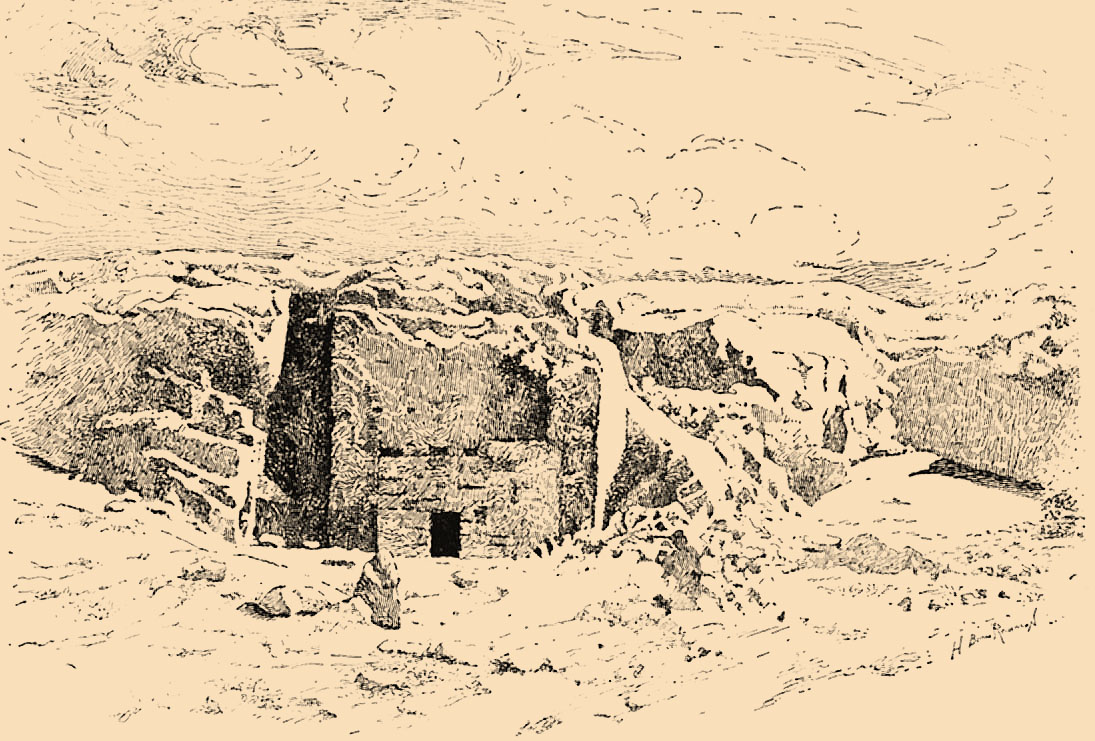
Traditional Tomb of Simeon the Just in Jerusalem, Jewish Encyclopedia (before 1906)

- (332 BCE) - The beginning of the Hellenistic period in Judea.
- Onias I (High Priest) (330–310 BCE) (son of the Jaddua), (Tribe of Levi)
- Simon I (High Priest) 310–291 or 300–270 BCE / Simeon the Just (Note: There is a dispute among the scholars regarding the identification of Shimon the Tzadik, some believe that he is Shimon the first, some say that he is Shimon the second, and some say that he is someone else.)
- Eleazar (High Priest) (c. 260–245 BCE)
- Manasseh (High Priest) (c. 245-240 BC)
- Onias II (High Priest)
- Simon II (High Priest) / Simeon the Just
- Onias III (High Priest)
- Jason (High Priest) (175 to 171 BCE)

== Hasmonean dynasty 168–37 BCE ==
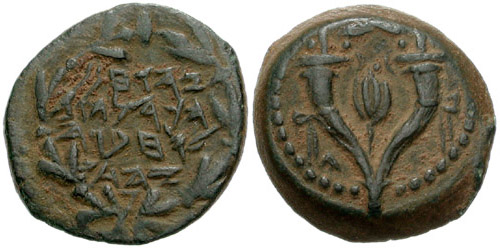
Judea, Hasmoneans. John Hyrcanus I (Yehohanan). 135–104 BCE. Æ Prutah. "Yehohanan the High Priest and the Council of the Jews" (in Hebrew).

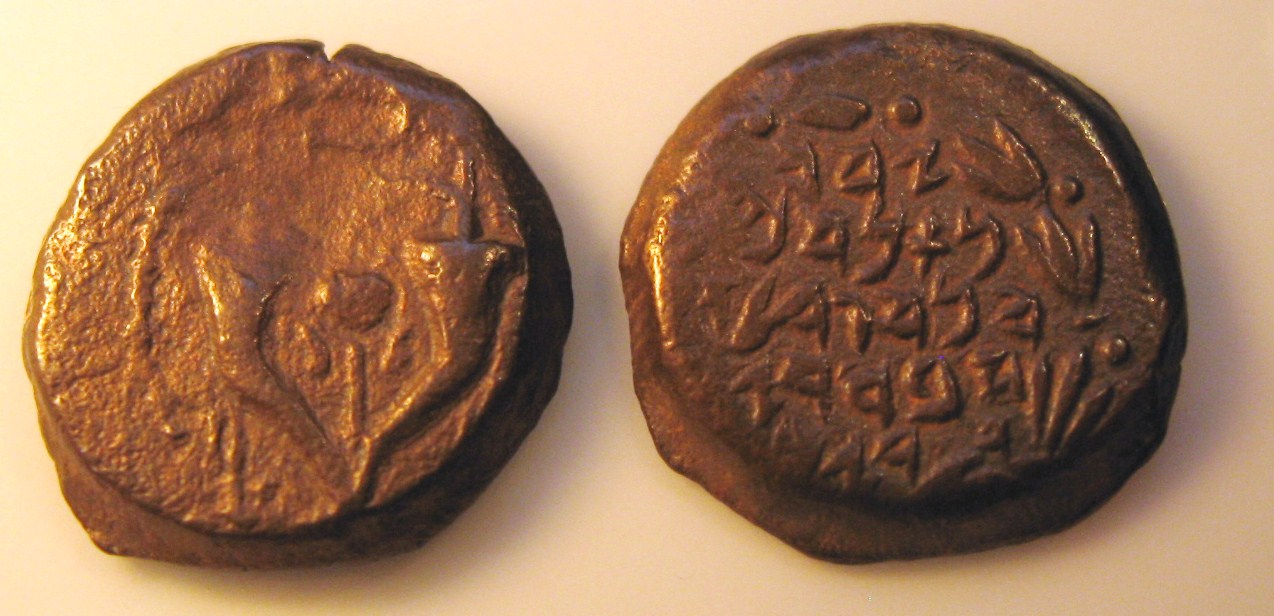
Judea, Hasmoneans. A coin issued by Alexander Jannaeus 103-76 BCE. On one side is the inscription (in Hebrew) "Yonathan the High Priest and the Friend of the Jews".

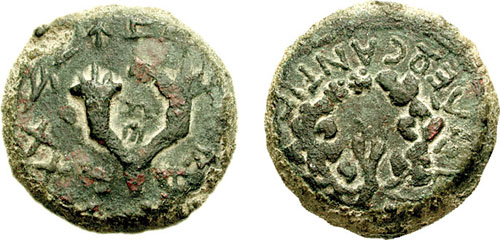
Judea, Hasmoneans. A coin issued by Antigonus II Mattathias. 40-37 BCE.

The Maccabees founded the Hasmonean dynasty, which ruled from 168 BCE – 37 BCE, reasserting the Jewish religion and expanding the boundaries of the Land of Israel by conquest. In the post-Maccabean period the high priest was looked upon as exercising in all things, political, legal, and sacerdotal, the supreme authority.

- Mattityahu – who began a war for independence., (Tribe of Levi)
- Judas Maccabeus – during whose reign, Alcimus succeeded Menelaeus as high priest.
- Jonathan – assumed the high priesthood.
- Simon – succeeded his brother Jonathan as high priest and was also installed as ethnarch. Under his reign, Judea gained its independence.
- John Hyrcanus I – also succeeded as ethnarch and high priest.
- Aristobulus – succeeded his father John Hyrcanus I as high priest and was also installed as king.
- Alexander Jannaeus – high priest and king.
- Salome Alexandra - reigning as queen only.
- Hyrcanus II – succeeded his father Alexander as high priest beginning with the rule of Salome. Became king upon the death of Salome.
- Aristobulus II – succeeded as high priest and king. During his reign, Judea lost its independence and passed under the rule of Rome (63 BCE) who overthrew him and reinstalled:
- Hyrcanus II as high priest only.
- Antigonus – high priest and king.

== Herodian dynasty (37 BCE – 70 CE) ==
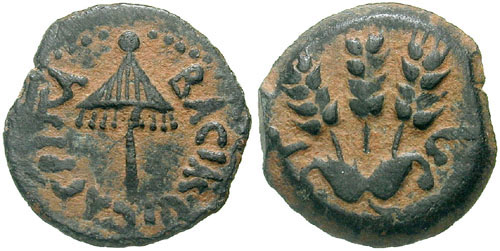
Coin minted by king Herod Agrippa I 37-44 ce. Æ Prutah. Dated year 6 (41/2) ce. BACILEWC AGRIPA.

A coin issued by the rebels in 68 in the First Jewish–Roman War, note Paleo-Hebrew alphabet. Obverse: "Shekel, Israel. Year 3." Reverse: "Jerusalem the Holy"

- King Herod the Great
- Ethnarch Herod Archelaus (4 BCE – 6 CE), ruler of Samaria, Judea, and Idumea, known as the Tetrarchy of Judea
- Herod Antipas
- Philip the Tetrarch
- Salome I

After Archelaus and during the intervening period, the Sanhedrin, founded by Ezra, became the sole rulers of the Jewish people in Judea in conjunction with the High Priest. The heads, or nesiim, of the Sanhedrin beginning in 20 BCE, were Hillel the Elder, his son Shimon, and his son Gamaliel I whose rule extended into the reign of:

- King Agrippa I (41–44)
- King Herod of Chalcis (41–48)
- Aristobulus of Chalcis
- Queen Berenice
- King Agrippa II (53–100). In 66 CE, the great revolt began against Rome, resulting in the Zealot Temple Siege and culminating in the destruction of the Temple in Jerusalem in 70 CE, the abolition of the High Priesthood, and the final defeat at Massada in 73 CE.

== Great Sanhedrin 80–429 CE ==
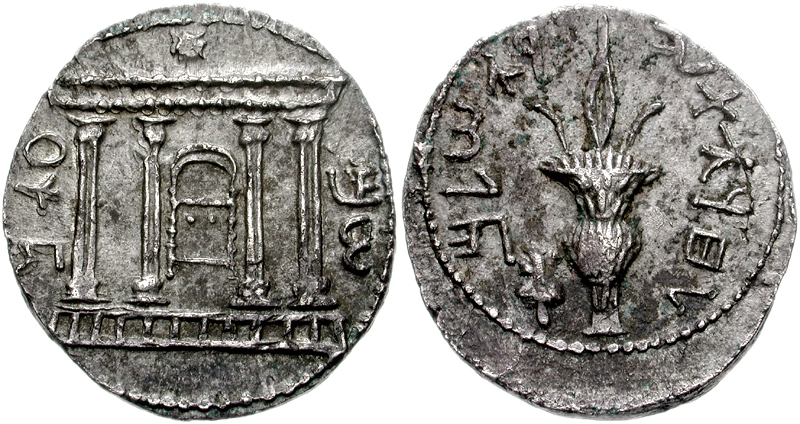
Bar Kochba Revolt (132-135 CE) silver Shekel/tetradrachm. Obverse: the Jewish Temple facade with the rising star, surrounded by "Shimon". Reverse: A lulav, the text reads: "to the freedom of Jerusalem".

The Patriarchate was the governing legalistic body of Judean and Galilean Jewry after the destruction of the Second Temple until about 429 CE. Being a member of the house of Hillel and thus a descendant of King David, the Patriarch, known in Hebrew as the Nasi (prince), had almost royal authority.

- Gamaliel II of Jamnia (80–115) - Council of Jamnia
- Eleazar ben Azariah (115–120) (Sons of Zadok)

Interregnum (Bar Kokhba revolt) (132–135)

- Judah bar Ilai c. 140 moved the Sanhedrin to Usha
- Shimon ben Gamliel II

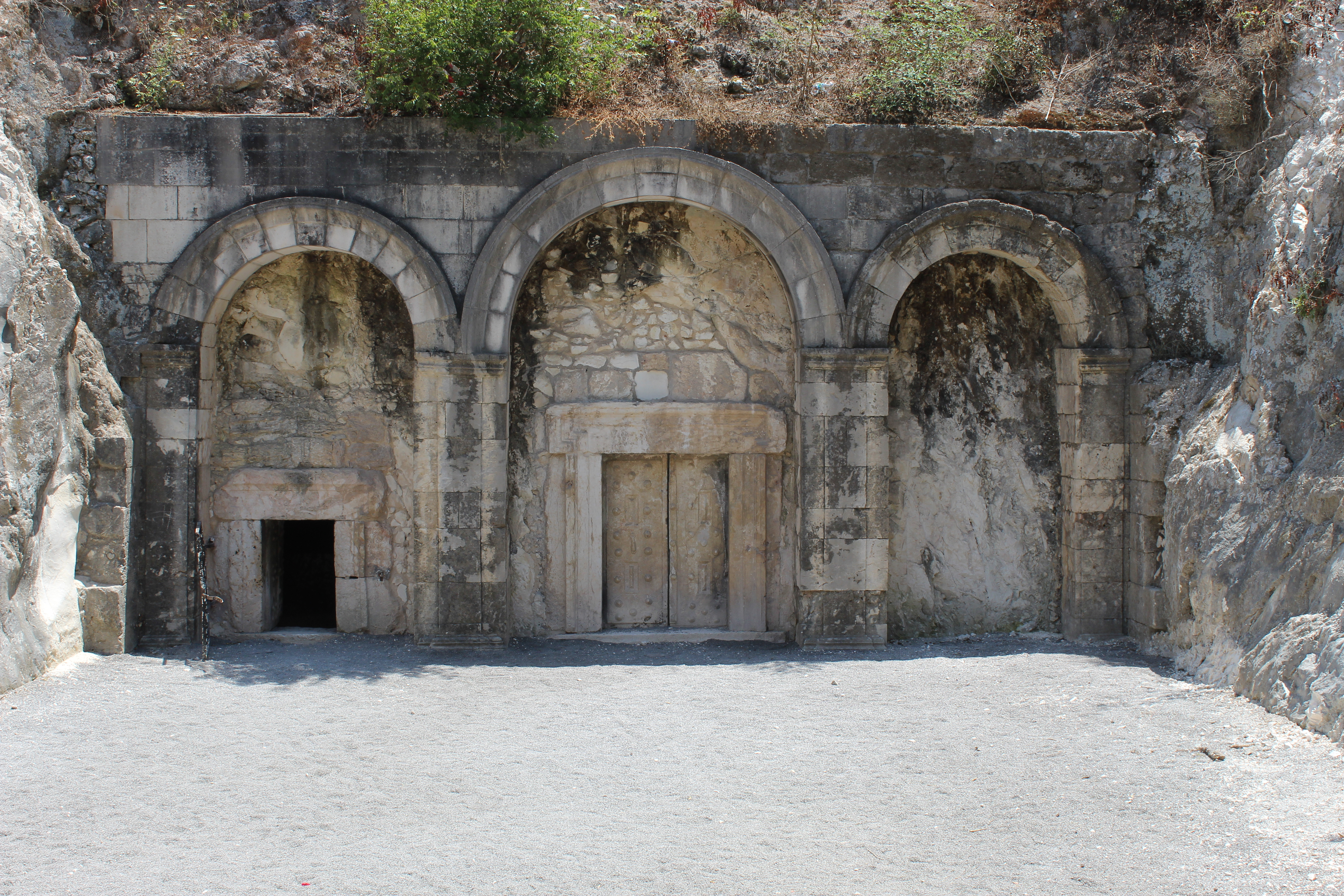
Catacomb no. 14, the Cave of Rabbi Judah ha-Nasi in Beit Shearim.

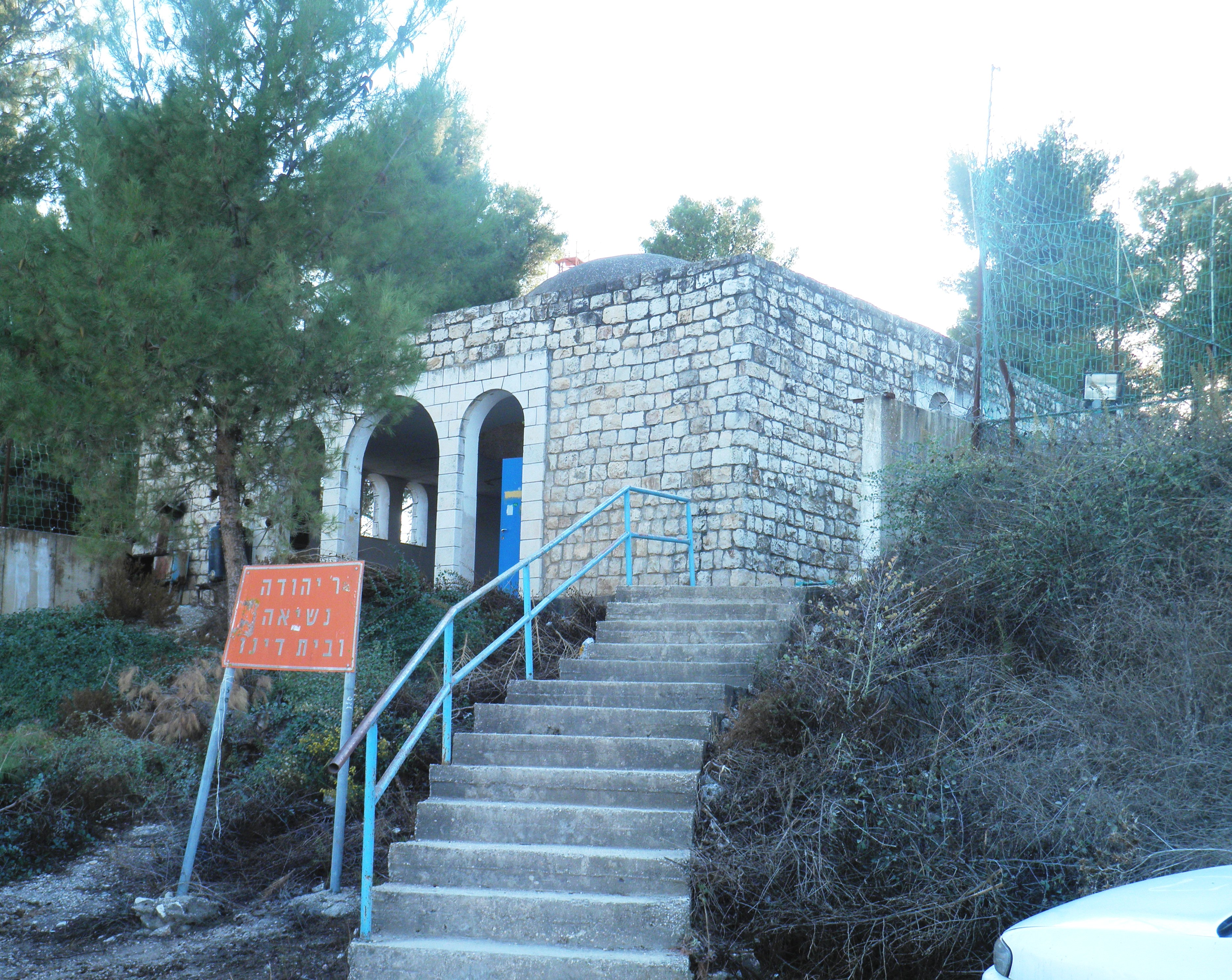
Tomb of Rabbi Judah II on Jamnith mountain.

- Judah haNasi (170–220) – lead from Bet Shearim, then Sepphoris
- Gamaliel III (220–230)
- Judah II (230–270) – lead from Sepphoris, then Tiberias. This was the Sanhedrin's last move.
- Gamaliel IV (270–290)
- Judah III (290–320)
- Hillel II (320–365) – 320 is given as the traditional date for the codification of the Jerusalem Talmud
- Gamaliel V (365–385)
- Judah IV (385–400) – in 395, the Roman Empire split into east and west and Palestine passed under the eastern Byzantine Empire.
- Gamaliel VI (400–425) – on 17 October 415, an edict issued by the Emperors Honorius and Theodosius II deposed Gamaliel VI as nasi. Theodosius did not allow the appointment of a successor and in 429 terminated the Jewish patriarchate.

== Mar-Zutra III dynasty (6th century) ==
- Mar-Zutra III, (House of David- Descendant of Jeconiah) lead from Tiberias.
- Rav Gorya
- Mar-Zutra IIII
- Rav Jacob
- Rav Migas
- Rav Nehemiah
- Rav Avdimi

== 7th century ==
- Nehemiah ben Hushiel (615–617)

== The Land of Israel Gaonate ==
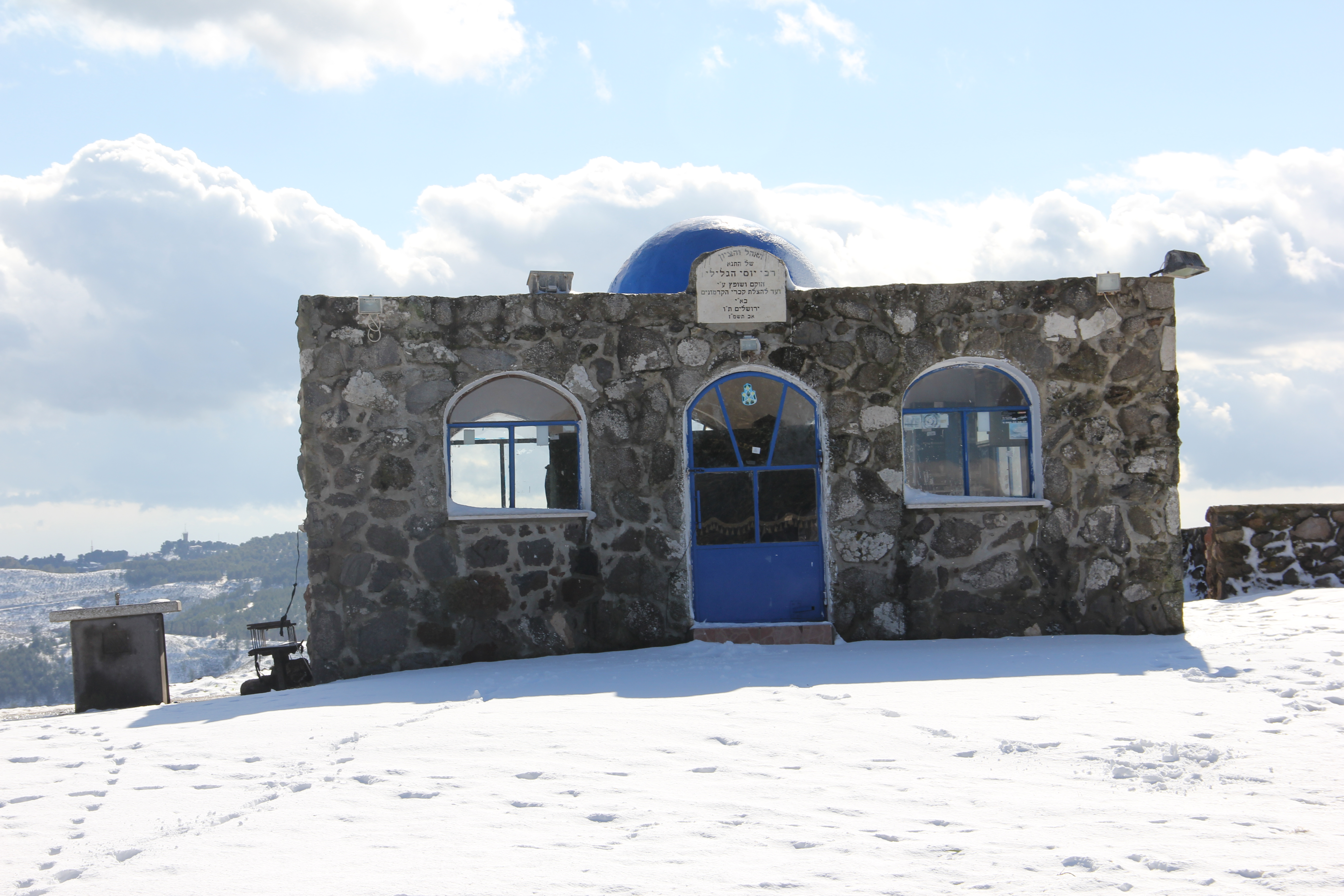
Tomb of Rabbi Jose the Galilean where Rabbi Eliyahu HaCohen Gaon was later buried next to him on Dalton mountain. The ceremony of his burial there, is described in the Avitar scroll.

The Land of Israel Gaonate (Hebrew: ישיבת ארץ ישראל, romanץized: Yeshivat Eretz Israel) was the chief talmudical academy and central legalistic body of the Jewish community in the land of Israel, until the 11th century. It was considered the central leadership authority of the Jews of Palestine (region), Syria, Lebanon and Egypt during the Geonim period and as the successor of the Sanhedrin institution and hence it served as an authority for the Jews of the Diaspora as well.

- Pinchas HaCohen, (8th century)
- Zemach ben Josiah
- Yehoshaphat ben Josiah, (born in the 9th century, a descendant of Anan ben David)
- Aaron ben Meïr (920)
- abraham ben Aaron ben Meïr (960) - Jerusalem.
- Yosef ben Menachem HaCohen Sjalemsi (990–1025) - Ramla.
- Shlomo ben Yehuda (1025–1051)
- Daniel ben Azariah (1051–1061)
- Eliyahu HaCohen (1062–1083)- Jerusalem, Tyre
- Abiathar ben Elijah ha-Cohen (1084–1109)

== "The Rishon LeZion" (17th century-1918) ==
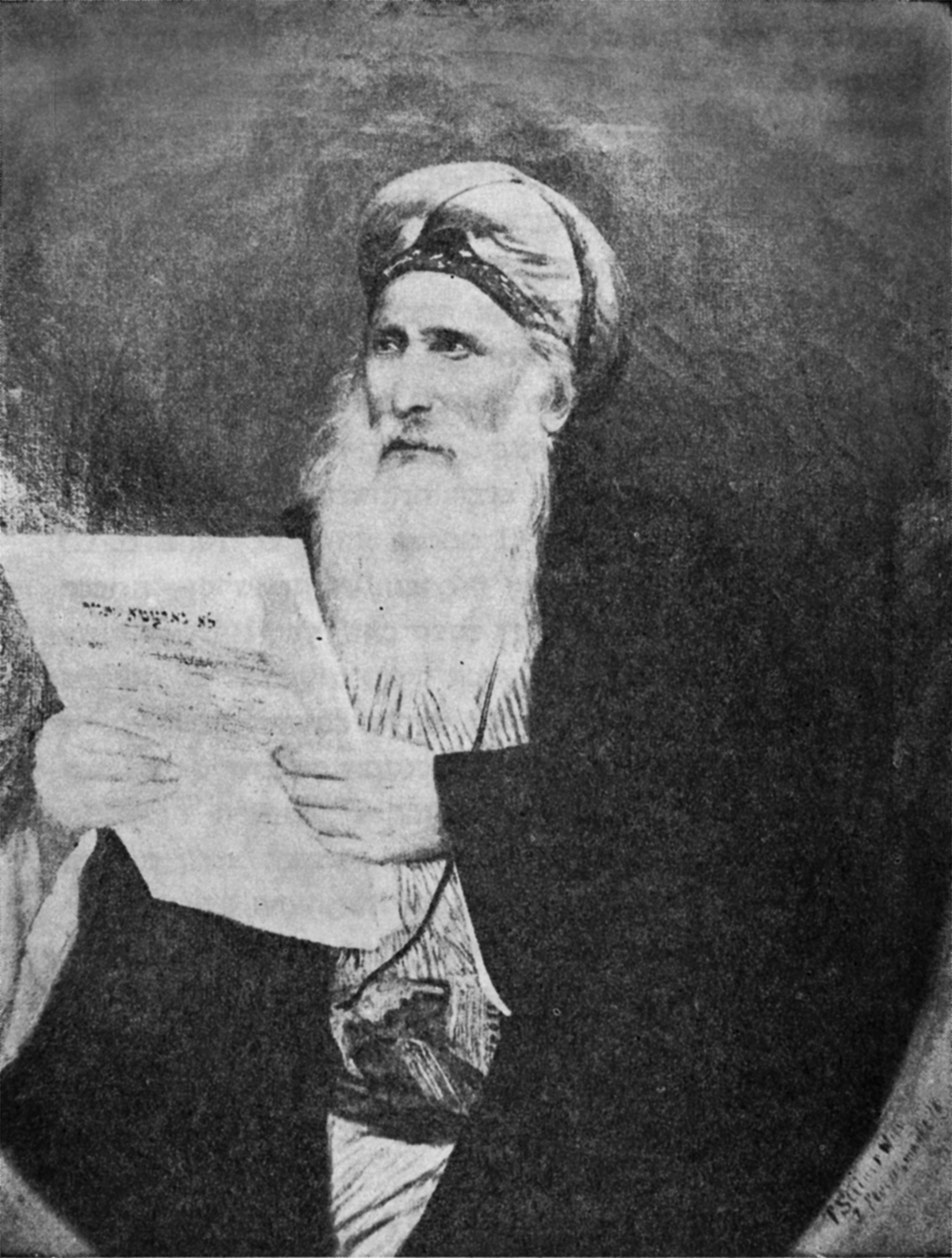
Rabbi Raphael Meir Panigel, "The Rishon LeZion", The 28th

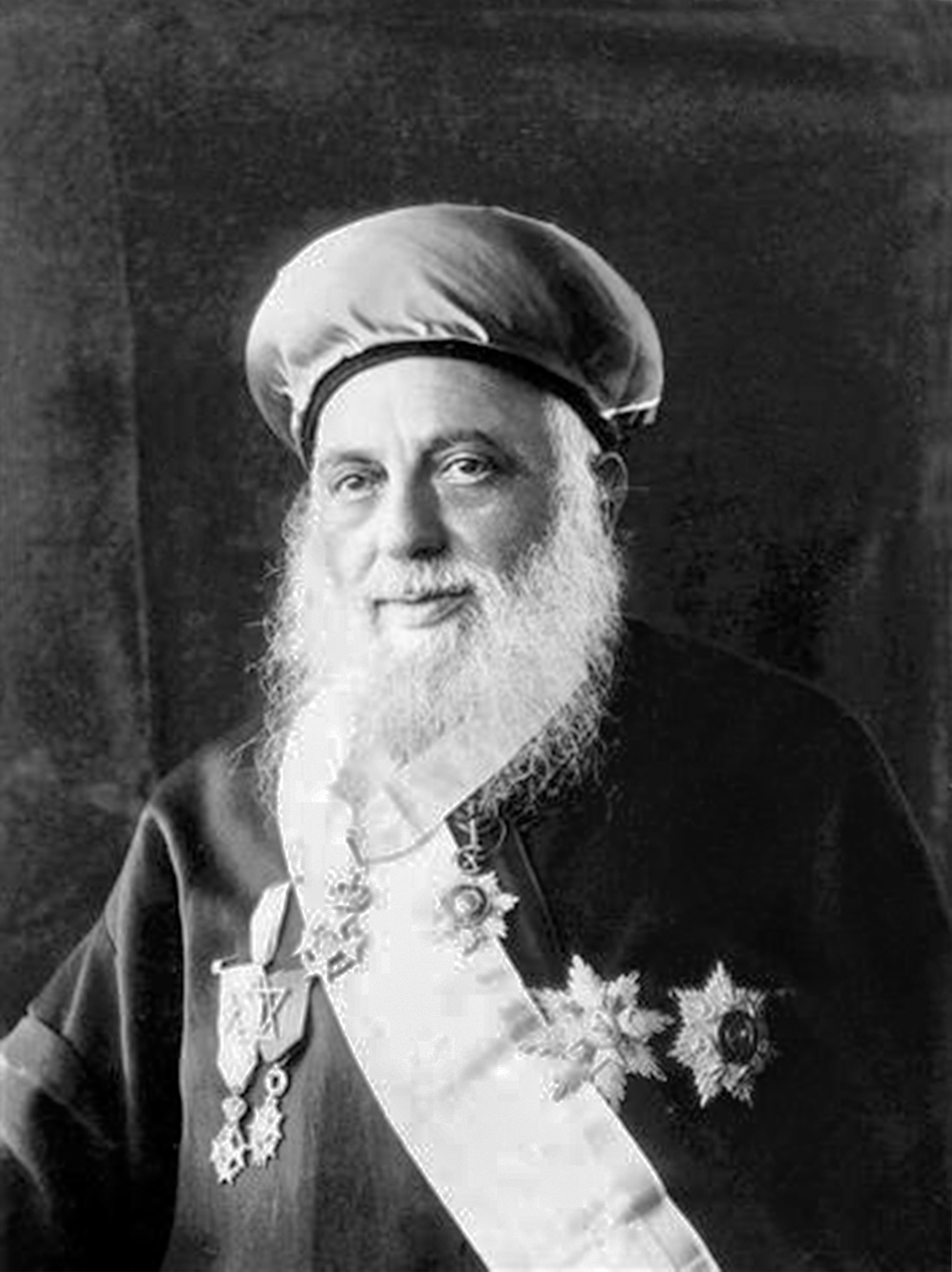
Rabbi Jacob Meir, "The Rishon LeZion" The 30th.

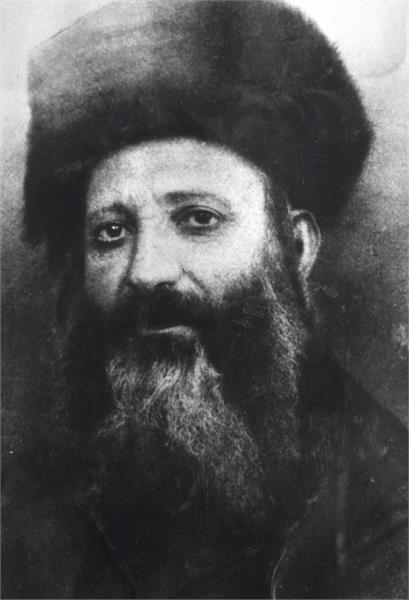
Rabbi Abraham Isaac Kook, the first Ashkenazi Chief Rabbi of British Mandatory Palestine.

The rabbis who served as the spiritual leader of the Sephardic community in the Land of Israel from the mid-17th century. The Hebrew title for the position called: "The Rishon LeZion" (literally "First to Zion") and was officially recognized by the Ottoman Empire which ruled the region as the Hakham Bashi - the Ottoman Turkish name for the Chief Rabbi of the nation's Jewish community.

- Moshe ben Yonatan Galante (b. Safed), (Note: The place of birth of the personality.) (Note: The name of the hometown of the personality is indicated in parentheses and not the name of the country because the names of the countries today are not the same as the names of the countries at that time.) Appointed - (1664) (Note: In parentheses is the year of appointment to the position.)
- Moshe ibn Habib (b. Thessaloniki), Appointed - (1689)
- Abraham Rovigo (came from Italy), Appointed - (1702)
- Avraham ben David Yitzchaki (b. Jerusalem), Appointed - (1715)
- Binyamin HaCohen maali (b. Ḥalab), Appointed - (1722)
- Eliezer Ben Yaakov Nachum (b. İzmir), Appointed - (c. 1730)
- Nissim Chaim Moshe Mizrachi (b. Jerusalem), Appointed - (1745)
- Isaac HaKohen Rapoport (b. Jerusalem), Appointed - (1749)
- Israel Yaakov Algazi (b. İzmir), Appointed - (c. 1754)
- Raphael Shmuel Meyuchas (b. Jerusalem), Appointed - (1756)
- Chaim Raphael Avraham Ben Asher (b. Jerusalem), A- (1771)
- Yom Tov Algazi (b. İzmir), Appointed - (1773)
- Moshe Yosef Mordechai Meyuchas (b. Jerusalem), A - (1802)
- Yaakov Moshe Ayash al-Maghrebi (b. Algiers), Appointed - (1806)
- Yaakov Koral (b. Safed), Appointed - (1817)
- Raphael Yosef Hazan (b. İzmir), Appointed - (1819)
- Yom Tov Danon (b. İzmir), Appointed - (1821)
- Shlomo Moses Suzin (b. Jerusalem or Hebron), Appointed - (1824)
- Yonah Moshe Navon (b. Jerusalem), Appointed - (1836)
- Yehuda ben Raphael Navon (b. Jerusalem), Appointed - (1841)
- Avraham Haim Gaggin (b. Constantinople), Appointed - (1842)
- Yitzhak Kovo (b. Jerusalem), Appointed - (1848)
- Haim Abulafia (b. Tiberias), Appointed - (1854)
- Haim Hazzan (b. İzmir) (1860)
- Avraham Ashkenazi (b. Larissa) (1869)
- Raphael Meir Panigel (b. Pazardzhik), Appointed - (1880)
- Yaakov Shaul Elyashar (b. Safed), Appointed - (1893)
- Yaakov Meir (b. Jerusalem), Appointed - (1906)
- Eliyahu Moshe Panigel (b. Jerusalem), Appointed - (1907)
- Nahman Batito (b. Marrakesh), Appointed - (1908)
- Moshe Yehuda Franco (b. Rhodes), Appointed - (1912)
- Nissim Yehuda Danon (b. Jerusalem), Appointed: 1915–1918. In 1917, Palestine was conquered by the British. Danon was succeeded as chief rabbi after World War I by Haim Moshe Elyashar (b. Jerusalem) who assumed the title of Acting Chief Rabbi 1918–1921. (For a list of Chief Rabbis during the Mandate and afterwards, see List of chief rabbis of Israel and Mandatory Palestine. They controlled religious affairs while the Jewish National Council (Vaad Leumi) controlled civil affairs, as defined by a British Mandatory Ordinance).

== Jewish National Council (1917–1948) ==
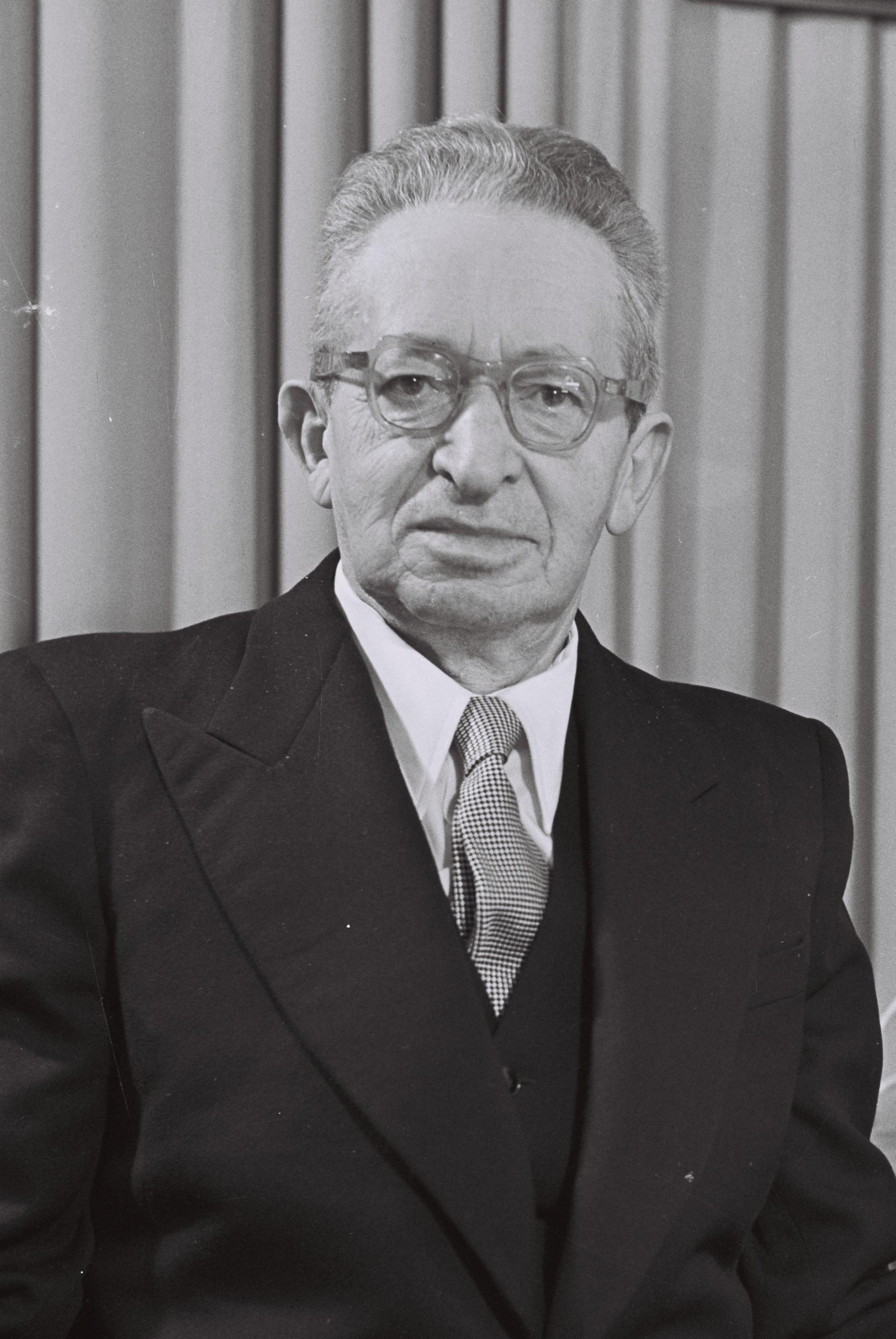
Yitzhak Ben Zvi, chairman of the Jewish National Council, 1931–1948

The following list contains the elected chairmen of the Jewish National Council.

- Yaacov Thon (b. Ukraine) 1917–1920 – head of a provisional council which preceded the actual formation of the Vaad Leumi in 1920.
- David Yellin 1920–1929 (b. Jerusalem)
- Pinhas Rutenberg (b. Ukraine) 1929–1931
- Yitzhak Ben Zvi (b. Ukraine) – elected as chairman in the 1931 elections, held the office until independence in 1948. In 1939, Pinhas Rutenberg was, once again, appointed chairman of the Va'ad while Ben Zvi became president. He held that position until his death in 1942. In the 1944 elections, *David Remez (b. Ukraine), was elected as chairman while Ben Zvi continued with the title of president.

== State of Israel (1948–present) ==
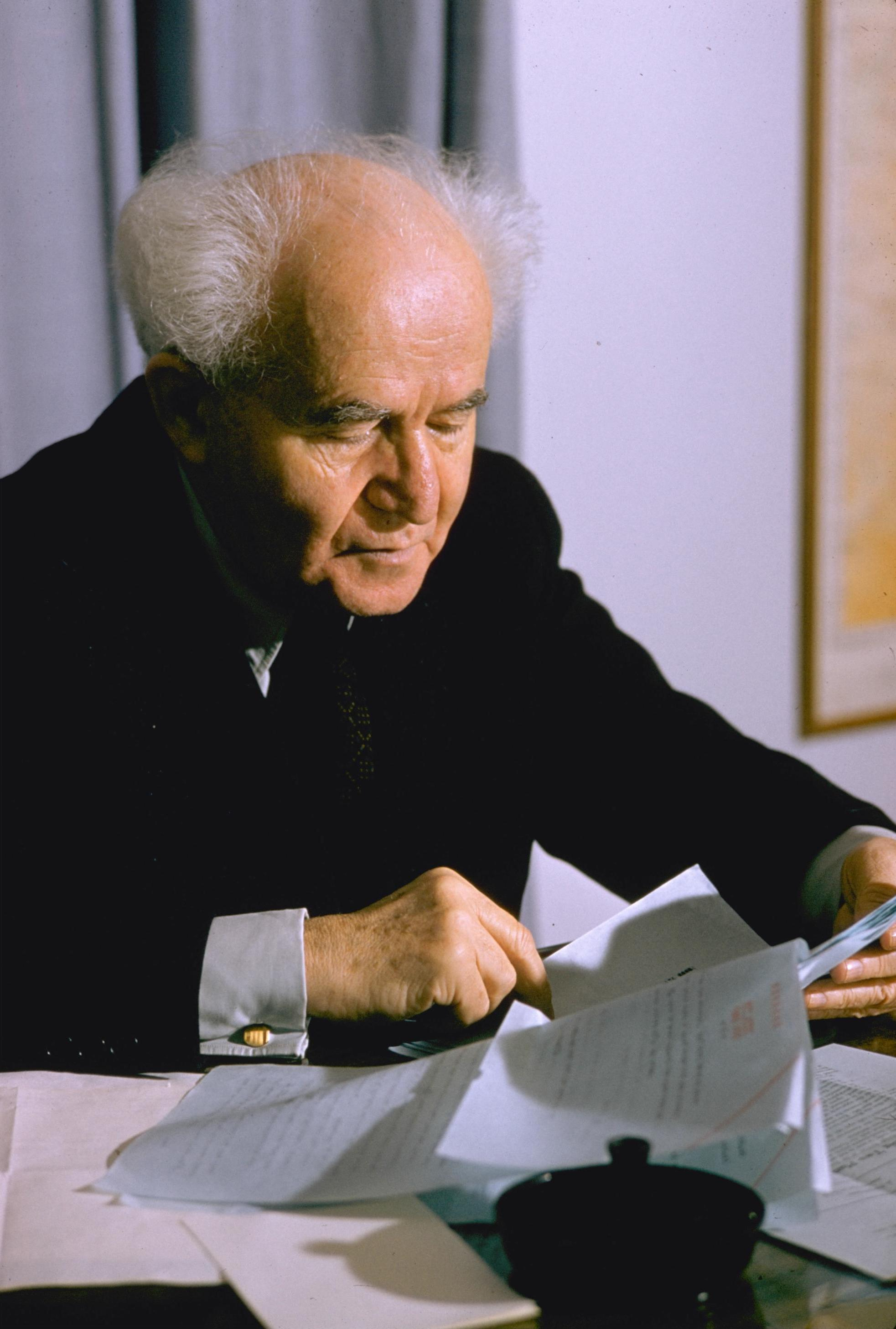
David Ben-Gurion the first prime minister of Israel 1948.

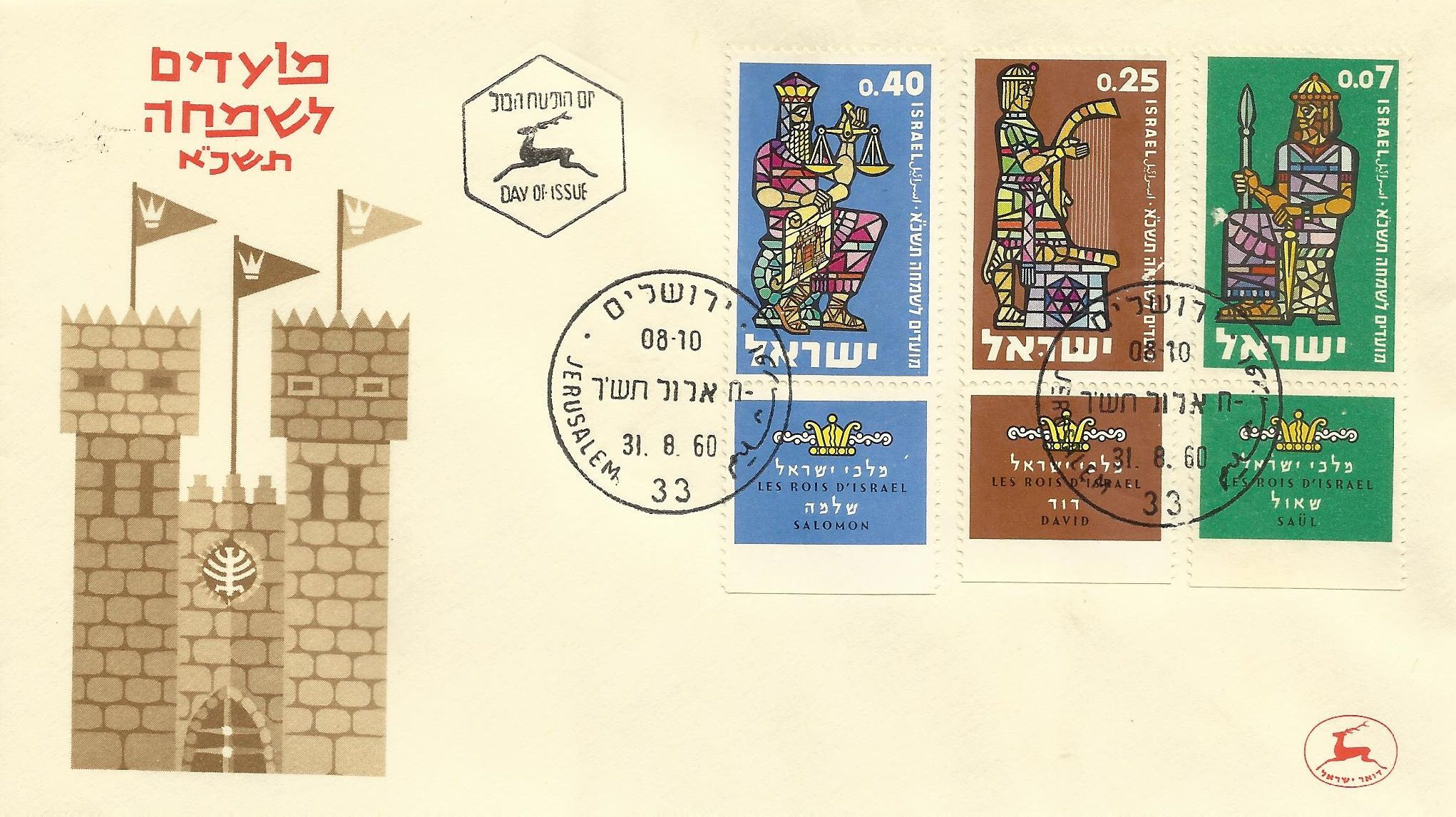
First day of issue - The 1960 series of stamps for joyous occasions, including the ancient kings of Israel Shaul, David and Solomon.

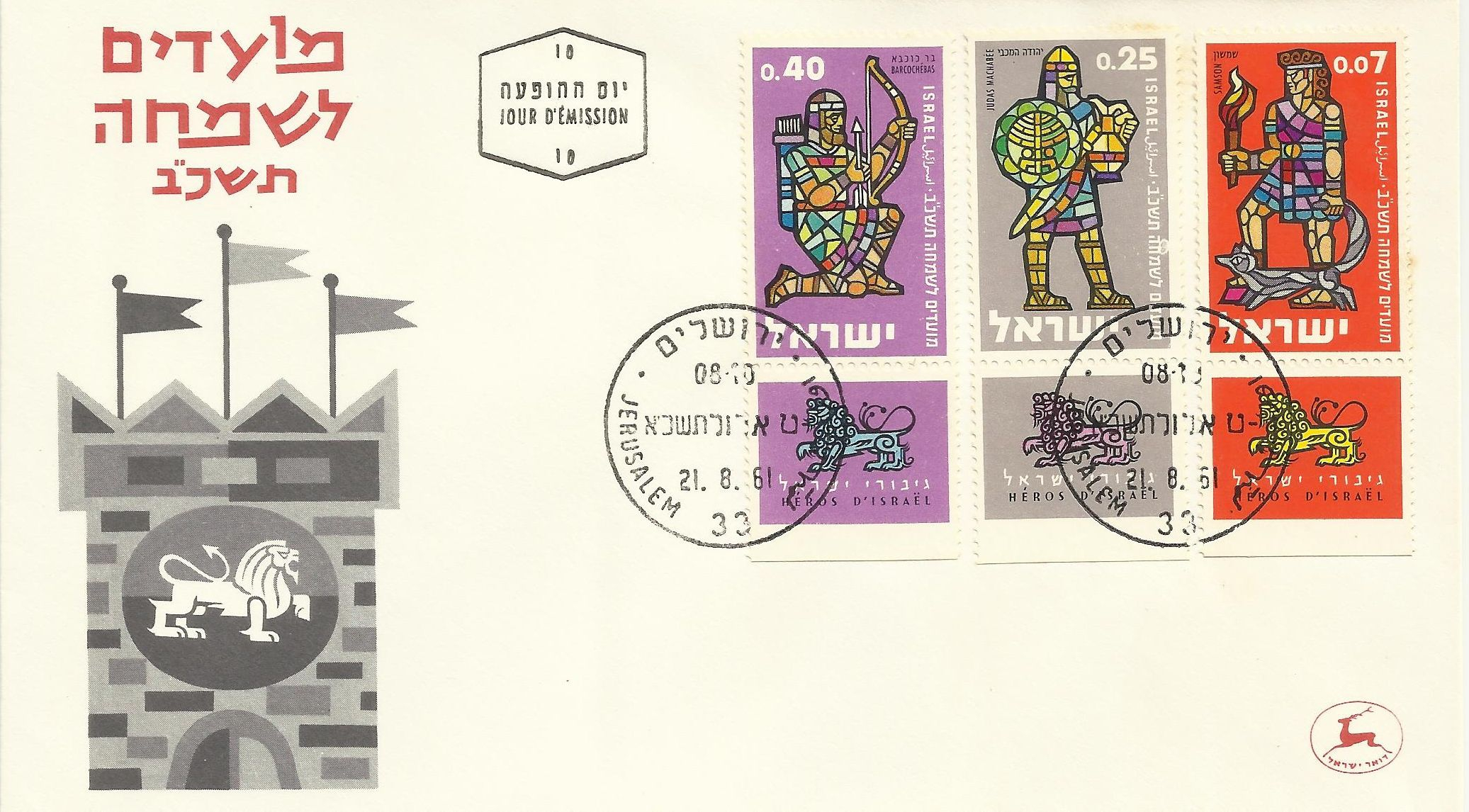
First day of issue - The 1961 series of stamps for joyous occasions, including ancient heroes of Israel: Samson, Judas Maccabeus and Bar Kokhba.

- David Ben-Gurion (b. Poland, then-Russian Empire) 1948–1953, 1955–1963
- Moshe Sharett (b. Ukraine, then-Russian Empire) 1953–1955
- Levi Eshkol (b. Ukraine, then-Russian Empire) 1963–1969
- Golda Meir who came from Ukraine via the United States 1969–1974
- Yitzhak Rabin (b. Mandatory Palestine) 1974–1977, 1992–1995
- Menachem Begin (b. Belarus, then-Russian Empire) 1977–1983
- Yitzhak Shamir (b. Poland, then-Russian Empire) 1983–1984, 1986–1992
- Shimon Peres (b. Poland, then-Russian Empire) 1984–1986, 1995–1996
- Ehud Barak (b. Mandatory Palestine) 1999–2001
- Ariel Sharon (b. Mandatory Palestine) 2001–2006
- Ehud Olmert (b. Mandatory Palestine) 2006–2009
- Naftali Bennett (b. Israel) 2021–2022
- Yair Lapid (b. Israel) 2022
- Benjamin Netanyahu (b. Israel) 1996–1999, 2009–2021, 2022–present

== See also ==
- Jewish leadership
- Kings of Israel and Judah
- History of the Jews and Judaism in the Land of Israel
