= Chief Rabbi of Jerusalem =

Political position

The position of Chief Rabbi of Jerusalem was instituted centuries ago and was originally held by a member of the Sephardic community. Moses Galante served as Rishon LeZion, the title used from beginning of the 17th century to refer to the chief rabbi of Jerusalem. In 1878, the Ashkenazi community appointed their own representative. Since then, Jerusalem has had two chief rabbis, each representing their respective communities.

In the second decade of the twentieth century the zionist and anti-zionist factions each appointed rival candidates to the position, which coalesced into the state-sponsored Chief Rabbinate on the one hand, and the Chief Rabinates of the Ashkenazic and Sephardic Edahs HaChareidis on the other.

Since the establishment of the State of Israel, the function of the state-sponsored chief rabbi includes representing the city in high level diplomatic meetings and important ceremonies. The position can be held until the age of 75 but can be extended till the age of 80.

== Official Ashkenazic representation ==
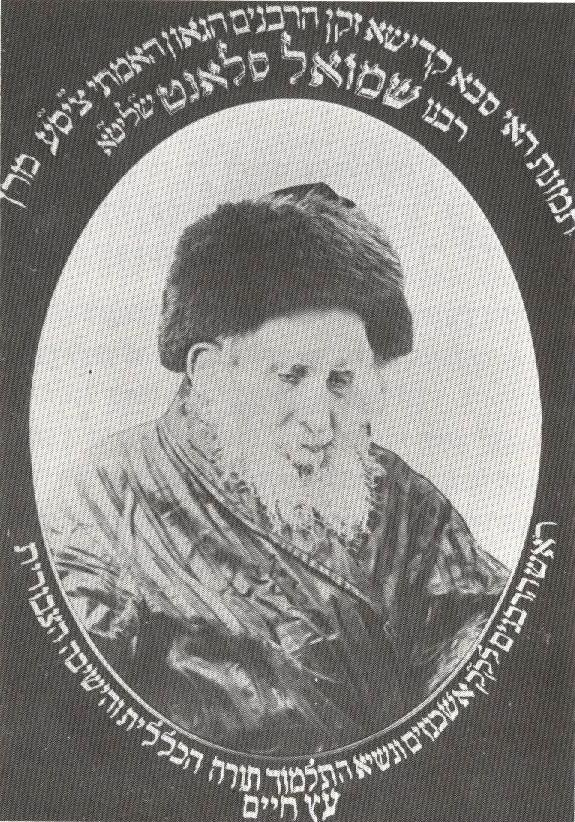
Rabbi Shmuel Salant

Although an informal Ashkenazi rabbinical court existed in Jerusalem from 1837 with Zundel Salant at its helm, it was not until 1841 that his son-in-law, Shmuel Salant, opened a proper Beis Din in a room at the Hurva complex. In 1860, Salant appointed Meir Aurbach to replace him as chief rabbi. Upon his death in 1878, the post returned to Salant who held it until his death in 1909. Through his efforts after he retook office in 1878, Salant was able to procure the dignities previously granted by the Ottoman government only to the Sephardim, for the Ashkenazim as well. He became the first official Ashkenazic Chief Rabbi of Jerusalem.

At the turn of the 20th century, an aging Salant approached Yosef Chaim Zonnenfeld to assist him, but he refused the offer. In 1898 a letter was sent to Chaim Ozer Grodzinski of Vilna requesting his advice in the matter. This resulted in Eliyahu David Rabinowitz-Teomim being appointed in 1901 as chief rabbi. However, Rabinowitz-Teomim predeceased him in 1905 aged 62. Four years later Salant died aged 93, and Chaim Berlin of Moscow, son of the Netziv, took the position. Berlin died 3 years later in 1912. With Zonnenfeld still refusing to take up the offer and another candidate, Yitzchak Yerucham Diskin choosing to remain director of the Diskin Orphanage, the position was unfilled.

Abraham Isaac Kook, rabbi of Jaffa until 1914, became Chief Rabbi of Jerusalem for the zionist camp in 1919. In 1921 he established the Chief Rabbinate for the Jewish community in Palestine. He remained chief rabbi until his death in 1935. In opposition, Zonnenfeld accepted the title from the anti-zionist camp, and the Edah HaChareidis was established. Thus there remained two offices, both claiming personal jurisdiction over Ashkenazic Jewry in Jerusalem. The following deals with the state-sponsored Rabinate, the anti-zionist Rabinate will be discussed separately.

In 1936 Tzvi Pesach Frank was elected Ashkenazi chief rabbi of Jerusalem, and held the position until his death in 1960. Yitzchak Kolitz was appointed the city's Ashkenazi chief rabbi in 1983. Aryeh Stern replaced him on October 22, 2014 after the position had been vacant for eleven years following the passing of Kolitz in 2003. Shlomo Amar was simultaneously elected the Sephardi chief rabbi.

== Current election process ==
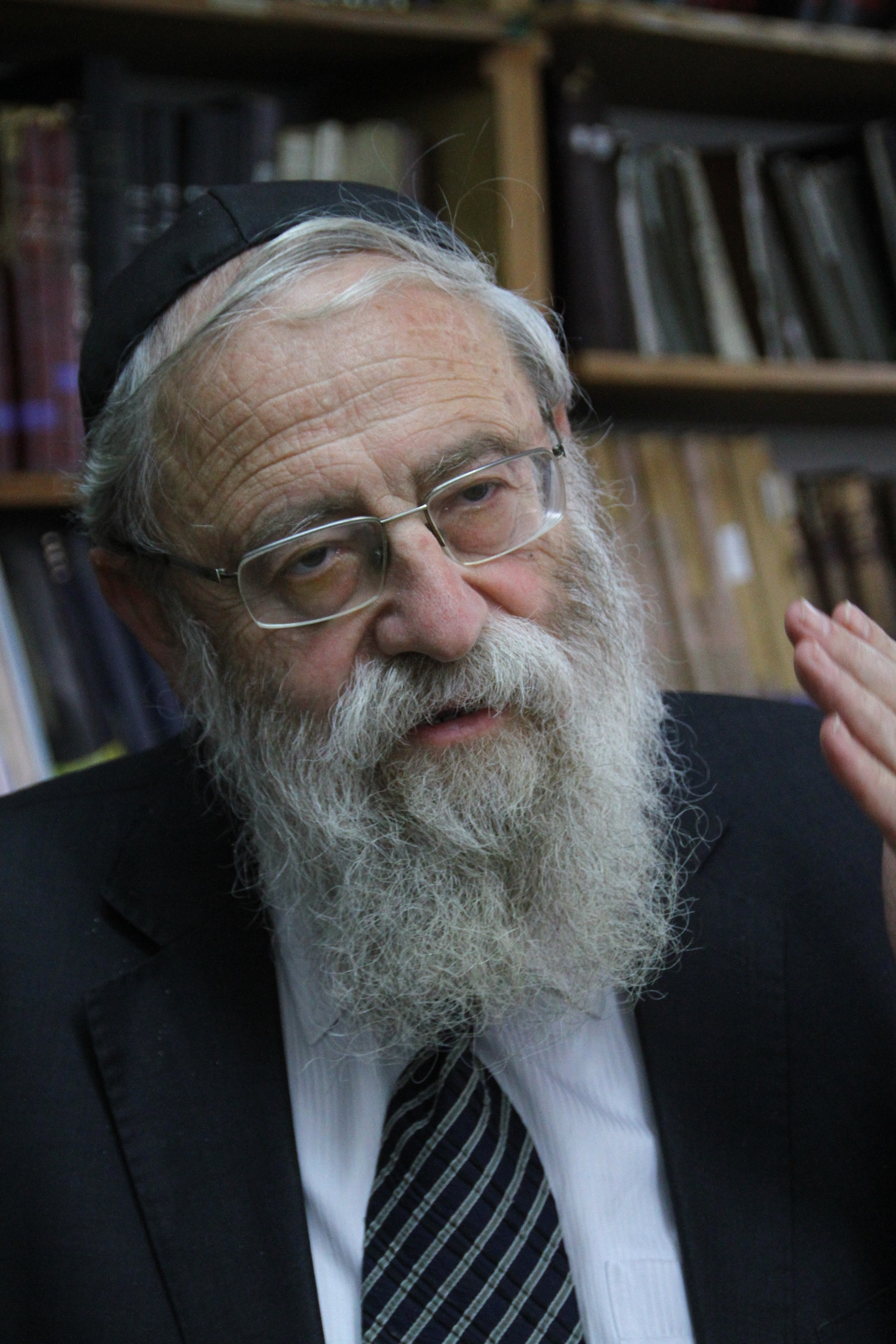
Rabbi Aryeh Stern

In 2003–2014 there was no Chief Rabbi of Jerusalem and the election process is proving controversial. In dispute is the process that brought about the creation of a 24-man body that represents Jerusalem's synagogues. This is half of the 48-person electoral body responsible for choosing the two rabbis. Presently, the 24-man body is made up of 19 haredi representatives and five religious Zionists.

The vote resulted with the election of Rabbi Aryeh Stern with a majority of 27 of the 48 representatives from the city's synagogues, city councils, and voters appointed by Naftali Bennett. He had been elected the candidate of the Religious Zionism sector in 2009. Jerusalem mayor Nir Barkat was against the appointment of two Haredi chief rabbis and wanted one of the elected rabbis to belong to the religious Zionist stream of Judaism. He stated that "the chief rabbi has an important role as representative of the city and its citizens. He must be a figure engaged in issues connected to all segments of the city's population and understand the needs of the entire population that receives religious services." "It is only proper that the chief rabbis of the capital be chosen in a democratic way that reflects the population. Therefore, I am pushing for the creation of an electoral body... that represents the true makeup of the Jerusalem's Jewish populatuon: two third general population, a third haredi." Others had suggested that the citizens of Jerusalem elect the rabbis themselves. Upon his election, Rabbi Stern said, "It is in my intention to serve as the rabbi of all Jerusalemites: secular, modern-orthodox and charedi alike. The Jerusalem rabbinate is a great merit, but it also comprises a hefty responsibility. I will make sure that the religious services will become accessible and friendly and will serve as an outstanding model for all of the other rabbinates in Israel".

== The Edah Hachareidis ==
Main Article Edah HaChareidis

The Edah HaChareidis established its independent chief rabbinate in 1919 as an ideological fortress against the nascent Chief Rabbinate led by Rabbi Abraham Isaac Kook. While Rabbi Kook sought to bridge traditional Judaism with the burgeoning Zionist movement, the Edah’s founders—led by Rabbi Yosef Chaim Sonnenfeld—viewed any cooperation with Zionism as a spiritual betrayal. They sucssesfully petitioned the British Government to be formally seceded from the zionist Jerusalem Community Council to ensure their institutions, courts, and kashrus remained entirely free from the influence of the "Zionist-sanctioned" rabbinate. This split created a permanent religious divide in Jerusalem, positioning the Edah as the uncompromising guardian of "Old Yishuv" traditionalism in direct defiance of Rabbi Kook’s nationalistic religious vision. A separate Edah for Sephardic Jewry was later also established. Both Edahs maintain a separate office of chief rabbi to the present day.

the following lists the chief rabbis of the Ashkenazic Edah, Known as the Ga'avad. The Ga'avad holds three titles: Grand Patriarch of the Court of Jerusalem, Chief Rabbi of Jerusalem, and Master of the Land of Israel.

1. 1920–1932: Rabbi Yosef Chaim Sonnenfeld (1849–1932)
2. 1932–1948: Grand Rabbi Yosef Tzvi Dushinsky, First Dushinsky Rebbe (1867–1948)
3. 1947–1953: Rabbi Zelig Reuven Bengis (1864–1953)
4. 1953–1979: Grand Rabbi Joel Teitelbaum of Satmar (1887–1979)<
5. 1979–1989: Rabbi Yitzchok Yaakov Weiss (1901–1989; author of Minchas Yitzchak, formerly of Manchester Beth Din, England)
6. 1989–1996: Rabbi Moshe Aryeh Freund (1904–1996; author of Ateres Yehoshua (Chassidei Satmar)
7. 1996–2002: Grand Rabbi Yisroel Moshe Dushinsky, Second Dushinsky Rebbe (1921–2003; son of Rabbi Yosef Tzvi Dushinsky, listed above)
8. 2002–2022: Rabbi Yitzchok Tuvia Weiss (1926–2022; formerly dayan of the Machsike Hadass community, Antwerp, Belgium)

== List ==
=== Sephardi ===
==== 16th century ====
- Levi Ibn Habib
- David ben Solomon ibn Abi Zimra
- Moshe ben Mordechai Galante
- Haim Vital
- Bezalel Ashkenazi
- Gedaliah Cordovero
- Yitzhak Gaon (?)
- Israel Benjamin
- Yaacov Tzemah
- Shemuel Garmison

==== 17th century ====
- Moshe Ibn Habib (1689–1696)
- Moshe Hayun

==== 18th century ====
- Abraham ben David Yitzchaki (1715–1722)
- Binyamin Maali
- Elazar ben Yaacob Nahum (1730–1748)
- Nissim Mizrahi (1748–1754)
- Israel Yaacob Algazy (1754–1756)
- Haim Raphael Abraham ben Asher (1771–1772)
- Yom Tov Algazi (1772–1802)

==== 19th century ====
- Moshe Yosef Mordechai Meyuchas (1802–1805)
- Yaacob Moshe Ayash al-Maghrebi (1806–1817)
- Jacob Coral (1817–1819)
- Yosef ben Hayyim Hazan (1819–1822)
- Yom Tov Danon (1822–1824)
- Salomon Moshe Suzin (1824–1836)
- Yonah Moshe Navon (1836–1841)
- Yehudah ben Raphael Navon (1841–1842)
- Haim Nissim Abulafia (1854–1861)
- Haim David Hazan (1861–1869)
- Avraham Ashkenazi (1869–1880)
- Raphael Meir Panigel (1880–1892)
- Yaacob Shaul Elyashar (1893–1906)

==== 20th century to present ====
- Eliyah Moshe Panigel (1907–1909)
- Nahman Batito (1909–1911)
- Moshe Yehuda Franco (1911–1915)
- Haim Moshe Elyashar (1914–1915)
- Nissim Yehudah Danon (1915–1921)
- Chalom Messas (1978–2003)
- Shlomo Amar (2014–present)

=== Ashkenazi ===
==== 19th century ====
- Meir Auerbach (1860–1871/8)
- Shmuel Salant (1871/8–1909)

==== 20th century to present ====
- Chaim Berlin (1909–1912?)
- Abraham Isaac Kook (1919–1935)
- Tzvi Pesach Frank (1936–1960)
- Bezalel Zolty (1977–1982)
- Yitzhak Kolitz (1983–2002)
- Aryeh Stern (2014–2026)

== See also ==
- Grand Mufti of Jerusalem
- Patriarch of Jerusalem (disambiguation)
- Edah HaChareidis
