= List of Sephardi chief rabbis of the Land of Israel =

This list of Sephardi chief rabbis of the Land of Israel documents the rabbis who served as the spiritual leader of the Sephardic community in the Land of Israel from the mid-17th century to present. The Hebrew title for the position, Rishon LeZion (literally "First to Zion"), has been used since the beginning of the 17th century, and is sourced from a verse in Isaiah 41:27. Between 1842 and 1920 the position of Hakham Bashi of the Vilayet of Damascus was officially recognised by the Ottoman and British governments. As of 2026, David Yosef is the current Chief Rabbi.

List of Sephardi chief rabbis of the Land of Israel
Name	Image	Term	Birthplace
Moshe ben Yonatan Galante		1665–1689	Safed
Moshe ibn Habib		1689–1696	Salonika
Avraham Ben David Yitzhaki		1709–1729	
Eliezer Ben Yaakov Nachum		c. 1730	Istanbul
Nissim Chaim Moshe Mizrachi		1745–1749	Jerusalem
Israel Yaakov Algazi		c. 1754	Smyrna
Raphael Shmuel Meyuchas		1756–1771	Jerusalem
Chaim Raphael Avraham Ben Asher		1771–1772	Europe
Raphael Moshe Bula		1772–1773	Salonika
Yom Tov Algazi		1773–1802	Smyrna
Moshe Yosef Mordechai Meyuchas		1802–1806	Jerusalem
Yaakov Moshe Ayash al-Maghrebi		1806–1817	Algiers
Yaakov Koral		1817–1818	Safed
Yosef ben Hayyim Hazan		1819–1821	Smyrna
Yom Tov Danon		1822–1823	Smyrna
Shlomo Moses Suzin		1824–1836	Hebron
Yonah Moshe Navon		1836–1841	Jerusalem
Yehuda ben Raphael Navon		1841–1842	Jerusalem
Chaim Avraham Gagin		1842–1848	Constantinople
Yitzhak Kovo		1848–1854	Salonika
Chaim Nissim Abulafia		1854–1861	Tiberias
Chaim David Hazan		1861–1869	Smyrna
Avraham Ashkenazi		1869–1880	Salonika
Raphael Meir Panigel		1880–1892	Pazardzhik
Yaakov Shaul Elyashar		1893–1906	Safed
Yaakov Meir		1906	Jerusalem
Eliyahu Moshe Panigel		1907	Jerusalem
Nachman Batito		1909–1911	Marrakesh
Moshe Yehuda Franco		1911–1915	Rhodes
Haim Moshe Elyashar		1914–1915	Jerusalem
Nissim Yehuda Danon		1915–?	Jerusalem
Yaakov Meir		1921–1939	Jerusalem
Ben-Zion Meir Hai Uziel		1939–1954	Jerusalem
Yitzhak Nissim		1955–1972	Baghdad
Ovadia Yosef		1973–1983	Baghdad
Mordechai Eliyahu		1983–1993	Jerusalem
Eliyahu Bakshi-Doron		1993–2003	Jerusalem
Shlomo Amar		2003–2013	Casablanca
Yitzhak Yosef		2013–2024	Jerusalem
David Yosef		2024–present	Jerusalem

== See also ==
- Land of Israel Gaonate
- List of Jewish leaders in the Land of Israel
- Sephardic Chief Rabbi Official Dress
- Chief Rabbi of Jerusalem
- Old Yishuv
