= Nissim Chaim Moshe Mizrachi =

18th-century Rishon LeZion

Nissi Chaim Moshe Mizrachi

Rishon LeZion
- In office 1744–1749
- Preceded by: Eliezer ben Yaakov Nachum
- Succeeded by: Israel Yaakov Algazi

Personal life
- Born: c. 1690 Jerusalem, Ottoman Empire
- Died: June 20, 1749 (aged about 59)
- Children: At least 2
- Parent: Yosef Mizrachi (father)

Religious life
- Religion: Judaism

Jewish leader
- Yahrtzeit: 4 Tammuz

Nissim Chaim Moshe Mizrachi (Hebrew: ניסים חיים משה מזרחי; c. 1690 – June 20, 1749) was an 18th-century rabbi in Jerusalem and was a Rishon LeZion in the Land of Israel.

== Early life ==
Mizrachi was born in Jerusalem around 1690 to Yosef Mizrachi, the chief Shochet in the city. He is a descendant of Rabbi Baruch Mizrachi (otherwise known as Baruch ben David el-Mashreki, who immigrated to Jerusalem from elsewhere in the Ottoman Empire in 1620). Orphaned at a young age, he was raised by his brother, Rabbi Yisrael Meir, who was the author of the Peri Ha'aretz. They studied together at Yeshivat Beit Yaakov Ferreira. Yisrael later would marry Nissim's daughter and become his son-in-law as well. His first wife died in 1738, and the second in 1745. He was the brother-in-law to Rabbi Raphael Shlomo Havdalah. In addition to his daughter/sister-in-law, he had a son, Yosef Menachem, who died at age 23.

== Career ==
On two separate occasions, Mizrachi was arrested by the Ottoman authorities. He was held under a ransom, forcing the Jewish community to pay debts to the government. His original name was Moshe, and the names Chaim and Nissim were added to his name later on during this time, meaning "life" and "miracle" respectively, in hopes that he would come back to the community alive.

In 1744–1745, he was appointed to be the Sephardi chief rabbi in the Land of Israel. He held the position for around four years, ending at his death. During his tenure, he enacted many laws based on Halakha, including a ruling that unmarried men between 20 and 60 weren't permitted to live in the city. He was the author of a series of responsa called the Admat Kodesh. He was considered a great posek and was praised by his contemporaries for his knowledge of rabbinic law.

Among his students was Rabbi Jonah Nabon, and he was additionally affiliated with Isaac HaKohen Rapoport.

== Death ==
He died on the eve of Shabbat, June 20th, 1749. He was buried in the Mount of Olives Jewish Cemetery, next to his brother, and also next to Chaim ibn Attar. His Yahrzeit is on the 4th of Tammuz.
