= Shlomo Moshe Suzin =

Rishon LeZion (died 1835)

Rabbi Shlomo Moshe Suzin
- שלמה משה סוזין

Personal life
- Born: Ottoman Empire
- Died: September 19, 1835 Jerusalem, Ottoman Empire
- Resting place: Mount of Olives Jewish Cemetery

Religious life
- Religion: Judaism
- Sect: Sephardic Judaism

Senior posting
- Predecessor: Yom-Tov Danon
- Successor: Yonah Moshe Navon
- Position: Rishon LeZion

Rabbi Shlomo Moshe Suzin (Hebrew: שלמה משה סוזין; died December 19, 1835) was a Rishon LeZion in the Land of Israel.

== Early life ==
Suzin was likely born in Jerusalem, but grew up in Hebron and may have been born there as well. His father was Rabbi Eliezer Suzin. He was a member of the Beir El Kabbalist Yeshiva and worked extensively for the Jewish community in the Land of Israel, who went through many hardships during his period of work. In 1778, he traveled to Anatolia as a doctor on behalf of the community of Hebron, and in 1802, travelled to Tripoli, Libya on behalf of Jerusalem. In 1808, with the help of an anonymous benefactor, he established the Bnei Moshe Yeshiva and was its head. That same year, he went on a mission to Tunis.

== Career and works ==
He was appointed Rishon LeZion in 1824. He was elected following the death of Rabbi Yom Tov Danon, although the seat was vacant for about a year. In 1826, he went on a mission again to North Africa, even though he was already serving in his current position. Rabbi Hezekiah Avraham HaCohen served along him in the Beit Din, as well as Rabbi Yehuda Navon, who would later hold his title as well.

None of his writings were ever brought to print in his lifetime, but many of his responsa were printed in books of his generation, including Hakakei Lev of Haim Palachi, Laws of Life by Chaim Abraham Gagin, and Hikrei Lev by Yosef Raphael Chazan. Aryeh Leib Frumkin wrote that he had a large commentary on the Torah, but did not mention its contents. The beginning of The Regulations of Jerusalem printed his responsum on the regulation of estates, and there he praises Jerusalem and its sages. His Haskamas are found in many books, and as early as 1788, he gave an approval on the book Avodat HaTamid. His handwritten notebook is preserved in the National Library of Israel.

He is alleged to have said "Karaites can never be our [Sephardim's] brothers", but the attribution has been disputed.

=== Relationship with the Ashkenazi community ===
The Ashkenazi Jewish community was renewing in the city with the Old Yishuv movement, and was headed at the time by Rabbi Menachem Mendel of Shklov. Shklov and Suzin, despite leading opposite sects in the city, respected each other and had a good working relationship. Following the development of Ashkenazi settlement in Jerusalem, the Ashkenazim began to claim their share of the money from the endowments donated by European Jews to the Land of Israel. They also began to send medical supplies to various countries on their behalf. This new situation created disputes, and Suzin helped create a compromise for how funds were distributed.

== Death ==
Suzin died on December 19, 1835, and was buried in the Sephardic Rabbinical section of the Mount of Olives Jewish Cemetery next to the other Rishon LeZion Rabbi Raphael Moshe Bula. His gravestone reads:

Zion in bitter weeping rivers for generations, to the lesson of the ark of God. Our Lord and Rabbi, Zion of all splendor, Moshe, the man of God, the Rabbi of the Diaspora, the remnants of the Great Assembly, the greatest of counsel and the great Zion of our Festivals, has become a mourning for our sickness. The crown of our head has fallen, our teacher and rabbi stood in the burst of Jerusalem, a reliable leader, our father, our king, King Shlomo Moshe Suzin z"l

He was supposed to have been succeeded by Chaim Abraham Gagin, but he was considered to young, so Yonah Moshe Navon succeeded him instead, with Gagin serving two terms after Navon.
