= Yaakov Moshe Ayash =

Rishon LeZion 1727–1817)

Rabbi Yaakov Moshe Ayash
- יעקב משה עייאש
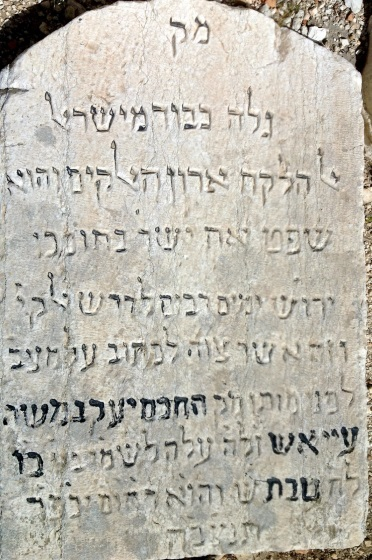
- Ayash's gravestone

Personal life
- Born: 1727 Algiers, Ottoman Empire
- Died: January 14, 1817 (aged 89-90) Jerusalem, Ottoman Empire
- Resting place: Mount of Olives Jewish Cemetery

Religious life
- Religion: Judaism
- Sect: Sephardic Judaism

Jewish leader
- Predecessor: Moshe Yosef Mordechai Meyuchas
- Successor: Yaakov Coral
- Position: Rishon LeZion

Rabbi Yaakov Moshe Ayash (Hebrew: יעקב משה עייאש; 1727 – January 14, 1817) was one of the Chief Sephardic Rabbis in the Land of Israel during the early 19th century.

== Early life ==
Ayash was born in Algiers in 1727 to Rabbi Yehuda Ayash, who served as Chief Rabbi for the city. In 1756, he immigrated to the Land of Israel with his father and several other emigrants from Algeria. In 1779, he went on a mission from Jerusalem to Morocco as a shliach and negotiated halakha with Moroccan sages.

== Emissary status and residence in Italy ==
From 1783 to 1784, he resided in Livorno, where he helped print several Jewish books, including his father's commentary Mate Yehuda on the Shulchan Aruch, and Shema Yaakov, which was a book of sermons on the Torah by Israel Yaakov Algazi. He lived in Italy for 22 years, and served as the rabbi for the community of Siena for 12 of them. He then served as the rabbi of Ferrara for the last 10. He made another special visit, to Mantua, in 1795.

He printed many books during his time in Italy, including many siddurim, as well as Derech Chaim, and Effri Zutri by Rabbi Yaakov Pardo, the son of David Pardo. He was very successful as a book publisher and received funding from many wealthy Livornese to help him in his business. In the books he helped published, he inserted many excerpts alluding to his wish to return to Ottoman Palestine. Among his students during this period were Graziadio Nepi and Yaakov Yisrael Carmi.

== 19th century and final years ==
Ayash returned to Jerusalem in 1803 and was helped by Florentine Rabbi Hezekiah Manoah Chaim Raphael to establish "Chaim v'Chesed", a Yeshiva. Two years later, he was appointed head of the Yeshivat Knesset Yisrael, which his father headed decades prior.

In 1806, he was elected to be the Rishon LeZion, which he served as until his death on January 14, 1817.

== Family ==
His son, Rabbi David Ayash, settled in the city of Nablus.
