= Yaakov Roja =

Lithuanian–Israeli Haredi Rabbi (born 1944)

Yaacov Roja
- יעקב רוז'ה
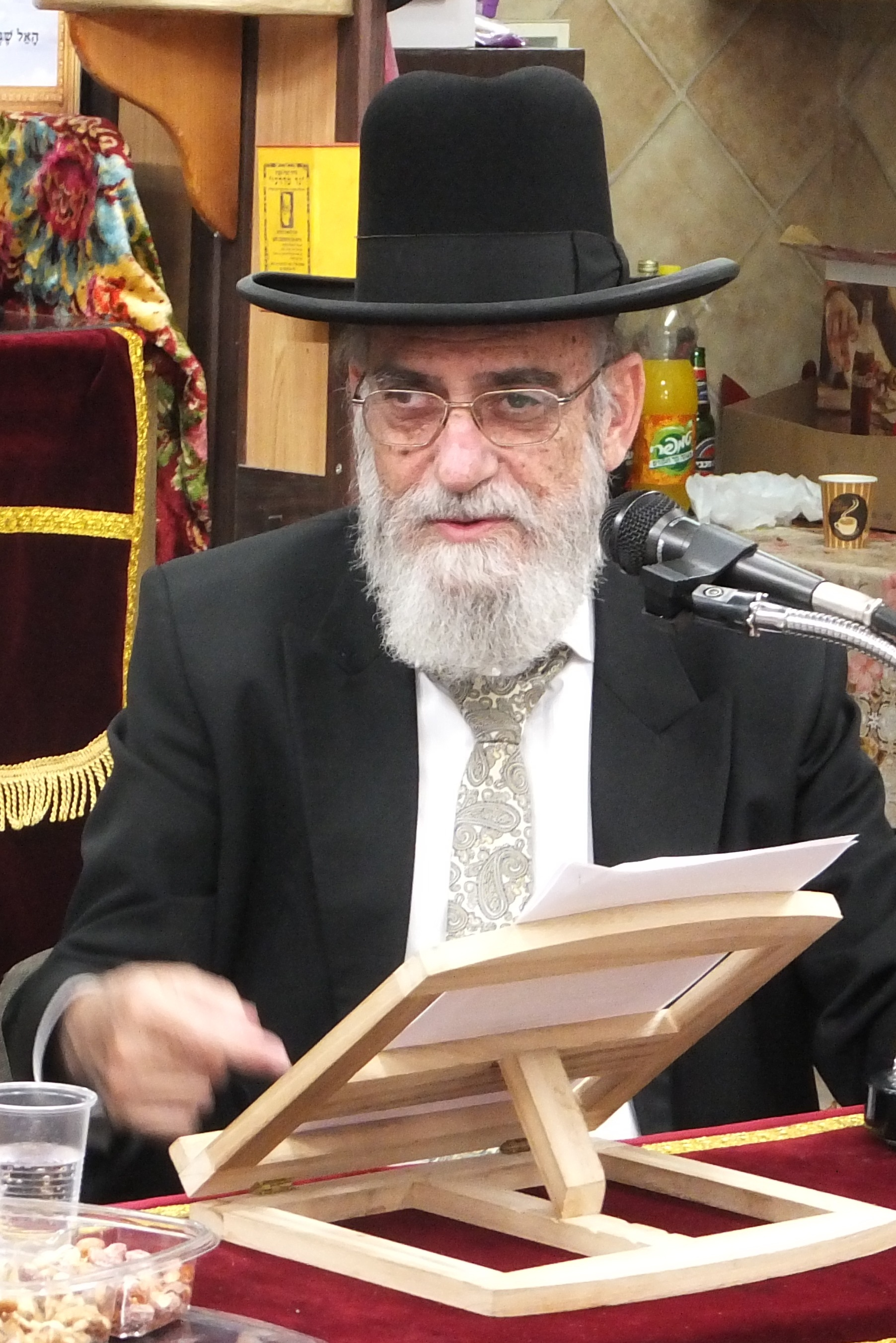
- Born: February 24, 1944 (age 81)
- Education: Hebron Yeshiva
- Employer: ZAKA
- Known for: Identifying remains of fallen soldiers

Yaakov Roja (Hebrew: יעקב רוז'ה; born February 24, 1944) is a Lithuanian–Israeli Haredi Rabbi, and member of the Chief Rabbinate council. On June 30, 2024, he became interim president of the Council of the Chief Rabbinate, alongside Rabbi Eliezer Igra who serves as interim president of the rabbinical court, after chief rabbis David Lau and Yitzhak Yosef ended their terms with no successor named. He also serves as the city rabbi of Bat Yam and is an expert on identifying battlefield remains.

== Biography ==
Roja was born in Tel Aviv and grew up in Bnei Brak. He studied in the Yishuv and Hebron Yeshiva.

He served in the engineering corps of the Israel Defense Forces. Soon after he completed his service, the Yom Kippur War broke out and he began the task of identifying bodies of those who fell in battle.

During the 2014 Gaza War, it was Roja who made the final halakhic decision that identified that soldiers Oron Shaul and Hadar Goldin were dead. He also identified the remains of Naftali Frankel, Eyal Yafarah and Gil-Ad Shaar.

He serves as the chairman of the Rabbinical Council of ZAKA and as the chief rabbinate's representative at the National Center of Forensic Medicine. He has the rank of lieutenant colonel in the army and serves as an advisor of the IDF to identify the remains of victims of war.

When the Gaza war began with the October 7 attacks in 2023, Roja was responsible for identifying all the civilian victims.

Roja was principal of Segulah School in Bnei Brak, but moved to Bat Yam to become head of the Aderet Yeshiva. In 2019, Roja was appointed Chief Ashkenazi Rabbi of Bat Yam.

On June 30, 2024, he became interim president of the Council of the Chief Rabbinate, temporarily replacing Rabbi Yitzhak Yosef until a new Rishon LeZion (Sefardi Chief Rabbi, who normally holds that role) is elected.

He is the author of Chesed Ve'Emet Nifgashu, a collection of responsa on the laws of mourning.
