= Raphael Moshe Bula =

Ottoman-era rabbi (died 1773)

Rabbi Raphael Moshe Bula
- רפאל משה בולה
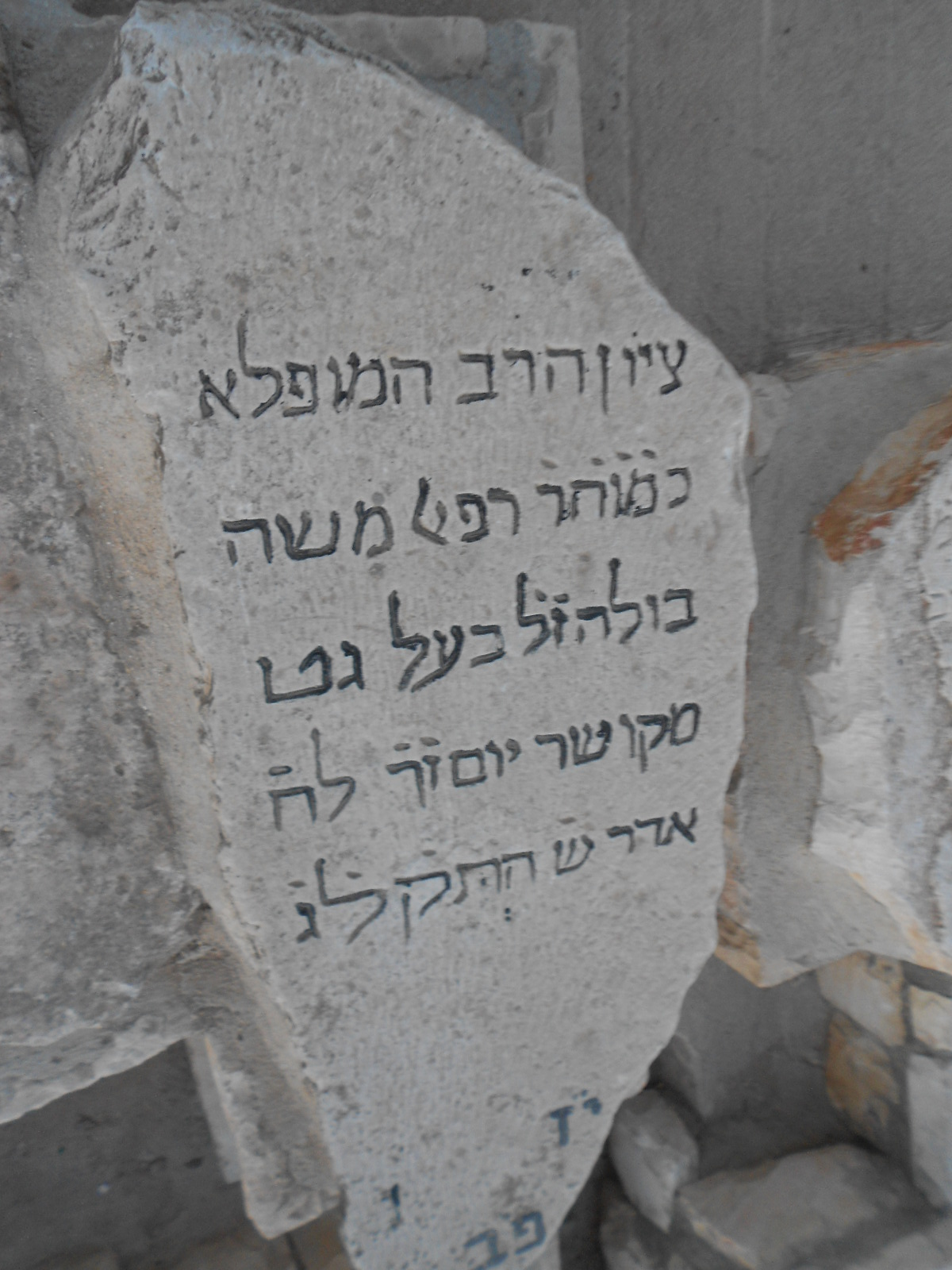
- Bula's gravestone

Personal life
- Born: Salonika, Ottoman Empire
- Died: March 22, 1773 Jerusalem, Ottoman Empire
- Resting place: Mount of Olives Jewish Cemetery
- Spouse: Zimbul Kimche (d. 1777)
- Relatives: Yom Tov Algazi (son-in-law)

Religious life
- Religion: Judaism
- Sect: Sephardic Judaism

Jewish leader
- Predecessor: Chaim Raphael Avraham ben Asher
- Successor: Yom Tov Algazi
- Position: Rishon LeZion

Rabbi Raphael Moshe Bula (Hebrew: רפאל משה בולה; died March 22, 1773) was an 18th-century rabbi in Jerusalem and briefly served as the Chief Sephardi Rabbi in the Land of Israel.

== Early life ==
Bula was likely born in Salonika to Rabbi Yosef Bula (died November 2, 1739). In his young adult years, he served as a rabbi in Ancona. He immigrated to the Land of Israel and settled in the city of Jerusalem. In 1752, he travelled to Anatolia, and stayed in Constantinople. He published his first book, a collection of sermons titled Chayei Olam. He later returned to Jerusalem and worked at the Neve Shalom Yeshiva. After the death of its previous Rosh Yeshiva, rabbi Yisrael Yaakov Algazi, in 1756, he was appointed its Rosh Yeshiva. He was mentioned as its president two years later.

== Career ==
In 1767, he published Get m'kashar, which spread his name across Europe and garnered respect for his level of Torah knowledge. The book dealt with gets, Jewish religious divorce documents, and was highly praised by the sages of his generation. It was, however, not accepted as a practical book of reference for legal proceedings due to the fact that his book did not break down each law's details, making it difficult to clearly enterpret as a legal code.

Rabbi Chaim Raphael Avraham ben Asher passed away on August 17, 1772, and Bula was appointed in his place as the Rishon LeZion. He only served for a short period of time, and it was more of an interim appointment. This is because Rabbi Raphael Meyuchas ben Shmuel wanted his son, Rabbi Moshe Yosef Mordechai Meyuchas, to be his own successor, but the appointment was delayed due to the popularity of Rabbi Yom Tov Algazi, who lived in Jerusalem and was considered a great Torah scholar. ben Asher was pointed to the position during this dispute, as was Bula. Bula was succeeded by Algazi, and controversy broke out over that appointment. The dispute was resolved following the death of Moshe Meyuchas's wife. He married Algazi's daughter in a second marriage and the two reconciled. He then succeeded Algazi as the Rishon LeZion.

== Personal life and death ==
During his period of rule, Bula fell ill during a famine in Jerusalem due to related diseases, and hundreds of residents of the city died from it. He died in Jerusalem on April 20, 1773, and was buried in the Mount of Olives Jewish Cemetery. On April 15, 1777, his wife, Zimbul, daughter of Rabbi Shmuel Kimche, died as well and was buried next to him.

His son was Rabbi Shlomo Bula, who wrote Lechem Shlomo, which was published in Salonika (where he lived) in 1795.

His son-in-law was Rabbi Yom Tov Algazi, who succeeded him as Rishon LeZion.
