= Samuel Garmison =

Samuel Garmison was a Jewish scholar and rabbi who lived in Ottoman Syria during the seventeenth century.

He was a native of Salonica, and settled in Jerusalem, where he became rabbi. Of his numerous works only two, and these in manuscript, are extant: Imre Binah, novellae on Talmudic treatises, and Imre No'am, homilies; the second part of the latter is in the possession of Hakham Bashi Al-Yashar in Jerusalem. In the latter work the author quotes three others: Imre Yosher, Imre Emet, and a commentary on Tur Choshen Mishpat.
