= Gedaliah Cordovero =

Safed-born Talmudic scholar (1562 - 1625)

- Born: 1562; Safed
- Died: 1625 (aged 62–63); Jerusalem
- Occupation: Talmudic scholar

Gedaliah Cordovero (1562–1625) was a medieval Jewish Talmudic scholar.

== Biography ==
He was born in Safed in 1562.

== See also ==
- Chief Rabbinate of Israel
