= Yitzhak Kovo =

Sephardi rabbi and hacham bashi (1770–1854)

Yitzhak Ben-Hezekiah Yosef Kovo
- יצחק קובו
- In office 1848–1854
- Title: Rishon LeZion

Personal life
- Born: 1770 Salonica, Ottoman Empire
- Died: 1854 (aged 83–84) Alexandria, Egypt
- Notable work(s): Mishnah, Talmud, Shulchan Aruch, responsa
- Occupation: Rabbi

Religious life
- Religion: Judaism

Senior posting
- Predecessor: Chaim Abraham Gagin
- Successor: Chaim Nissim Abulafia

Yitzhak Ben-Hezekiah Yosef Kovo (Hebrew: יצחק קובו; 1770–1854) was born in the large Sephardi community of Ottoman Salonica and later settled in Jerusalem. In 1848, he succeeded Chaim Abraham Gagin as hacham bashi aged 78. Throughout his career he went on fundraising missions to Poland, London and Egypt. In 1854, he died while in Alexandria. He authored many works on the Mishnah, Talmud and Shulchan Aruch and wrote responsa.

== Sources ==
- Tidhar, David (1947). "Yitzhak Kovo" הרב יצחק קובו. Encyclopedia of the Founders and Builders of Israel (in Hebrew). Vol. 14. Estate of David Tidhar and Touro College Libraries. p. 4544.
- Gaon, M.D. (1938) Yehudei ha-Mizrach be-Eretz Yisrael, Vol. 2, pg. 623–626.
