= Eliyahu Moshe Panigel =

Sephardi chief rabbi of the Ottoman Empire, Palestine, and Jerusalem (1850–1919)

Rabbi Eliyahu Moshe Panigel
- אליהו משה פאניז'יל
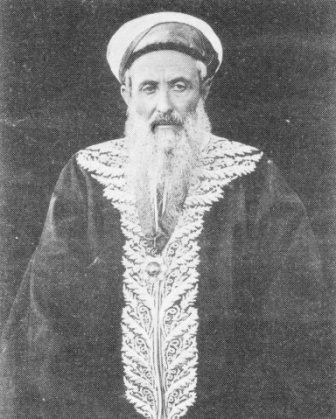
- Title: Hacham Bashi, Rishon LeTsiyyon

Personal life
- Born: 1850
- Died: 1919 (aged 68–69)
- Occupation: Chief Rabbi
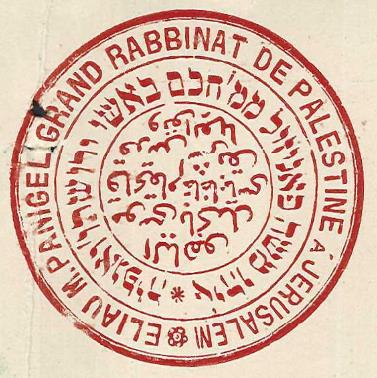
- Signature

Religious life
- Religion: Judaism

Senior posting
- Predecessor: Jacob Saul Elyashar

Eliyahu Moshe Panigel (Hebrew: אליהו משה פאניז'יל; 1850–1919) was the Sephardi chief rabbi of the Ottoman Empire, Zion and Jerusalem.

== Biography ==
Orphaned at a young age, Panigel was brought up by his uncle Raphael Meir Panigel, the Rishon le-Tsiyyon (the Head of Zion; Chief Rabbi). He was sent to Algeria to collect funds for the Misgav Ladach Hospital in Jerusalem and to North Africa, Italy, India, the Caucasus and Bukhara, by the Jerusalem community. After the death of Jacob Shaul Elyashar in 1906, a dispute arose within the community as to who should be appointed his successor. The more modern members supported Jacob Meir while the more traditional supported Chaim Moses Elyashar. Meir assumed the position for a few months before he was deposed by the Sultan of Turkey. In 1907 Panigel was chosen as Hakham Bashi and Rishon le-Tsiyyon but he was forced to resign 1908. Rabbi Nachman Batito subsequently served as Deputy Chief Rabbi from 1909 to 1911, whereupon Rabbi Moses Franco of Rhodes was appointed Chief Rabbi until 1915. When Jerusalem was captured by the British in 1917, Panigel publicly welcomed General Allenby and the Jewish Legion.

Jewish titles
Preceded by Jacob Meir	Rishon le-Zion; Elijah Moses Panigel; 1907	Succeeded by Moshe Yehuda Franco
