= Chaim Abraham Gagin =

Chief Rabbi of Ottoman Palestine in 1842–1848

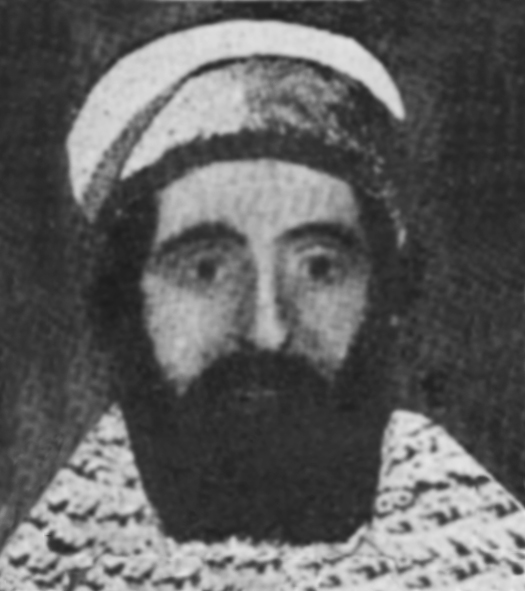
- image attributed to Chaim Abraham Gaguine

Personal life
- Born: 1787 Constantinople, Ottoman Empire
- Died: 23 May 1848 (aged 60–61) Jerusalem, Ottoman Empire

Religious life
- Religion: Judaism

Jewish leader
- Predecessor: Yehuda Navon
- Successor: Yitzhak Kovo
- Position: Chief Rabbi of Ottoman Palestine
- Began: 1842
- Ended: 1848

Chaim Abraham Gagin (1787–1848) was Chief Rabbi of Ottoman Palestine from 1842 to 1848. He was a foremost posek, mekubal, author, and the head of the Tiferet Yerushalaim Yeshiva. One of his notable actions was saving the Samaritans from extermination.

== Biography ==
Born in Constantinople, he was the grandson of the Jerusalem Kabbalist Shalom Sharabi. Gagin was the first individual to hold both the positions of Hakham Bashi and Rishon Lezion simultaneously following their merger. This appointment granted him formal recognition as the representative of the Jewish community to the government, endowing him with judicial, religious, and civic authorities.

Regarded as one of the foremost poskim (Jewish legal decisors) of his era, Gagin also oversaw the Tiferet Yerushalaim Yeshiva. Among his notable works is Sepher Hatakanoth Vehaskamoth, a compendium of Jewish religious rites and customs as practiced in the City of Jerusalem. He was also the author of Chukei Chaim, a work addressing the debate on halukka, and Sefer Chaim MiYerushalaim, a collection of derashot.

He supported the establishment of Rabbi Yisrael Bak's printing house in Jerusalem, where some of his books were printed.

During the 1840s, the Samaritans faced persecution from Muslims who regarded them as "idol worshippers", forcing them to convert to Islam or face execution. The Samaritans asked Gagin to help them, and he wrote a document that the Samaritans are a "a branch of the children of Israel, who acknowledge the truthfulness of the Torah." This proclamation led Muslim authorities to recognize the Samaritans as a Jewish sect, saving them from persecution and extermination.

Gagin was interred on the Mount of Olives.
