= Yaakov Coral =

Rishon LeZion

Rabbi Yaakov Coral
- יעקב קוראל

Personal life
- Born: Ottoman Empire
- Died: February 1, 1818 Jerusalem, Ottoman Empire
- Resting place: Mount of Olives Jewish Cemetery

Religious life
- Religion: Judaism
- Sect: Sephardic Judaism

Senior posting
- Predecessor: Yaakov Moshe Ayash
- Successor: Joseph ben Hayyim Hazan
- Position: Rishon LeZion

Yaakov Coral (Hebrew: יעקב קוראל; died February 1, 1818) was a Rishon LeZion in the Land of Israel in the early 19th century.

== Life ==
Koral's family originated in the city of Safed, where they immigrated during the period of influence of Rabbi Isaac Luria.

He was one of the most influential rabbis in Jerusalem of his generation, and he was its Av Beit Din in 1810. He was described contemporarily as "great in Torah and fear [of Hashem], of the race of attitude and virtue." He served under the Beit Din of Rabbi Yaakov Moshe Ayash, who was his predecessor in his most senior position. In 1817, he was appointed to the Rishon LeZion. Due to the timing of his death, he only served for a term of one year.

Had had written a book, The Singer of the Land, which was lost while still in manuscript form.

He died on February 1, 1818 in Jerusalem, and was buried in the Mount of Olives Jewish Cemetery.
