= Moshe Yehuda Franco =

Chief Sephardic rabbi (1837–1917)

- משה יהודה פרנקו
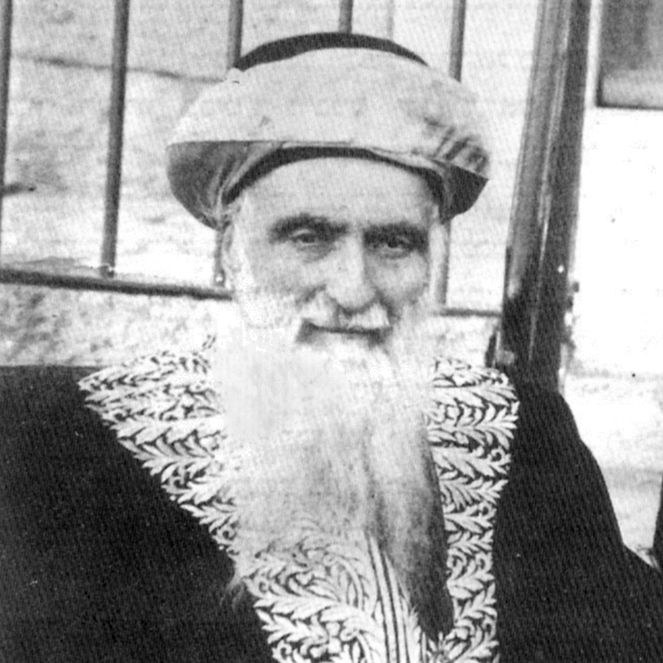

Personal life
- Born: 1837 Rhodes, Ottoman Empire
- Died: December 16, 1917 (aged 79–80) Jerusalem, Ottoman Empire
- Resting place: Mount of Olives Jewish Cemetery

Religious life
- Religion: Judaism
- Sect: Sephardic Judaism

Jewish leader
- Predecessor: Nachman Batito
- Successor: Haim Moshe Elyashar
- Position: Rishon LeZion

Rabbi Moshe Yehuda Franco (Hebrew: משה יהודה פרנקו; 1837 – December 16, 1917) was chief rabbi for the island of Rhodes and the 33rd Rishon LeZion of Israel.

== Early life ==
Franco was born in 1837 on Rhodes to Rabbi Yosef "Kodja" Franco, whom he studied Torah under as a child. His father was one of the sages of the region and involved in its various yeshivas. As a young adult, Franco worked as a peddler and wandered throuhout the villages on the island, eventually opening up a small shop.

== Adult years ==
In 1896, he was appointed chief rabbi of Rhodes, and was influential on the island, and was an official involved in community projects at the turn of the 20th century. This was on top of his position as the consul general of France for the island. He abdicated the position in 1911 due to old age, and immigrated to Jerusalem. That year, he was appointed Sephardi chief rabbi of the Land of Israel. He initially didn't want the position, but accepted to avoid mediate between multiple Sephardi factions. He also held the title of Hakham Bashi, the chief rabbi of the Ottoman Empire.

Henry Morgenthau Sr. visited with Franco during his tenure as Rishon LeZion and noted "His title is the biggest thing about him. He has a little bit of a building in a very much out of the way street and it is not at all impressive."

In February 1915, he authored a letter in the paper Hacheruth, voicing protest against the treatment of the Jewish community by the Ottoman government. He resigned from his post in October of that year.

== Final years and family ==
Franco died on December 16, 1917 and was buried at the Mount of Olives Jewish Cemetery.

He was the father of Hizkia Franco, who was married to Sol Alhadeff and oversaw the Jewish community of Smyrna. Franco was also the grandfather of Robert Franco, who worked at the Bank of Salonica in Smyrna and the Smyrna branch of Standard Oil. Robert was also a graduate of the American College at Smyrna and the secretary of the Sephardi community in New York, among involvement with many other philanthropic organizations.
