= Avraham Ashkenazi =

Sephardi Chief Rabbi of Ottoman Palestine

- אברהם אשכנזי
- Title: Hakam Bashi

Personal life
- Born: 1813 Janishar, near Salonica, Ottoman Empire
- Died: 22 January 1880 (aged 66–67) Jerusalem, Ottoman Empire
- Occupation: Chief Rabbi (Rishon LeZion)

Religious life
- Religion: Judaism

Senior posting
- Predecessor: Haim David Hazzan
- Awards: Order of the Medjidie, Franz Josef medal

Avraham Ashkenazi (Hebrew: אברהם אשכנזי; 1813–1880) was a Sephardi chief rabbi (Rishon LeZion).

Rabbi Ashkenazi was born at Janishar, near Salonica, in 1813. Aged fifteen, he was taken by his father to Jerusalem, where he studied rabbinical literature in the various colleges. The Turkish rabbis, in consulting him at the age of 35 on matters of religious law, addressed him as "Gaon." He authored several responsa and novellae.

In 1850, he was appointed dayyan (religious judge) of the Jewish community of Jerusalem with the support of both Sephardim and Ashkenazim. In 1857 he became the Av Beth Din (chief judge) and in 1869 the rabbis of Jerusalem elected him as their chief in succession to Haim David Hazzan, who died in that year. The sultan, in confirming Ashkenazi's election, conferred upon him the title of Hakam Bashi, whereby he became chief rabbi of Palestine, which post he held for about twelve years. The sultan also bestowed upon him the Order of the Medjidie; and Emperor Franz Josef of Austria, when at Jerusalem, decorated him with the Franz Josef medal.

The Tomb of Simeon the Just in Jerusalem was registered in his name. Ashkenazi was very popular among Christians and Muslims as well as among Jews; at his funeral most of the foreign consuls were present. He died at Jerusalem on January 22, 1880.
