= Yom-Tov Danon =

18th through 19th century rabbi and author

Yom-Tov Danon יום־טוב דאנון

Personal life
- Born: 1741 Smyrna
- Died: 1823 (aged 81–82) Jerusalem
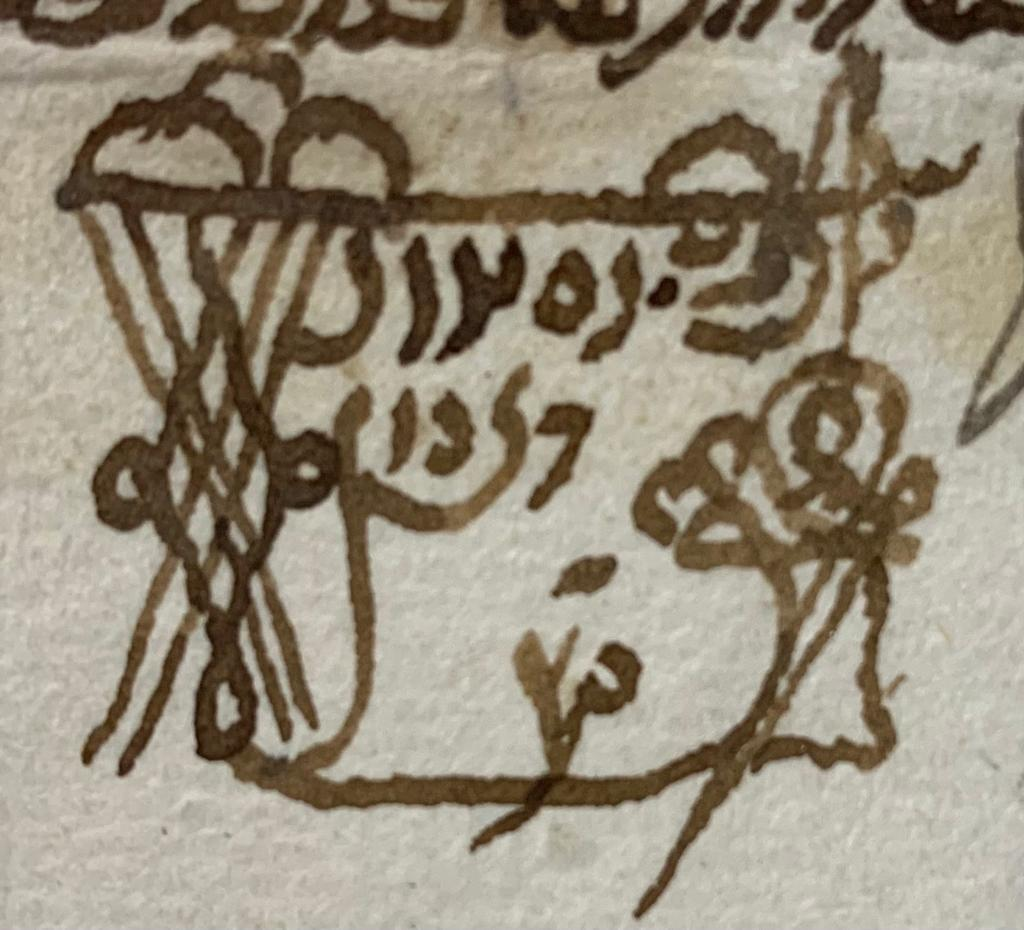
- Signature

Religious life
- Religion: Judaism

Jewish leader
- Predecessor: Joseph Hazan
- Successor: Shlomo Moshe Suzin
- Position: Rishon LeZion
- Began: 1821
- Ended: 1823

Yom-Tov Danon (Hebrew: יום־טוב דאנון; 1741–1823) rabbi and author. Born in Smyrna, He went to Jerusalem in 1821, where he succeeded Joseph Ḥazan as chief rabbi. He wrote Kevod Yom-Tov, a commentary on Maimonides' Yad ha-Ḥazaḳah (Salonica, 1846).
