= Yonah Moshe Navon =

Rishon LeZion (died 1841)

- יונה משה נבון
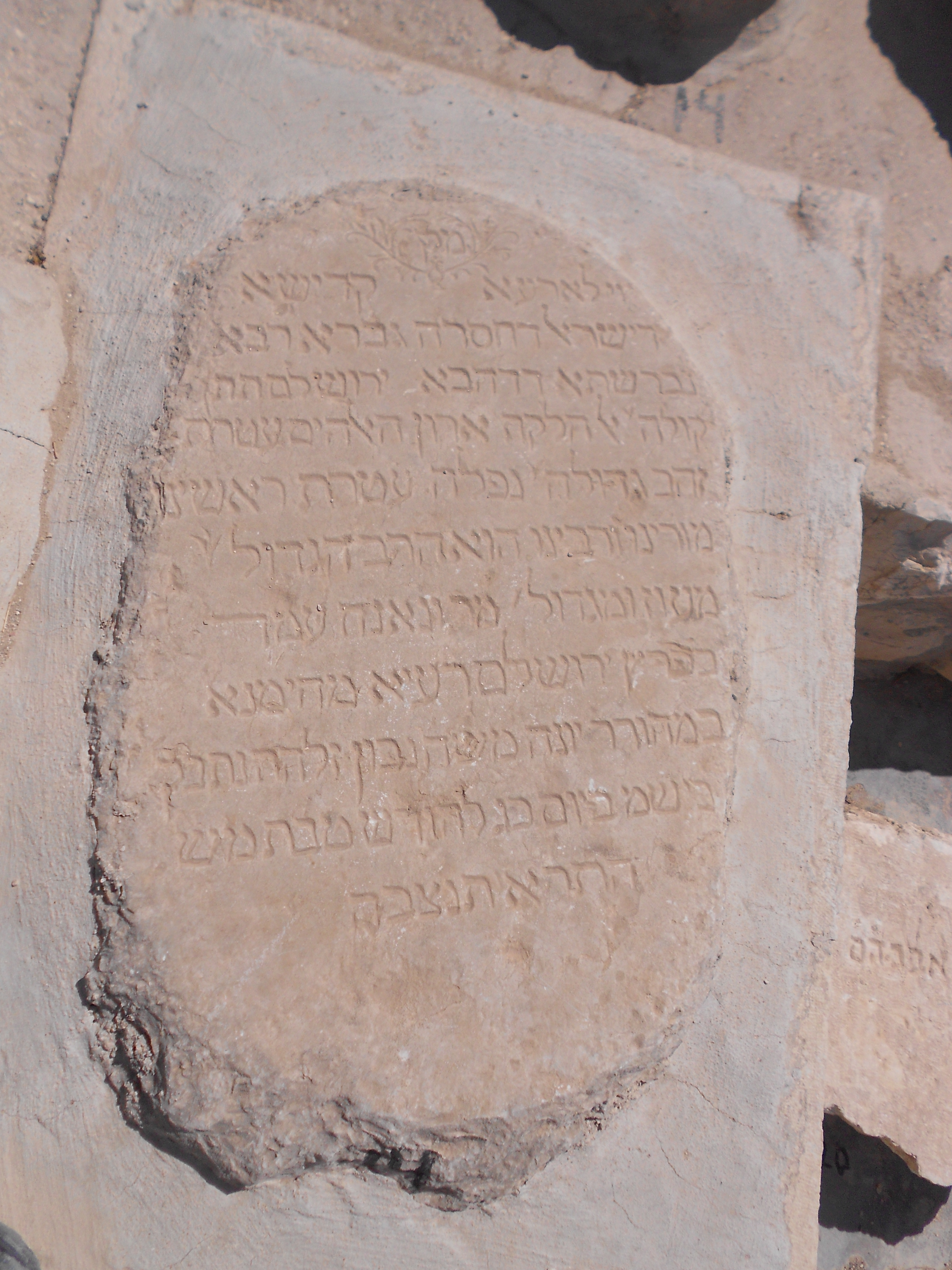
- Navon's gravestone

Personal life
- Died: January 16, 1841
- Resting place: Mount of Olives Jewish Cemetery

Religious life
- Religion: Judaism
- Sect: Sephardic Judaism

Jewish leader
- Predecessor: Shlomo Moshe Suzin
- Successor: Yehuda Navon

Rabbi Yonah Moshe Navon (nicknamed "Moreno"; Hebrew: יונה משה נבון; died January 16, 1841) was one of the Chief Sephardi Rabbis of the Land of Israel.

== Early life ==
Navon was born "at the end of the 18th century" in Jerusalem to Rabbi Binyamin Navon, author of the book "Twice as much" (Hebrew: פי שניים), who himself was the son of Rabbi Yonah Navon. The family was famous within the Jewish community of the city. He studied at the Yeshivat Beit Yaakov, where many sages in Jerusalem had studied prior. In 1799, following Napoleon's campaign in the region, poverty became widespread in the community. Navon was sent to cities in North Africa along with his cousin Rabbi Yonah Saadia Navon. One such city was Algiers, in which the Navons complained to Rabbi Yehouda Ayache about the mishandling of funds meant for families in Eretz Yisroel from Alexandria.

== Career and death ==
He became a member of the court of Rabbi Shlomo Moshe Suzin. In 1836, with Suzin's death, he was appointed in his place to be Rishon LeZion. Some sources say that this was, in fact, on 8 Tevet 5596, which would be December 29, 1835. During this time, he helped to refurbish the Hurva Synagogue and establish the Menachem Zion Synagogue. He held the position from 1836 until his own death. He died on January 16, 1841 in Jerusalem and was buried in the Mount of Olives Jewish Cemetery.
