= Yehuda Navon =

Chief Sephardi Rabbi of Israel

Rabbi Yehuda Navon
- יהודה נבון

Personal life
- Born: Jerusalem, Ottoman Empire
- Died: December 4, 1844 Jerusalem, Ottoman Empire
- Resting place: Mount of Olives Jewish Cemetery

Religious life
- Religion: Judaism
- Sect: Sephardi Judaism

Senior posting
- Predecessor: Yonah Moshe Navon
- Successor: Chaim Abraham Gagin
- Position: Rishon LeZion

Rabbi Yehuda Navon (Hebrew: יהודה נבון; died 1844) was Av Beit Din in Jerusalem and was a Rishon LeZion in the Land of Israel.

== Early life ==
Navon was born to Rabbi Chaim Raphael Navon, a member of a Sephardic Jewish family that immigrated to the Land of Israel at the beginning of the 18th century, when his great grandfather, Rabbi Ephraim Navon immigrated to Jerusalem. He was named for his grandfather, Rabbi Yehuda Navon, who was the author of Kiryat Melech Rav. The family originated in the city of Constantinople.

== Career ==
In 1797, he held the position of an emissary from Hebron to North Africa. In 1836, he went on a mission to Jerusalem, and did the same again in 1844. After the death of his relative, Rabbi Yonah Moshe Navon, in 1841, he was appointed Av Beit Din for the city, clerk of the local Kollel, and the Rishon LeZion. He held the position for less than a full year.

An argument broke out regarding his appointment between his supports, as well as the supporters of opposing Rabbi Chaim Abraham Gagin. The opposition was led by Rabbi Abraham Salomon Camondo. Navon was forced to resign and hand the position to Gagin, both for settling the tense dispute, as well as due to his old age. He also had a feud with Rabbi Yeshayahu Bordacki, as Navon was fairly liberal in his positions.

== Personal life and death ==
Navon was well-known among her peers for his concern for the public good; the same for his halakhic knowledge. Although he was a "seeker of peace", he had a similar personality to his father, and was controversial. He was the author of the book "The Flag of the Camp of Ephraim", in which he elucidates on questions asked about his grandfather's book, "The Camp of Ephraim," although his response was never formally published.

He died in Jerusalem on December 4, 1844. He is buried in the Sephardic section of the Mount of Olives Jewish Cemetery.

He was the grandfather of Yosef Navon and Moshe Ephraim Navon.
