= Moshe Yosef Mordechai Meyuchas =

Chief Rabbi of Israel

- משה יוסף מרדכי מיוחס
- Preceded by: Raphael Meyuchas
- Succeeded by: Yom Tov Algazi

Personal details
- Born: 1738 Jerusalem, Ottoman Palestine
- Died: 1805 (aged 66–67) Jerusalem, Ottoman Palestine
- Occupation: Chief Rabbi (Rishon l’Zion)
- Known for: Chief Rabbi of Israel (1802–1805)

Moshe Yosef Mordechai Meyuchas (Hebrew: משה יוסף מרדכי מיוחס; Moses Joseph Mordechai Meyuchas) (1738–1805) was Chief Rabbi of Israel (Rishon l’Zion) from 1802 to 1805.

Meyuchas was born in Jerusalem to the Meyuchas family. He is the author of Sha’ar ha-Mayim (Salonika, 1768) Berachot Mayim (Salonika, 1789,) and Mayin Shaal (Salonika, 1799)
