= Israel Yaakov Algazi =

Sephardi chief rabbi (1680–1757)

- ישראל יעקב אלגאזי
- Born: 1680
- Died: 1757 (aged 76–77)
- Occupation: Rabbi of Smyrna

Israel Yaakov Algazi (Hebrew: ישראל יעקב אלגאזי; 1680–1757) was a Jewish rabbi of Smyrna and Jerusalem, who served as Rishon LeZion for the last few years of his life.

== Biography ==
He was born to Rabbi Yom Tov Alghazi and grew up in Smyrna. He studied with Rabbi Hayyim ben Jacob Abulafia and Isaac HaKohen Rapoport.

In Smyrna, he initiated the printing of the Kabbalistic book Hemdat Yamim (of unknown authorship, but which some attribute to Alghazi himself).

In the year 5495 (1734–1735), Algazi moved to Ottoman Palestine. He studied in the Beit El kabbalistic yeshiva. He was a member of the beit din of Eliezer Nachum. He served as the head of "Yeshivat Neve Shalom Brit Avraham" in which the greatest Jewish scholars of Jerusalem learned.

The Rishon LeZion Nisim Haim Moshe Mizrahi died in 1749. In 1749 or 1755 Alghazi was appointed Rishon LeZion in his place.

Alghazi died on 10 Tammuz 1757, and was buried in the "Kehal Hasidim" section of the Mount of Olives Jewish cemetery, near the grave of R' Shalom Sharabi.

His son, R' Yom Tov Algazi, was also appointed Rishon LeZion.
