= Haim Moshe Elyashar =

19th-century Sephardic rabbi

Rabbi Haim Moshe Elyashar

Personal life
- Born: January 11, 1845 Jerusalem, Ottoman Empire
- Died: January 10, 1924 (aged 78) Jerusalem, British Empire
- Home town: Mekor Baruch
- Spouse: Batya Panigel
- Children: 9
- Parent: Yaakov Shaul Elyashar (father)
- Relatives: Raphael Meir Panigel (father-in-law)

Religious life
- Religion: Judaism
- Sect: Sephardic Judaism

Senior posting
- Predecessor: Moshe Yehuda Franco
- Successor: Nissim Yehuda Danon
- Position: Rishon LeZion

Rabbi Haim Moshe Elyashar (Hebrew: חיים משה אלישר, nicknamed "the Chama" Hebrew: חמ"א, lit. 'his initials'; January 11, 1845 – January 10, 1924) was a Sephardi chief rabbi in the Land of Israel and the first of the British colonial period.

== Early life ==
Eliashar was born in 1845 in Jerusalem to Yaakov Shaul Elyashar, who himself would hold the same title as his son. He was educated at a local Talmud Torah and excelled in school. He later learned directly from his father, as well as from Rabbi Yousef Bourla, who was Av Beit Din for the city. When he was 14 years old, he married Batya, the daughter of then then-chief rabbi Raphael Meir Panigel. Following his marriage, he became a merchant for income while continuing his rabbinic studies. He was well-known for his understanding of the torah and in his modesty. People from all over sent in halakha questions. He spoke many languages, including Arabic and Turkish.

== Career ==
When his father became Rishon LeZion in 1893, Elyashar was appointed as his representative and his successor in the local district council, where he served for 13 years. He provided food for the soldiers in the Ottoman Empire and was a founding member of many public institutions in the city, including Shaare Zedek Medical Center and Misgav Ladach, all as a volunteer. After his father's death in 1905, a dispute broke out between his supports and the supports of Yaakov Meir. The well-established Sephardi community supported the Elyashar family and yearned to maintain the status quo, while Meir's supporters were more liberal. Meir was appointed, but later resigned, and the position went to 4 rabbis before him; he served from 1914 until 1915.

In 1918, the Rabbinic Council for Jerusalem was established to unite Ashkenazi and Sephardic rabbis under one organization. Rabbi Yitzchak Yerucham Diskin, along with Elyashar, were two such members. The committee did not last long and was replaced with the Rabbinic Office of the Jewish Community in Jerusalem, to which Elyashar served as president. This office was the basis for the later Chief Rabbinate of Israel.

== Last years ==
Elyashar lived in the Mekor Baruch neighborhood. He died in 1924, 1 day before his 79th birthday, and was buried in the Mount of Olives Jewish Cemetery in his family plot. He was survived by six sons and three daughters, among whom are Yosef Shaul Elyashar,Yitzchak Shemaya Elyashar, and Simha Meyuhas.
