= Nissim Yehuda Danon =

Chief Sephardi Rabbi of Israel (1874–1930)

Rav Nissim Yehuda Danon
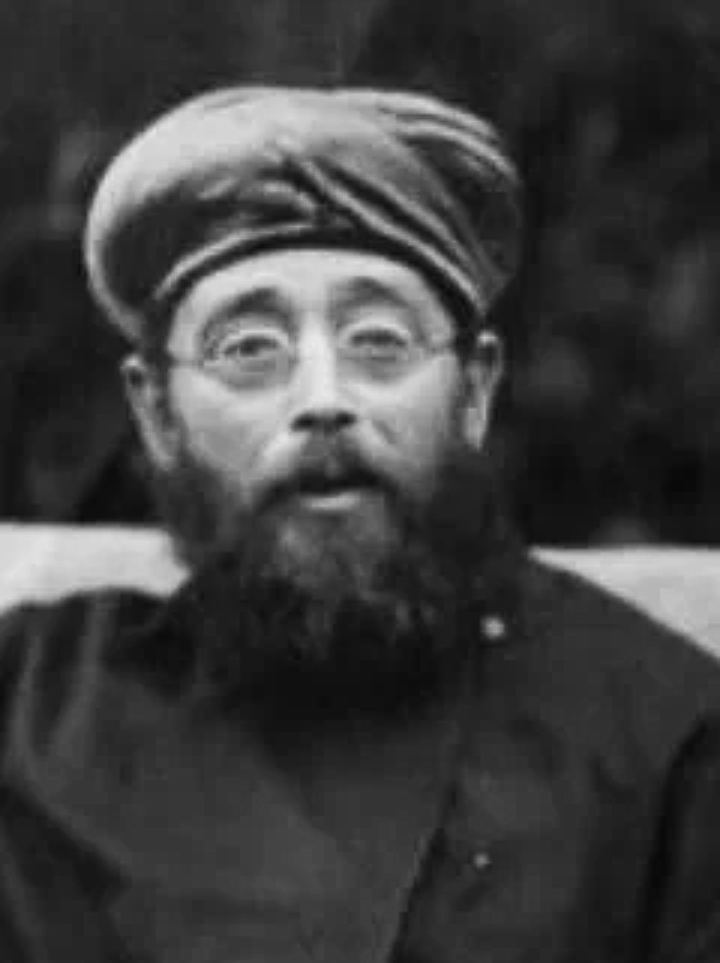

Personal life
- Born: 1874 Jerusalem, Ottoman Empire
- Died: 13 February, 1930 (aged 55-56) Sfax, French Protectorate of Tunisia
- Spouse: Zehava Saporta
- Children: at least 2

Religious life
- Religion: Judaism
- Sect: Sephardi

Jewish leader
- Predecessor: Haim Moshe Eliashar
- Successor: Yaakov Meir
- Position: Chief Sephardi Rabbi of Israel

Rabbi Nissim Yehuda Danon (Hebrew: נסים יהודה דנון; 1874 – February 13, 1930) was a Chief Sephardi Rabbi in Eretz Yisroel and the last Hakham Bashi of Ottoman Palestine.

== Early life ==
Danon was born in Jerusalem to a Jewish family and was the son of Rabbi Menachem Danon and his wife Esther. He went to school at Tiferet Jerusalem Yeshiva, and received his rabbinic ordination at 19. Following his graduation, he went to Paris and studied at the Israelite Seminary of France. Due to financial issues, he returned to his home and married Zehava, daughter of Yaakov Saporta.

== Career ==
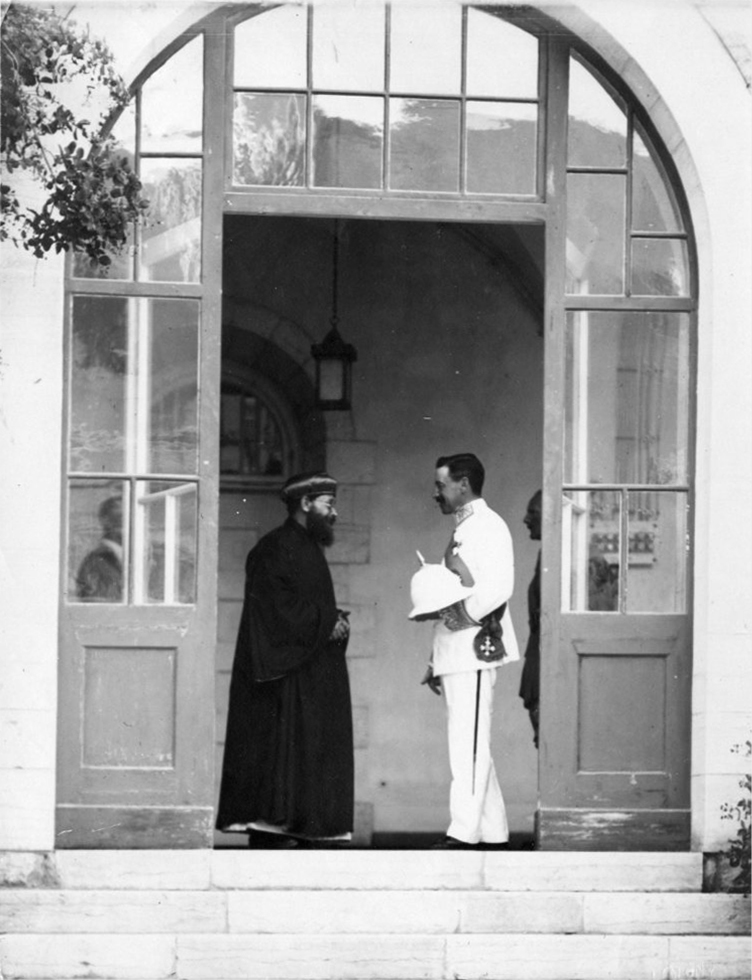
Herbert Samuel, 1st Viscount Samuel welcomes Danon to the Governor's House, 1920

In 1907, he was appointed chief rabbi in Beirut, serving in the position until 1910. That winter, he was invited to mediate disputes between Ashkenazim and Sephardim in Safed. Following his visit, 115 Ottoman citizens attended a meeting in which it was decided that he would be appointed Hacham Bashi in the city, which he declined. He was later dismissed from his Beirut position and appointed the Chief Rabbi in Rhodes. He played a short political role in his time there, but was deported back to the Ottoman Empire after the occupation of the island by the Italian army.

Later that year, Danon was elected by the General Assembly as Chief Rabbi of Smyrna. He served in that position until 1915. The next year, he was officially appointed Ottoman Hakham Bashi and Rishon LeZion.

== Final years ==
Danon sat in the Rabbinate until the end of 1918. When the British army occupied the region, he voluntarily resigned from the position and did not participate in following elections. Despite this, he met with Winston Churchill during his visit to the land in 1921. He travelled abroad and worked to collect charity as a meshulach. During this period, he was given 1000 Ottoman pounds by the Djemal Pasha as part of a relief committee for providing for the needy in Jerusalem. He died in Sfax during the French period in 1930. He left behind a manuscript containing a responsa and commentary on Rabbi Isaac Alfasi. Concurrently, he had been writing a book about contemporary history and his life.

=== Children ===
- His daughter was Eva Danon, who married a man named Nathan.
- His son, Yaakov Nissim, was born in 1912 and received a degree in economics from the University of Manchester. He married Bella Weissfish and was both a lieutenant during the 1948 Palestine war and an early financial bureaucrat for the State of Israel.
