= Yosef Haim HaCohen =

Maghrebi rabbi (b. 1851, d. 1921)

Rabbi Yosef Haim HaCohen יוסף חיים הכהן
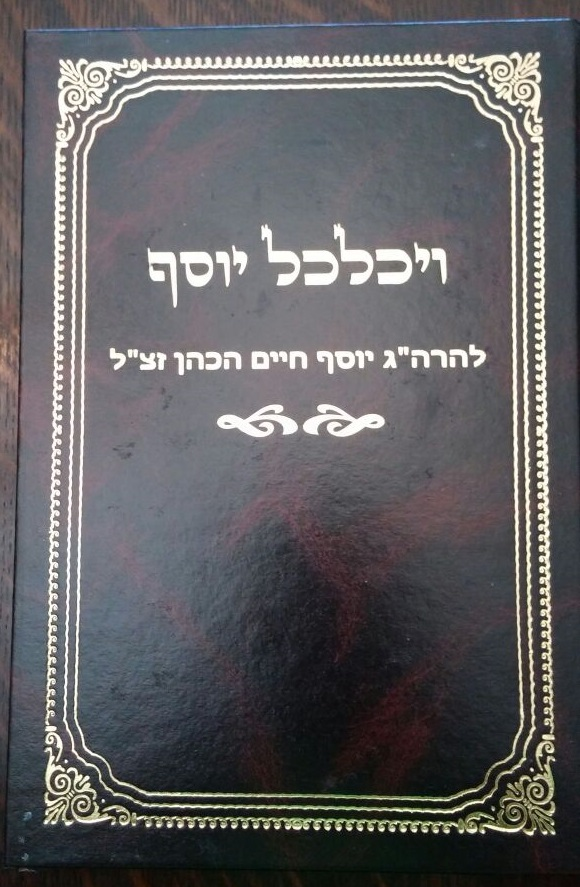
- VaYechalkhel Yosef by HaCohen (2008)
- Title: President of the Ma'araviim Community in Jerusalem

Personal life
- Born: Yosef Haim HaCohen; 1851 Mogador, Morocco
- Died: September 25, 1921 (aged 69–70) Jerusalem, Mandatory Palestine
- Buried: Mount of Olives Jewish Cemetery in East Jerusalem
- Spouse: Priha, Frida Shrem
- Children: 2 sons 2 daughters
- Parent(s): Rabbi Yehudah HaCohen; Simha
- Dynasty: HaCohen
- Occupation: Rabbi Judge and teacher

Religious life
- Religion: Judaism

Jewish leader
- Dynasty: HaCohen

Rabbi Yosef Haim HaCohen (Hebrew: הרב יוסף חיים הכהן; 1851 Mogador, Morocco – September 25, 1921 Jerusalem, Mandatory Palestine) was the President of the Ma’araviim Community in Jerusalem, as well as the rabbi, dayan (rabbinical judge), shadar (fund raiser and emissary) and rabad (Chief Rabbinical Judge) of the congregation.

== Biography ==
HaCohen was born in Mogador, Morocco in 1851 to Yehudah and Simha. In 1864, when he was thirteen, HaCohen and his family moved to Ottoman Palestine and settled in the Old City of Jerusalem where he enrolled in the Maghrebi Jewish school for religious studies. At the age of nineteen HaCohen married Priha, a fellow Moroccan Jew; they had no children. In 1897 HaCohen took a second wife named Frida, née Shrem, from Aleppo, Syria, with whom he had four children.

HaCohen was head of Yeshivat Touvy Yisbau in Jerusalem. He was a follower of the Mekubalim (Kabbalists) at ‘Beit–El’ yeshiva and synagogue and taught at Porat Yosef Yeshiva in Jerusalem. Later he was involved in founding and heading Oz L’Tora Yeshiva.

On 21 May 1900, HaCohen was elected Chairman of the Ma’araviim Community in Jerusalem, in addition to being deputy to the Chief Rabbi of the Sephardic Jews in Palestine, Nahman Batito. In 1915 after Batito's death, HaCohen replaced him as President of the Moroccan Jewish community in Jerusalem. In 1919, HaCohen got hundreds of people to sign a petition requesting the Delegates Committee of the Zionist Organization to support Misgav Ladach Hospital in the Old City of Jerusalem which suffered from sub-standard health conditions in the aftermath of World War I.

HaCohen worked as a religious emissary. In 1894 he went to Jewish communities in Saudi Arabia, Uzbekistan, and the Caucasus Mountains. In 1899 HaCohen went to Bukhara, where he raised funds for the Jerusalem congregation and also arranged for Torah Scrolls to be delivered to those remote communities. He worked with local scholars and philanthropists to publish books.

The Chief Rabbi of Bukhara, Hizkiya HaCohen Rabin, wrote in a letter of him to a colleague:

"In the year 1899, the shadar arrived to Bukhara from the holy city of Jerusalem. Upon his arrival he informed the Bukharic Jewry of the sad news of Rabbi Nissim Baruch ZT”L, the rabad, Head Chief Judge from Jerusalem; and of Rabbi Eliyahu Mani ZT”L the chasid from Hebron" both died.

During his lengthy stay in Bukhara he learned the native language of the Bukharian Jews. HaCohen's final mission, in 1903, was to Algiers, and to Constantine, Algeria. In the preface of the second volume of his book Minhat Cohen (1910) HaCohen referred to his activity there while writing a responsum which he dated: “while I was residing during Mitzvah mission. Kasantina month Adar year 5663…”

Yosef Haim HaCohen died of a brief pulmonary infection on 22 Elul 5681 (25 September 1921). A large crowd attended his funeral at the Arialis lot, the Sephardic-Hasidic area on the Mount of Olives in Jerusalem.

== Publications ==
Some of his writings, such as "Kohi V’Reshit Oni," on masachtot, "Darcheyi Haim", sermons and chiddushim (novel views) on the Torah, are lost.

Minhat Cohen was the only book published during HaCohen's lifetime. The book contains various Halachic judgements and discussions on Talmudic law.

HaCohen gave a manuscript of his work Va’Yechalkhel Yosef to his son-in-law, Rabbi Amram Aburbeh who edited it and published it in 1966 as a kuntris (booklet) within his own book Netivey-Am. Va’Yechalkhel Yosef. It contains responsa by HaCohen and by Rabbis Solomon Eliezer Alfandari and Yosef Chaim Sonnenfeld. In 2008, a new edition of Va’Yechalkhel Yosef was published by HaCohen's grandson Ehud Avivi.

His views on halakha (Jewish law) were published in the HaMe’asef journal edited by Rabbi Ben Zion Avraham Cuenca, Head Judge in Jerusalem.

== His students ==
Among his students were:

- Rabbi Amram Aburbeh (1894-1966), Talmud teacher in Porat Yosef Yeshiva and Sharey Zion Yeshiva in Jerusalem, Rabbi of the Nachlaot neighborhood in Jerusalem, founder of the Yeshiva and Or Zaruaa Synagogue, chief Rabbi of the Sephardic Community in Petah-Tikvah and a member of the Chief Rabbinate of Israel and author of Netivey Am
- Rabbi Yosef Yitzchak Shloush (1888-1960), Rabad (Head Rabbinical Judge) of the Ma’araviim in Jerusalem

== Sources ==
- "The settlement of the Maaraviim Jews in Jerusalem". Noar.education.gov.il. 1989.
- Elmalliah, Avraham, "Hod Yosef", Torat Emet Moroccan Jews Heritage
- HaCohen Yosef Haim. Minhat Cohen. 1st vol. Jerusalem: Y.N. Levi & Co., 1902.
- HaCohen Yosef Haim. Minhat Cohen. 2nd vol. Jerusalem: Dfus Azriel, 1910.
- Kol Israel Agudat Israel Youth newspaper, volume 1, second year (1921): (90-91) .
- Aburbeh, Amram (2003), Netivey Am Sermons
- Avivi, Tzameret-Rivka. “Minhat Cohen from Mogador to Jerusalem - Rabbi Yosef Haim HaCohen author of ‘Minhat Cohen’ and ‘V’Yechalchel Yosef’.” Brit the Moroccan Jews magazine, editor Asher Knafo, volume 28. 2009: 62–67.
- Ben Naim, Yosef (1931), Malchey Rabanan List of Moroccan Rabbis from the 15th century until the 20th century
- Dayan, Shlomo (1992), The Maarav Scholars in Jerusalem
- Galis, Yakov. Encyclopedia for the History of Erez Israel Scholars. Jerusalem: HaRav Kook Institute, 1977 ed. Print. Rabbi Yosef Haim Hacohen tombstone text is cited by Galis pp. 82–83.
- Gaon, Moshe-David (1938), The Eastern Jews in Eretz Israel
- HaCohen-Rabin, Yehudah (1989), Zarach Kochav Me-Yaakov: History and priesthood of Bukhara Rabbis
- רבין, אברהם (1988). "Eretz Israel Emissaries in Bukhara 1881-1913". Pe'amim: Studies in Oriental Jewry (35): 139–155. JSTOR 23427476.
- Jerusalem Municipal Archive, Vaad Ha-Eda Ha-Sepharadit archive. Sephardic Committee archive in the Jerusalem Municipal archive the courtesy of Efraim Levi.
- Yosef, Ovadia (2004), Orach Chaim Vol. 5 of Yabia Omer. section 14 page 92
- Sir Moses Montefiore Censuses (MMC): 1866 Widows Census of the Ma’arvim community in Jerusalem and 1866 Census of Teachers and Student the Ma’arvim community. http://www.montefiorecensuses.org

The link is found when entering the ID number as follows for Census year 1866, ID 1447, Scan Line 24, City Jerusalem, Kolel North African, the result is Yosef Cohen son of Simha and Yehudah Cohen. Name Yosef Cohen, Age 10, Status Orphan, Male, Father's Name Yehuda, Mother's Name Simha . Name Simha Cohen, Age 25, Status Widow, Female Spouse's Name Yehuda, Place of Birth Morocco, Year of Arrival 1864, Occupation Unemployed, Economic Status Poor.

- The Religious Zionism archive - HaRav Kook Institute, Jerusalem.
- The Old Court Museum, the Jewish quarter in Jerusalem. http://eng.shimur.org/Kaplan-Yishuv-Court/
- Rabbi Yosef Haim HaCohen family tree https://www.geni.com/people/Rabbi-Yosef-Haim-haCohen/6000000002529512703
- Rabbi Yosef Haim HaCohen, founder of Yeshiva Oz L'Torah petition to support published in HaAretz newspaper, (8 September 1921 ): (page 4) "Bakasha Letmicha". HaAretz: 4. September 1921.
- Netivei Am website
