= Nachman Batito =

Chief Sephardi Rabbi of the Land of Israel

- נחמן בטיטו
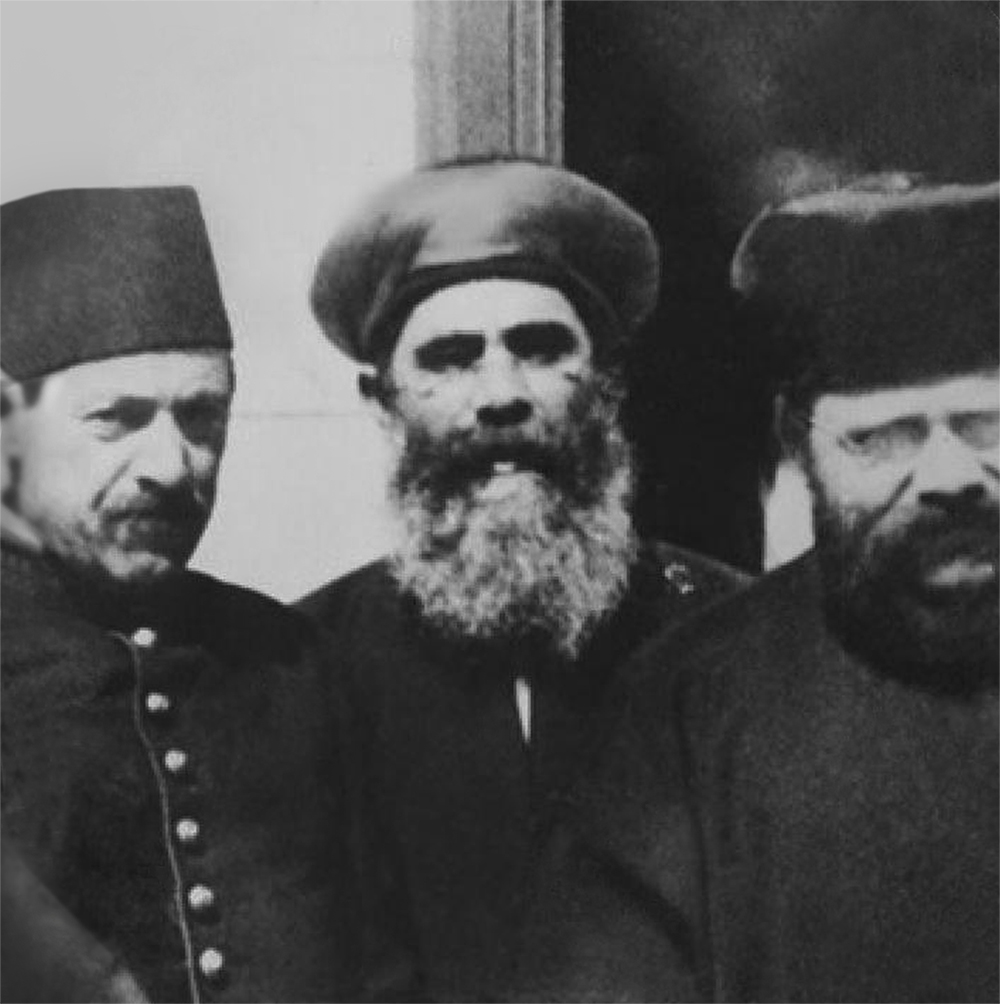

Personal life
- Born: 1845 Marrakesh, Morocco
- Died: August 25, 1915 (aged 69-70) Jerusalem, Ottoman Empire
- Resting place: Mount of Olives Jewish Cemetery
- Spouse: Yocheved Vita Rousseau

Religious life
- Religion: Judaism
- Sect: Sephardic Judaism

Jewish leader
- Predecessor: Eliyahu Moshe Panigel
- Successor: Moshe Yehuda Franco
- Position: Rishon LeZion

Rabbi Nachman Batito (1845 – August 25, 1915) was a Hakham Bashi and Rishon LeZion in the Land of Israel during Ottoman rule.

== Early life ==
Batito was born in 1845 in Marrakesh, and immigrated to the Land of Israel as a teenager with his family. They settled in Jerusalem, where he studied at the city's Sephardic Talmud Torah. and subsequently attended Tiferet Jerusalem Yeshiva. He was a member of the North African kollel. When he was 22, he married Zindel, but later remarried to Yocheved Vida Rousseau, having four children.

== Career ==
Upon the death of his mentor, Rabbi David ben Shimon, Batito was elected to serve as a leader of the Western Community Committee. Following the death of Rabbi Raphael Eliezar Ben-Tovo in 1886 (which he lamented in a eulogy), he was promoted alongside Rabbi Moshe Malka. He was chosen as the leader of the Western Community Committee after the death of the incumbent Issachar Atzaraf in 1892, as was Malka. 7 years later, a dispute broke out in the community between which one should lead. Rabbi Yaakov Shaul Elyashar resolved the dispute, and chose Malka as its official head. Batito assumed the role following Malka's death in 1900.

The Great Rabbinical Dispute, during which the position of Rishon LeZion was given to several men within a few years of each other, he was appointed in 1909 to the role following the dismissal of Rabbi Eliyahu Moshe Panigel, serving until 1911. He was a locum tenens on behalf of Rabbi Chaim Nahum, who had returned to Aleppo after the upheaval involving the dismissal of Panigel (headed by those dubbed "Anti-Pangelistos"). He was also a member of the Av Beit Din in the city and worked to reestablish the Western Talmud Torah.

== Final years ==
During WWI, the situation for residents in Jerusalem deteriorated and took a toll on Batito's health. He died on August 25, 1915. His tombstone reads, "Zion, in galut, will weep, and Jerusalem wil give her voice with a double-blowing of the shofar. Abiding by the mitzvoth from the Torah, a righteous and humble man, oppressed in torment, stands in the breach of Jerusalem. The head of the rabbis of the Bnei Marva and Rishon LeZion: the famed Rabbi Nachman Batito of righteous memory."

=== Family ===
- His daughter Miriam married Rabbi Nissim Ohana, who was sent by Jacob Saul Elyashar in 1905 to serve the Jewish community of Gaza.
- His daughter Gentel married Rabbi Abraham ben Yair, who was a wealthy merchant living in Khan Yunis. Following Abraham's daughter, Gentel and her son managed the business.
  - Their grandson Haim Ben Yair was a merchant who was a land redeemer for the early State of Israel.
- His daughter Rachel married Rabbi Nissim Rabin, a Cohain. She died during WWI.
- His daughter, Miriam-Merkadah, who was born a Rousseau but adopted by Batito. She married Moses Shimon Maaden.
