= Amram Aburbeh =

Israeli-Moroccan rabbi

Rabbi Amram Aburbeh עמרם אבורביע
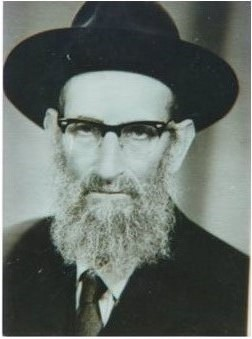
- Title: Chief Rabbi of the Sephardic congregation in Petah Tikva, Israel

Personal life
- Born: Amram Aburbeh; March 16, 1892 Tétouan, Morocco
- Died: December 20, 1966 (aged 72) Petah Tikva, Israel
- Buried: Segula cemetery Petah Tikva, Israel
- Spouse: Rivka Hacohen
- Children: 5 sons 1 daughter
- Parent(s): Rabbi Shlomo Aburbeh; Yocheved Khalfon
- Dynasty: Aburbeh
- Education: Porat Yosef Yeshiva
- Occupation: Rabbi Judge and teacher

Religious life
- Religion: Judaism
- Dynasty: Aburbeh
- Semikhah: Rabbi Yosef Haim HaCohen

Amram Aburbeh (Hebrew: עמרם אבורביע; March 16, 1892– December 12, 1966), also spelled Abourabia and Aburabia, was the Chief Rabbi of the Sephardic congregation in Petah Tikva, Israel and author of Netivei Am, a collection of responsa, sermons, and Torah teachings.

== Biography ==
Amram Aburbeh was born on March 16, 1892 (17 Adar 5652) in Tétouan, Morocco. During his youth, he studied in Midrash Shlomo, a beit midrash (study hall) run by his father, Rabbi Shlomo Aburbeh. His mother was Yocheved Khalfon.

In 1906 Aburbeh immigrated to Palestine with his paternal grandparents, Rabbi Yosef and Billiada Aburbeh. The rest of the family followed them 7 years later, settling in the Jewish Quarter of the Old City of Jerusalem. Here Aburbeh's father held a yeshiva in his home called Or Zaruaa. Aburbeh studied in the Touvy Yisba'u yeshiva of the Ma'araviim congregation until 1910. He later studied in the Porat Yosef Yeshiva. He received rabbinical ordination from his teacher, Rabbi Yosef Haim HaCohen, president and Rabad (chief judge) Rosh Av Beit Din of the Ma'araviim congregation in Jerusalem, when he was 29 years old. Aburbeh also became a certified shochet (ritual slaughter) and bodek. He married his teacher's daughter, Rivka, in 1919; the couple had five sons and one daughter. Aburbeh co-owned abookstore with his colleague Rabbi Yosef Yitzchak Shloush, head of the Ma'araviim congregation in Jerusalem. The bookstore sold Hebrew religious books and Judaica of which it also exported to North African Jewry and other communities in the Diaspora, such as Beirut, Lebanon. The store operated first in the Old City in Jerusalem (its catalogue indicates it was established in 1896) and later was relocated to the Mahane Yehuda neighborhood. Among the prayer books published in Jerusalem by Amram Aburbeh in 1933 is Siddur Shalom Yerushalem סדור שלום ירושלם כמנהג ק"ק ספרדים יוצאי המערב והמזרח . In 1941 Siddur V'Ani Tefilah סידור ואני תפלה כולל תפלות כל היום כמנהג ק"ק ספרדים was published; and in 1942 siddur "Seder Tefilah: According to tradition of Sefaradim holy community, including daily Tefilot for year round" סדר תפלה [Seder Tfilah]. סדר תפלה: ק"ק ספרדים, כולל תפלות לכל ימות השנה . In addition he sold Psalms books such as ספר תהלים מרום ציון [Sefer Tehilim Marom Zion]. ספר תהלים מרום ציון עם באור המלות עם מקור הדמעה וחנוכת הבית . Rabbi Amram Aburbeh's bookstore also sold books in the Ladino language: such as the siddur סדר מנחה וערבית של חול ושבת [Seder Mincha and Arvit of weekdays and Shabbat]. junto mincha de shabbat con el brich גונטו לה מנחה די שבת קון איל בריך and ספר שבחי האר״י [Sefer Shivchei HaAri] (in Ladino). 1911. (see citation links in Further Reading section).

Rabbi Amram Aburbeh received a license by the Government of Eretz Israel in 1942 to ship Etrogs abroad to the Jewish communities. This was published in the Official Gazette of the Government, issue no. 1204, page 617.

In addition to his occupation at the shop, Aburbeh taught at Porat Yosef Yeshiva and at Yeshivat Shaarey Zion, established by Chief Rabbi Ben-Zion Meir Hai Uziel. Uziel appointed Aburbeh as Chief Rabbi of the Nachlaot neighborhood in Jerusalem, where he served from 1925-1951. During the same time, Aburbeh was a dayan (religious court judge) for the Ma'araviim rabbinical court in Jerusalem, headed by Rabbi Ben-Zion Avraham Cuenca. In 1934 Aburbeh was appointed as shadar (funds emissary) on behalf of the Ma'araviim institutions in Jerusalem. He was dispatched to Morocco, where he successfully collected funds for a year. His return to Eretz Israel on September 6, 1934 was documented by the Jewish Agency administration as a registered passenger on the ship Roma

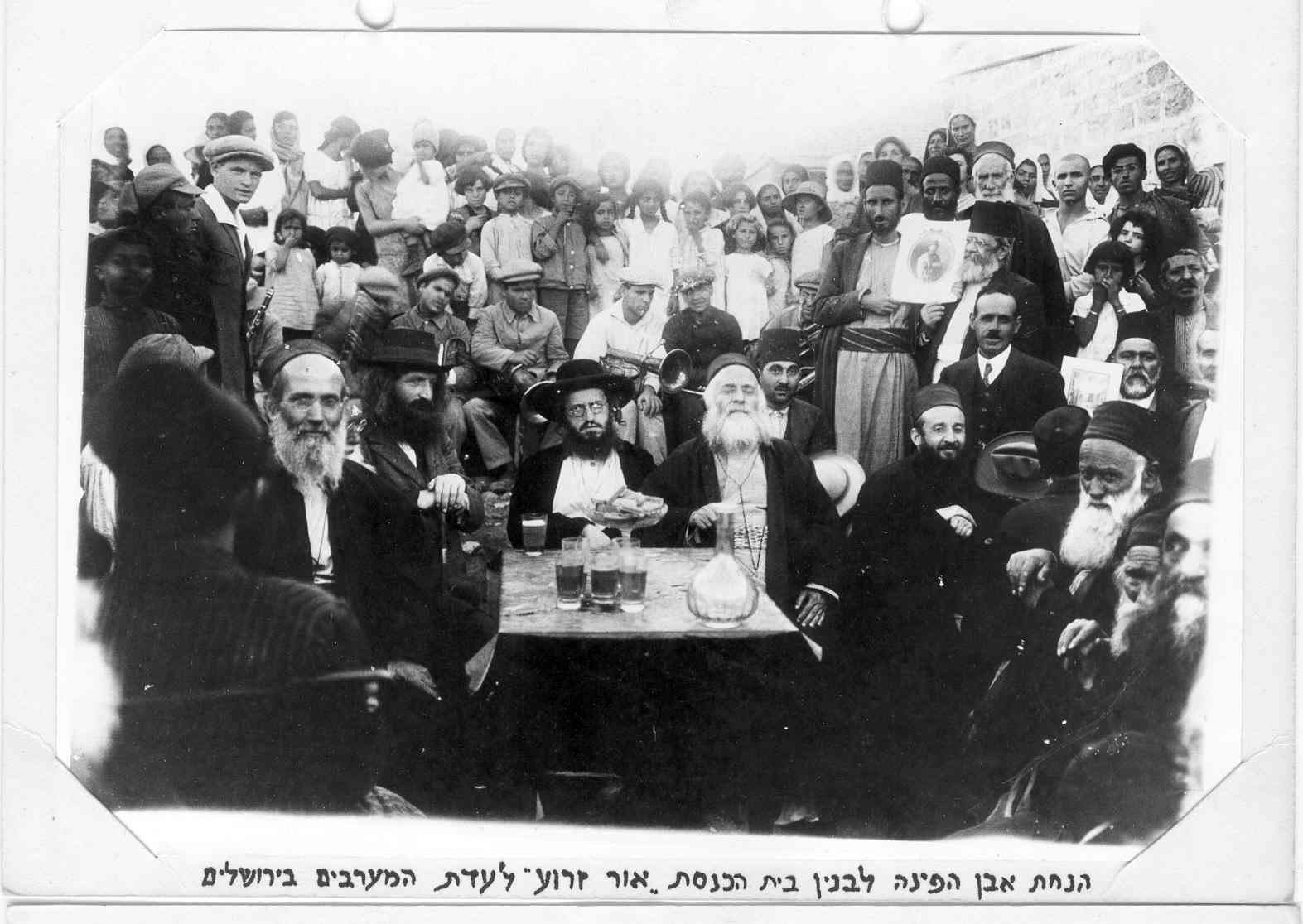
Cornerstone-laying ceremony for the Or Zaruaa synagogue, 1926

In 1920 Aburbeh was among the founders of the new Jerusalem neighborhood of Bayit Vegan. In 1926 he founded and built a new synagogue in the Nachlaot neighborhood for the Ma'araviim congregation called Or Zaruaa, which he named after the beit midrash headed by his father. This new synagogue included a beit midrash that he headed. Or Zaruaa Synagogue was chosen to be included as one of the buildings for preservation in Jerusalem. In 1930 Aburbeh was elected as an executive committee member of the Ma'araviim congregation in Jerusalem.

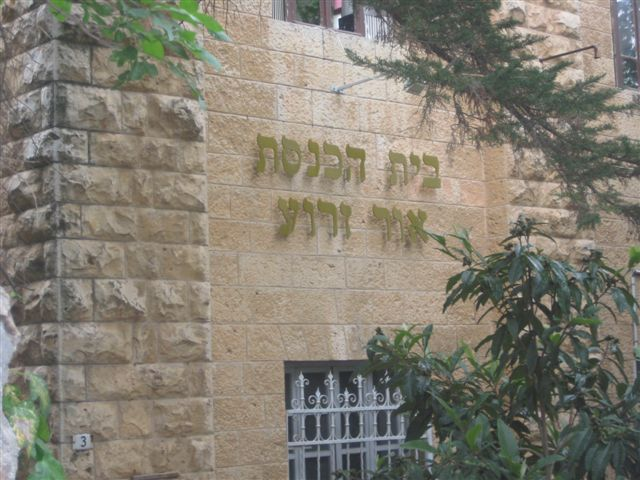
Or Zaruaa Synagogue

Rabbi Amram Aburbeh, a known philanthropist thanks to his multiple donations over the years 1940-1943 to the Sephardic General Orphanage in Jerusalem as his name appears among lists of two synagogues: The Avraham Memorial of the Ma'araviim congregation and Bayit VaGan of 100 mill (currency) and 50 mill (currency), respectively. He was an active Zionist, and took part in the struggle to establish the state of Israel. The British Mandate authorities in Palestine arrested him due to his connections with the Haganah paramilitary organization. During this time, Aburbeh volunteered for the Mishmar Ha'Am (People's Guard). His sons were members of the Notrim police force and later served in the Israel Defense Forces.

An official publication Reshumot (Portofolio of Notifications 130) announcement on the election to Jerusalem municipality council, that were held on 14 November 1950, states that among the approved candidates Rabbi Amram Aburbeh was candidate number 7 to honor the Yichud Shevet Yehudah party candidates list, representing the religious Sephardi Jews.

In 1951 Aburbeh was elected by the Chief Rabbinate of Israel Council as Chief Rabbi of the Sephardic congregation of Petah Tikva. He served alongside the city's Ashkenazi chief rabbi, Rabbi Reuven Katz. Aburbeh gave lectures in several of Petah Tikva's downtown synagogues, including Beth Israel, Ohel Chaim, and Beit Avraham (called the "Great Sephardic Synagogue", which he founded). On Shabbat he gave lectures in additional neighborhoods. He was a member of the Chief Rabbinate of Israel Council and chairman of the National Rabbinical Council of the Sephardic community.

Aburbeh died on December 20, 1966 (7 Tevet 5727) in Petah Tikva and was buried in the Segula cemetery in that city beside his wife, Rivka.

== Works ==
- Netivei Am (Hebrew: נתיבי-עם), Jerusalem customs, responsa and collected sermons, published in two volumes; Vol. 1 pub. 1963, Vol. 2 pub. 1966; second edition 1969.third edition 1977, fourth edition 1989, fifth edition 2006. sixth edition 2014 נתיבי עם. He received approbations for his sefarim from Rabbi Ovadia Hadaya, Rabb Ezra Attiya, Chief Rabbi Ovadia Yosef, and in later editions published by his sons Chief Rabbi Eliyahu Bakshi-Doron, Rabbi She'ar Yashuv Cohen, and Chief Rabbi Shlomo Amar; the latter was one of the last students to be rabbinically ordained by Aburbeh. Chief Rabbi Yitzhak Yosef cited from Netive Am book by Rabbi Amram Aburbeh, during a Rosh Hashanah lecture about the Halakha concerning Ten Days of Repentance prayers of Tefilat Amidah Shemoneh Esreh, Hamelech Hamishpat .
- ספר שבחי האר״י [Sefer Shivchei HaAri] (in Ladino). 1911.
- ברית עולם [Brit Olam]. Amram Aburbeh. 1948.
- חסד ואמת [Chesed Ve'Emet: Jewish mourning laws and customs]. Chevra Kadisha Jerusalem. 1996.

Aburbeh also edited the prayer book (siddur) Siddur Rinat Israel Rinat Yisrael Sephardic and Edot ha-Mizrach Nusach and composed a special prayer for the recovery of injured Israeli soldiers.

=== Selected articles ===
- "Law of Shvi'it fruits". Kol-Tora: 16–17. August–September 1958.
- "On the purity of Shvi'it fruits". Kol-Tora: 23. April–May 1959.
- "Comments". Kol-Tora: 19. July–August 1959.
- "Pouring water on the Holiday". Kol-Tora: 10–13. September–October 1960.
- "This is the beginning of the redemption" (PDF). Yesha Shelanu (76): 4–5. December 2007. Archived from the original (PDF) on 2013-10-20.
- "Cohanim blessing". Or Torah (51): 63. July 1972.

== Memorials ==
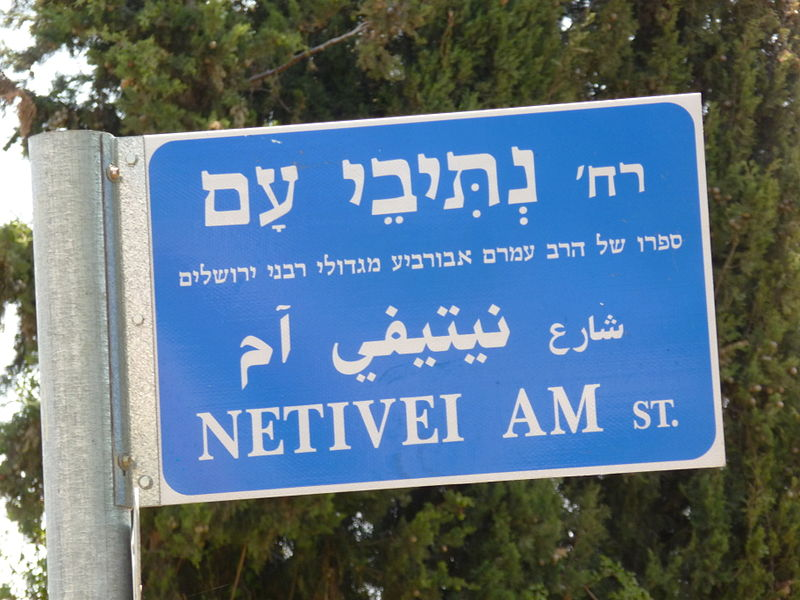
Netivei Am Street in the Ramot Alon neighbourhood of Jerusalem.

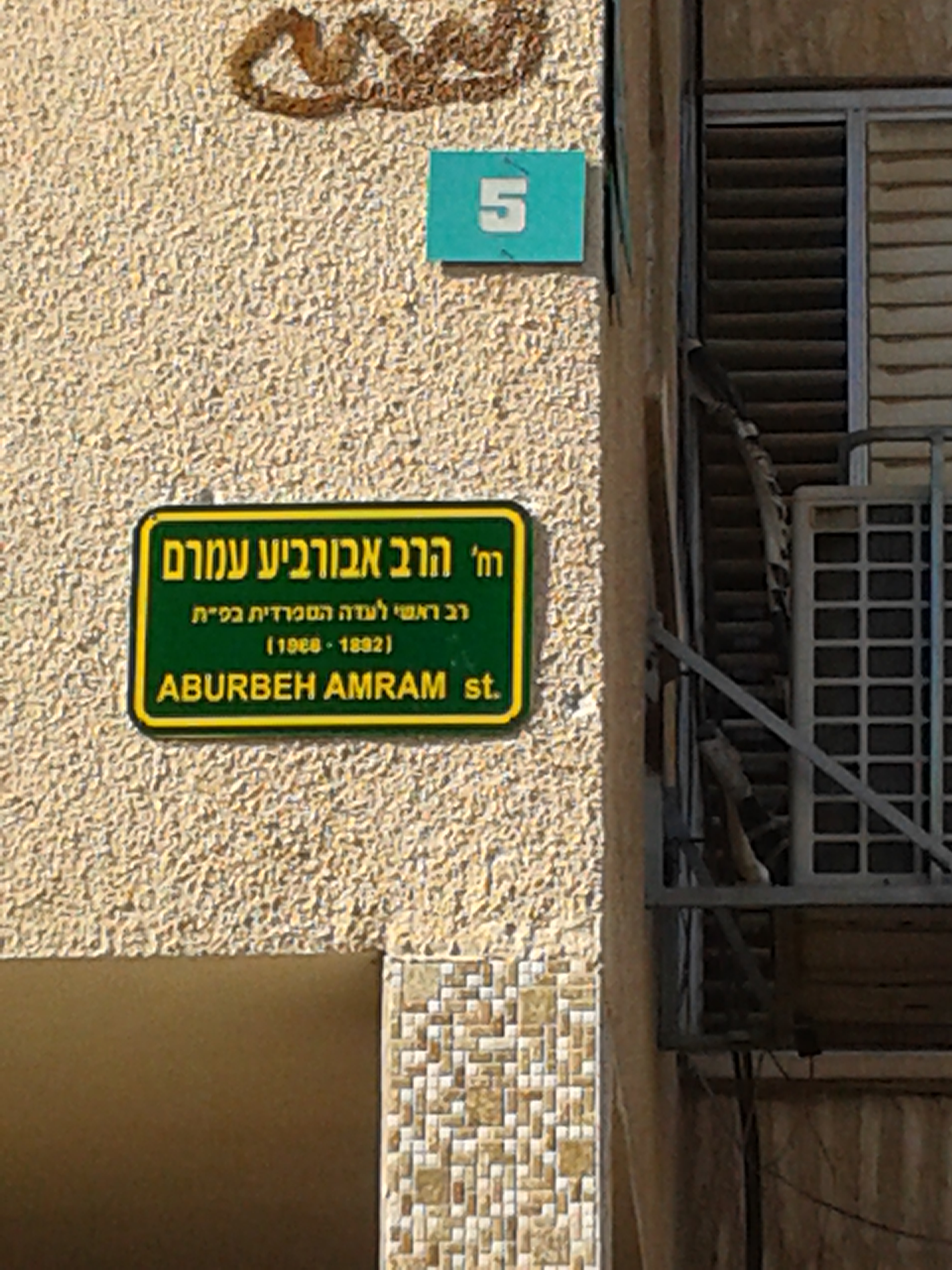
Amram Aburbeh street in the Ein Ganim neighbourhood Petah Tikva, Israel.

Memorials to Aburbeh were dedicated in several places and institutions in Israel:

- Netivei Am AMIT schools, in Beersheba and Yeruham Toranic and Scientific Education branches
- Netivei Am Street in the Ramot Alon neighbourhood of Jerusalem; Aburbeh Street in the Ein Ganim neighbourhood of Petah Tikva

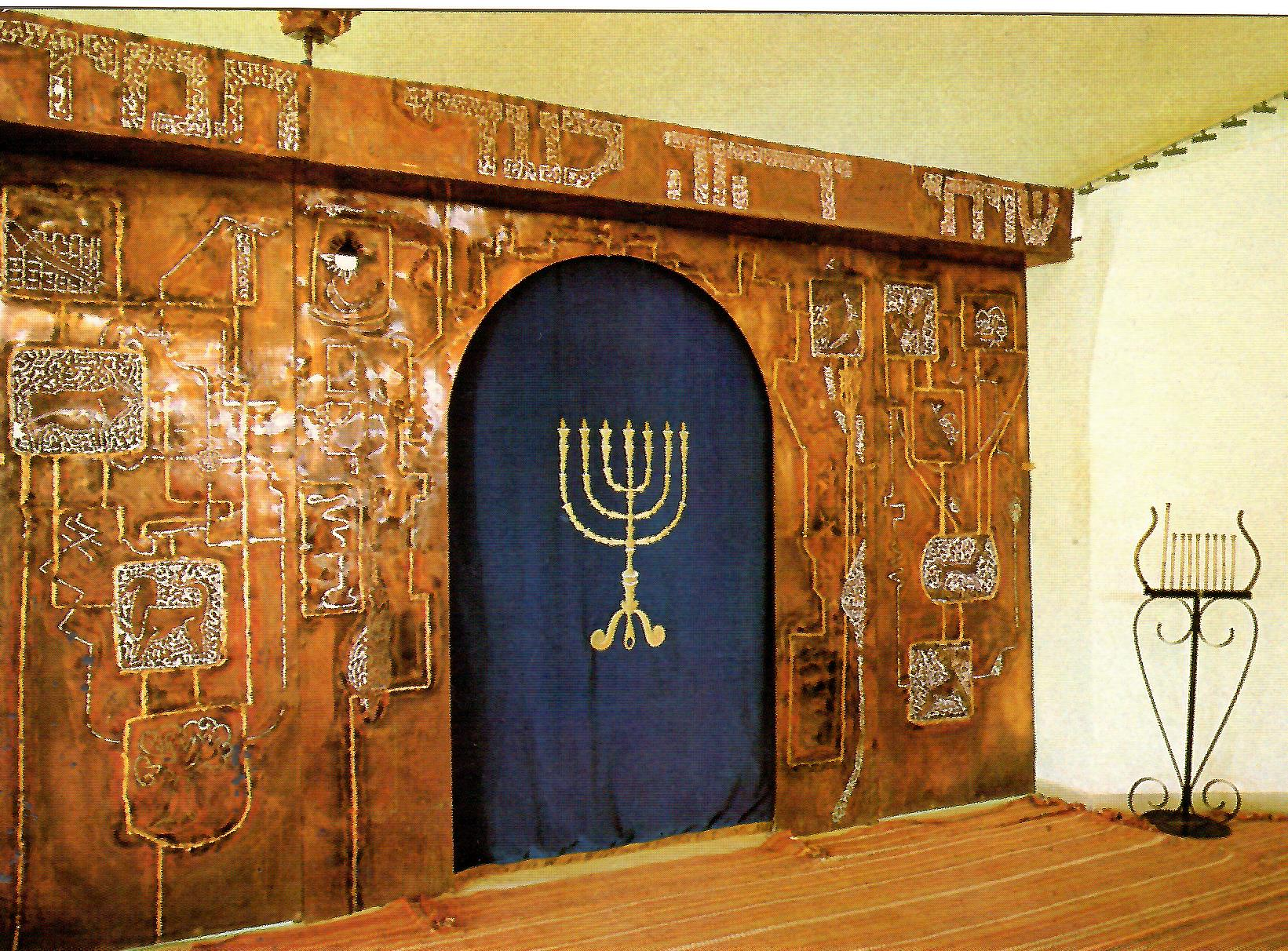
Beit HaKnesset HaAl-Adati HaKippah Synagogue and Beit HaMidrash Netivei-Am, Shechunah Hey Ledugma, Beer-Sheva, Interior image. 1971.

- Netivei Am organization to acquire rescue equipment
- Or Zaruaa Synagogue unveiling of metal plate event honoring and commemorating Rabbi Amram Aburbeh as founder of the synagogue for the Ma'araviim community in Nachlaot neighbourhood with the participants Chief Rabbi Eliyahu Bakshi-Doron, and Chief Rabbi Shlomo Amar.

== Gallery ==
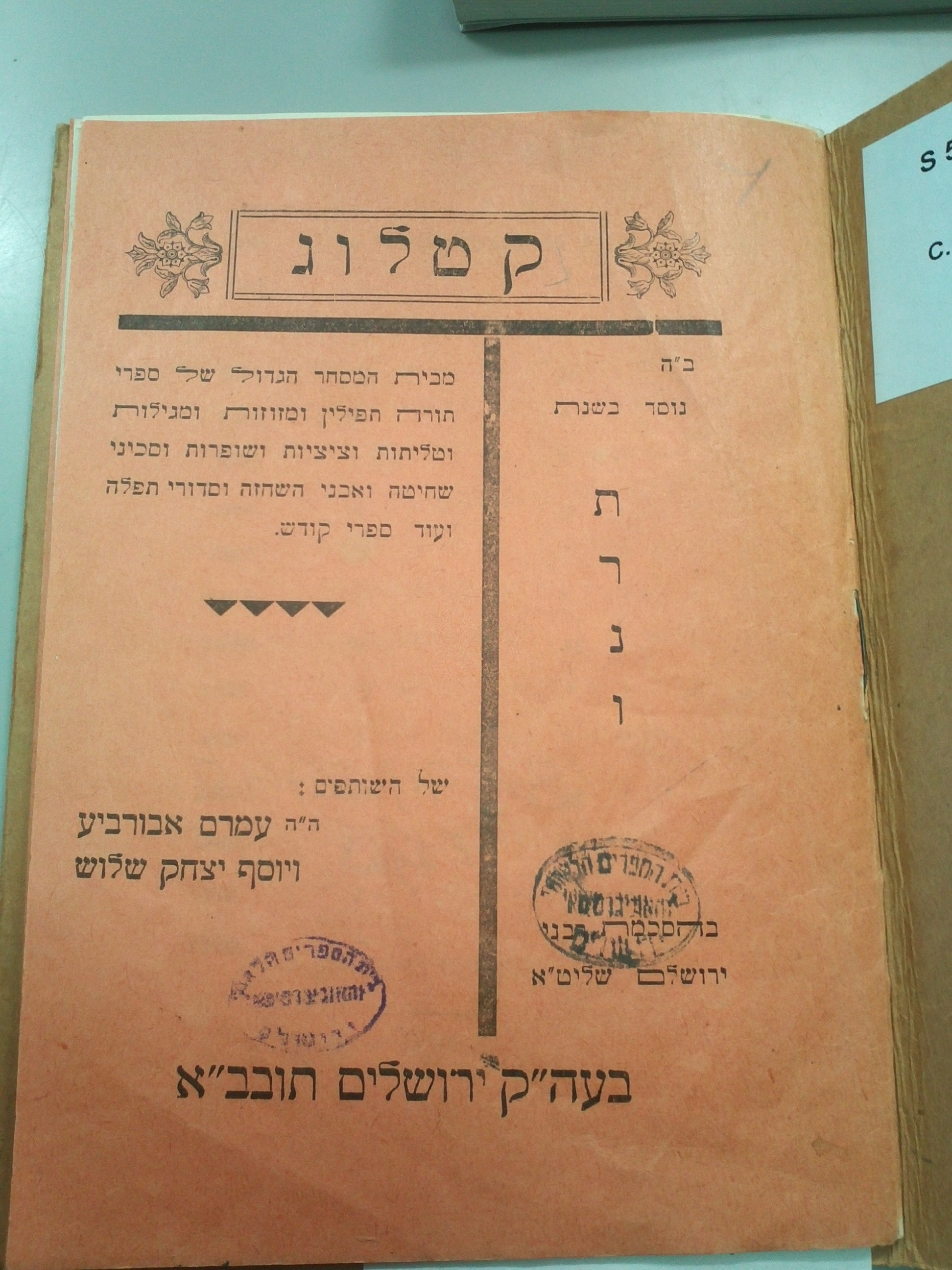
Aburbeh's and Shloush's Judaica store catalogue.

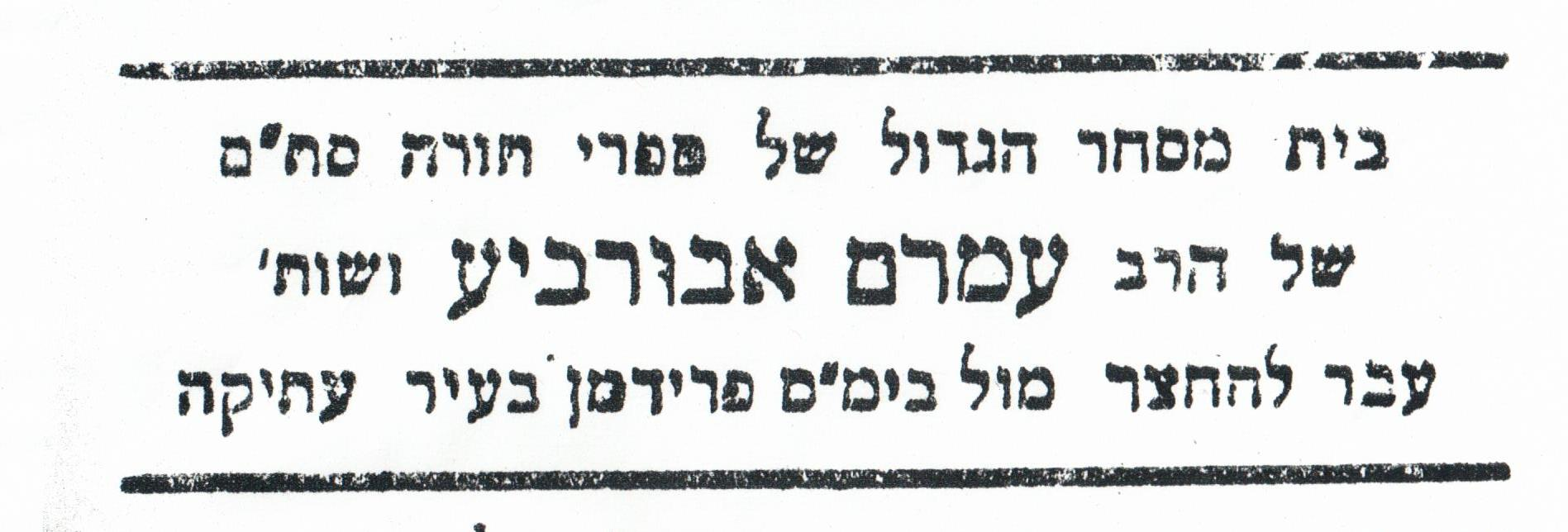
1930 advertisement: "Rabbi Amram Aburbeh's big store for Torah scrolls, Tefillin and Mezuzahs moved to the yard in front of Friedman store in the Old City of Jerusalem".

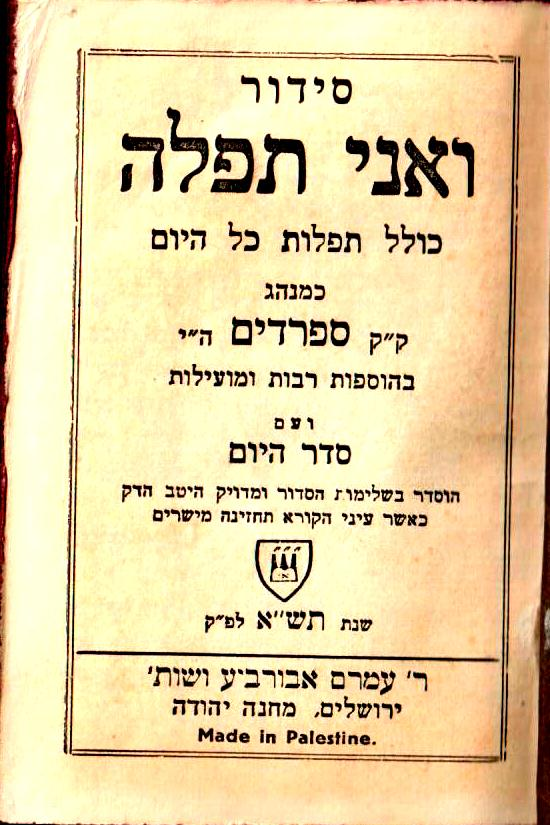
Title page of Siddur V'Ani Tefilah, a 1941 Sephardic prayerbook Aburbeh punished.

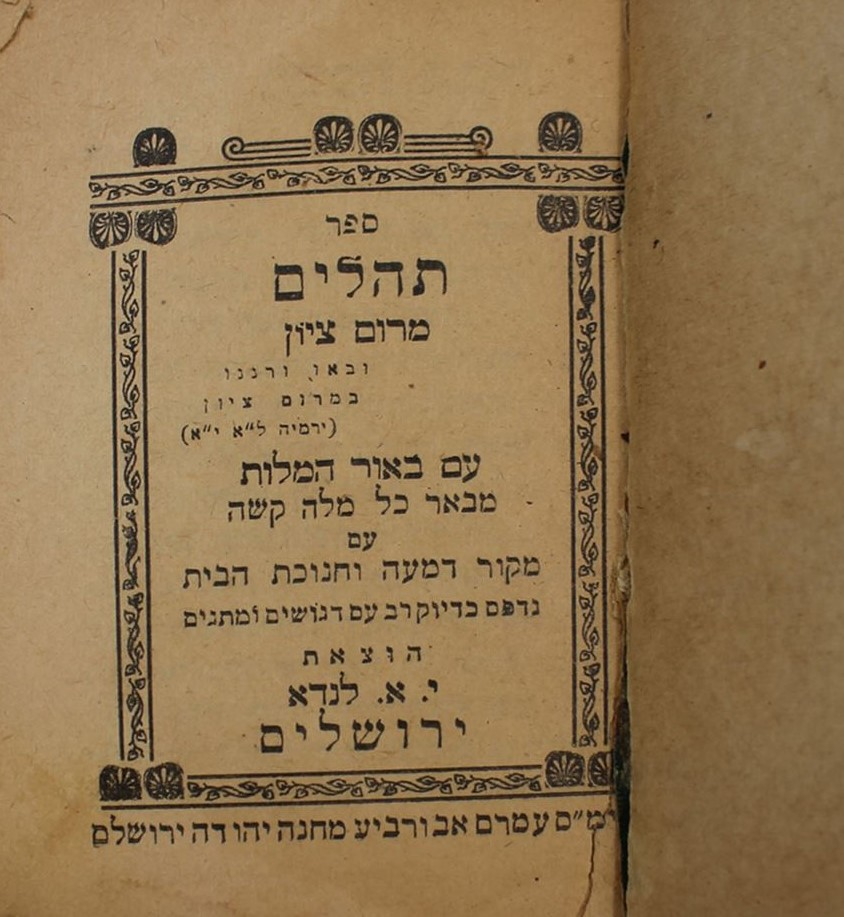
Sefer Tehilim (Psalms book) Marom Zion. Amram Aburbeh bookstore, Mahane Yehudah, Jerusalem.

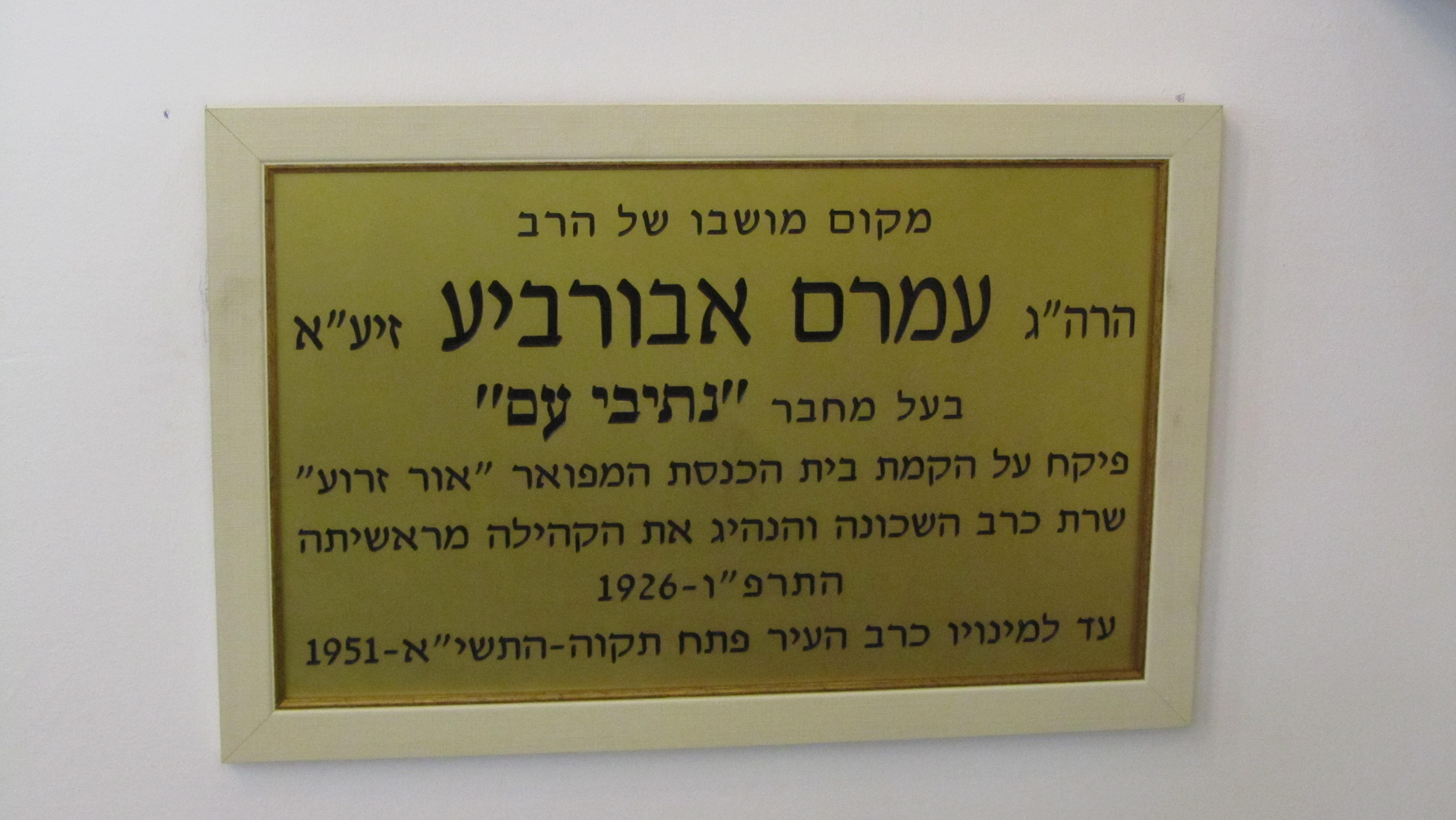
Memorial plaque at Or Zaruaa synagogue where he was rabbi from 1927-1951.

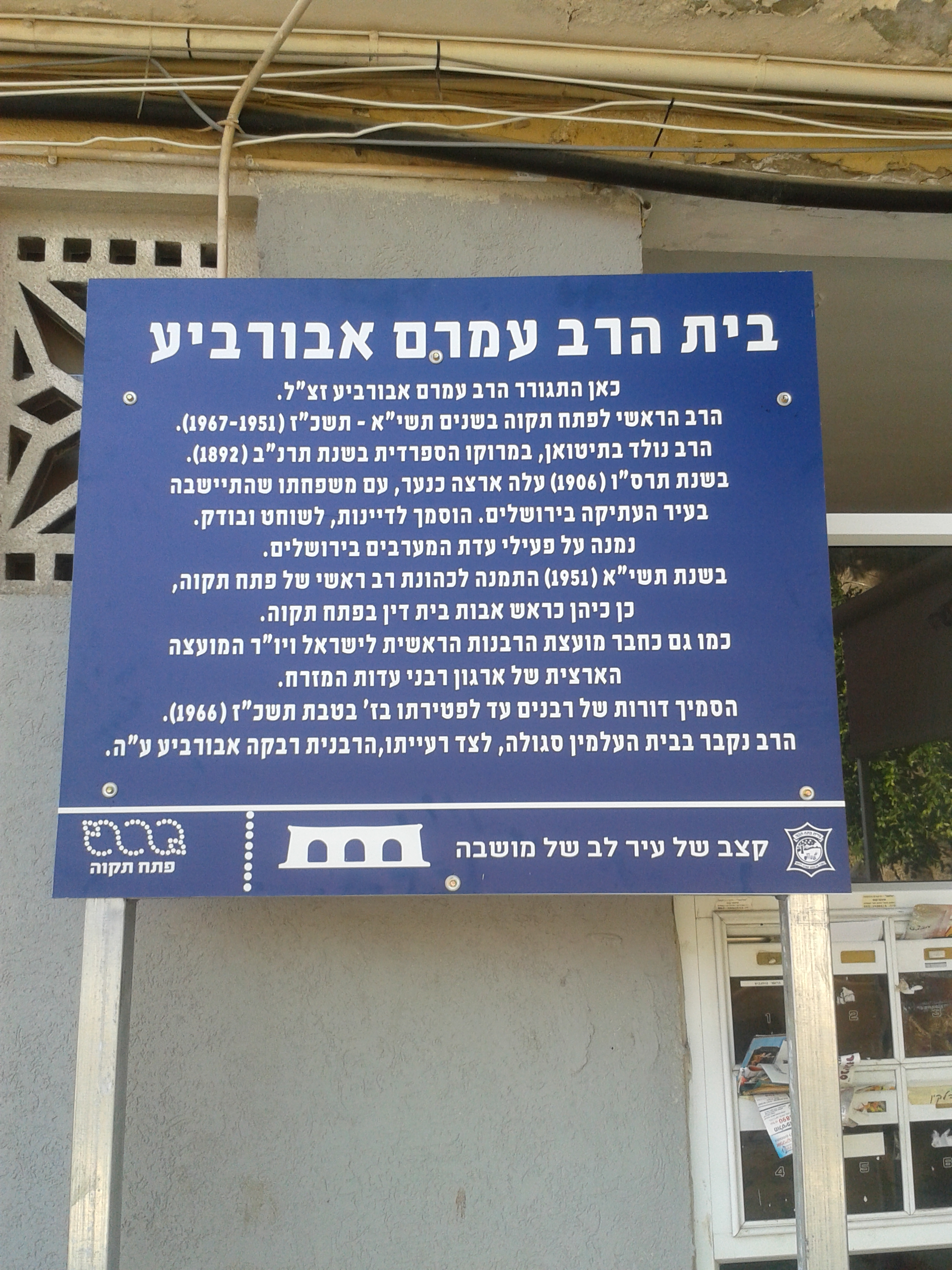
Aburbeh's home.
