= Jacob Alyashar =

Ottoman Talmudist & emissary (1730–c.1790)

- יעקב אלישר

Personal life
- Born: 1730 Hebron, Ottoman Empire
- Died: c. 1790 Safed, Ottoman Empire
- Children: Eliezer Jeruḥam
- Notable work: Megillat Paras
- Occupation: Talmudist, emissary

Religious life
- Religion: Judaism

Jacob Alyashar (Hebrew: יעקב אלישר) was an 18th-century Talmudist and emissary (meshullaḥ).

He was a friend and travelling companion of Chaim Yosef David Azulai who mentions him in his works.

== Biography ==
Alyashar was born at Hebron in 1730. He was educated in Torah at the yeshivas of Hebron and at a young age he was counted among the heads of the community.

In 1773, the congregation at Hebron sent him abroad as their emissary. Afterwards he was sent by the congregation of Jerusalem as an emissary to Kurdistan. While he was in Basra (Iraq), the Shah of Persia announced a war on the city and all the Jews were in great danger. However, in the end, the war was not carried out. He celebrated this deliverance in Hebrew verses called "Megillat Paras" (The Scroll of Persia). In Basra he received the report of the death of his wife and it was there that he married his second wife and where their son, Eliezer Jeruḥam, was born. After he returned from Basra, he settled in Safed where in 1783 he stood at the head of the community.

He died in Safed about 1790.

== Megillat Paras ==
"Megillat Paras" was published by his grandson (son of Eliezer Jeruḥam), Rabbi Jacob Saul Alyashar, in "Ish Emunim" (Jerusalem, 1885). It was read by the Jews of Basra and by his family members each year on the second day of Nisan.
