= Aharon Azriel =

Israeli Kabbalist (1818–1879)

Rabbi Aharon Azriel
- אהרן עזריאל

Personal life
- Born: 1818 Jerusalem
- Died: May 3, 1879 (aged 60–61) Jaffa, Ottoman Palestine
- Spouse: Mazal, daughter of Rabbi Eliezer Papo
- Children: Moses, Raphael Yehoshua, Sarah
- Parent(s): Azriel (known as Konorti) and Luna
- Known for: Head of the Beit El Kabbalist yeshiva in the Old City of Jerusalem
- Occupation: Rabbi, Kabbalist, Head of Beit El Kabbalist yeshiva

Religious life
- Religion: Judaism
- Denomination: Orthodox

Jewish leader
- Students: Yaakov Meir

Rabbi Aharon Azriel, (Hebrew: אהרן עזריאל, 1818 – May 3, 1879) was a kabbalist and the head of the Beit El Kabbalist yeshiva in the Old City of Jerusalem between 1871–1879.

== Biography ==
He was born in Jerusalem to Rabbi Azriel (known as Konorti) and Luna, the daughter of Rabbi Aharon Halevi, author of the book "Mateh Aharon." His grandfather was Rabbi Yehuda Avraham, son of Rabbi Avigdor Ezriel, author of the books "Zimrat Haaretz" and "Kessef HaKipurim" and a close friend of the Kabbalist Shalom Sharabi known by the acronym RaSHaSH). He studied under Rabbi Nissim Shmuel Yehuda Aruach and Rabbi Yedidia Rafael Abulafia, and after the latter's death, he took his place as head of the Kabbalistic yeshiva Beit El. In addition, for twenty years he served as the Chief Rabbi of the Sephardic community in Jerusalem. Among his students was Rabbi Yaakov Meir, who later became the Sephardic Chief Rabbi of Salonica, and then later Palestine and later Israel (Rishon LeZion).

Rabbi Aharon travelled several times as an emissary on behalf of the Jerusalem and Hebron communities and as an emissary of the Beit El Yeshiva in Jerusalem. Between the years 1849-1853 he traveled to Libya, Tunisia, and Algeria. In the introduction to his book "Mikveh Mayim" he mentions the names of the benefactors who contributed towards the publication of the book from the Tunisian cities of Nabeul, Sousse, Monastir, Moknine and Béja and also from Algiers. On page 26 there is a sermon that he delivered in Tunis for the anniversary of Rabbi Abraham HaCohen Yitzhaki in 1866. On page 42 there is another sermon that he delivered in Tunis in 1863 about the passing of Rabbi Yehoshua (Yeshuah) Tzafij and others.

Many of his Piyyutim (liturgical poems) were accepted in most Sefardi communities of the Middle East and are sung on festivals and celebrations. His songs "Omer laHashem mahosi" ("I say to God my Refuge") and "Ima Rachel" ("Mother Rachel") were printed at the beginning of his book "Kapei Aharon". Some of his songs were printed in the books "Yitzchak Yiranen" by Rabbi Raphael Isaac Altaras and "Yagel Yaakov" by Rabbi Jacob Chai Burla.

In Tammuz (July) 1871, the Shevet Achim Yeshiva opened in Jerusalem for Jews from Bosnia who had settled in the city. The yeshiva was located in the house of Rabbi Aharon Azriel, who headed it. He also served as president of the "Maskil El Dal" society.

In Tevet 1874, he became very ill and viewed his recovery as a miracle, which he addressed in the introduction to his book "Kapei Aharon" which he was working on publishing at the time. He wrote:

And now I will remember the kindnesses of God, praises like for all rewards, for in this past harsh winter, on the 10th of Tevet I fell ill and I was like suspended between life and death - may the Merciful One save us...

In his later years, he suffered a heart attack and moved to live in Jaffa on the advice of his doctors, in the hope that the proximity to the sea would improve his condition. During this time, he defended the kosher status of the Etrogim of Jaffa during the "Etrog Debate". Rabbi Aaron Azriel died at age 60 on Shabbat, the 9th of Sivan, 5679 (May 3rd, 1879) and was buried in the Jewish cemetery in Jaffa. His gravestone bears the following inscription:

And it was when Aaron traveled according to the word and went out from Bat Zion and descended to Jaffa / A voice came forth from Heaven, Aaron was gathered

And it was when the word of the King, King of the Universe was heard / A weeping voice was heard from Zion, the rivers lifted up their voice and wept for Aaron

And it was the voice of the earth bitterly lamenting, saying 'Woe to the land of Israel crying out in her pangs, in this shall Aaron come"

And there was a man of Ramathaim, a holy and exalted rabbi and head of the Sanhedrin / Resembling an angel of God of Hosts, the wondrous rabbi, the divine Kabbalist withholding no secret from God

Our Rabbi Aaron Azriel, may his memory be a blessing, author of Kapei Aharon / Died on the 9th of Sivan in the year 5679, may his soul be bound in the bonds of eternal life

== Family ==
Rabbi Aaron Azriel married Mazal, the daughter of Rabbi Eliezer Papo (author of the book "Pele Yoetz"). Mazal died while giving birth to their firstborn son Moses on the 22nd of Tishrei, 5602 (1842). After the mourning period ended, he remarried and had: Raphael Yehoshua Azriel, who married Levanah the daughter of the Rishon LeZion Jacob Meir, and Sarah who married Israel Chafetz, one of the leaders of the Bukaharan community in Jerusalem and the son of David Chafetz, the first immigrant from Bukhara who arrived in Eretz Yisrael with his family in 1871, and settled in the courtyard of Rabbi Aaron Azriel.

His grandson from his son Moses was Rabbi Abraham Azriel, head of the Sefardi Beth Din and administrator of the Shevet Achim Yeshiva. His great-grandson was Moses Azriel, publisher of the newspapers El Liberal and Haherut. His great-great grandson was Joseph Azriel, an advocate for Sefardi Jews.

== Bibliography ==
- Kapei Aharon vol. 1 and vol. 2 responsa.
- Ozen Aharon and Ara Samichata an alphabetically arranged collection of halachic rulings that were given by him and his Beth din, including laws general of divorce and customs of Jerusalem in particular.
- Mikveh Mayim vol 1 and vol. 2 a collection of sermons, compiled and printed by his son Raphael-Yehoshua.
- Likutim, Zichronot and Chiddushim,
- Korban Aharon on the festivals, published in his grandfather Rabbi Avigdor Azriel's book, Zimrat Haaretz
- Zera Aharon, a selection of commentaries on the Talmud and festivals.
- Musar Avi (My Father's Teachings), a letter which he wrote to his eldest son Moses, while on a mission on behalf of the Beit El Yeshiva to the island of Corfu, instructing him on how to conduct himself with people.
