= Or Zaruaa Synagogue =

Orthodox synagogue in Jerusalem, Israel

- (Hebrew: בית כנסת אור זרוע, נחלאות, ירושלים)
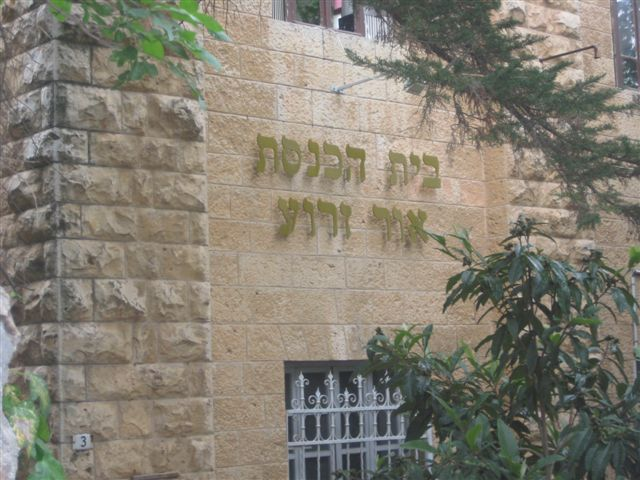
- The synagogue façade, in 2009

- Location of the synagogue in Jerusalem

Religion
- Affiliation: Orthodox Judaism
- Rite: Nusach Sefard
- Ecclesiastical or organizational status: Synagogue; Preservation site architectural and cultural heritage protection
- Status: Active

Location
- Location: 3 Shmuel Refaeli Street, Nachlaot, Jerusalem
- Country: Israel
- Interactive map of Or Zaruaa Synagogue
- Coordinates: 31°46′49″N 35°12′45″E

Architecture
- Type: Synagogue architecture
- Style: Neo-Mauresque
- Founder: Rabbi Amram Aburbeh
- Groundbreaking: 1926
- Completed: 1927

Specifications
- Direction of façade: East
- Capacity: 150 worshippers
- Materials: Jerusalem stone

The Or Zaruaa Synagogue (Hebrew: בית כנסת אור זרוע, נחלאות, ירושלים) is an Orthodox Jewish congregation and synagogue, located at 3 Shmuel Refaeli Street, in the Nachlaot Ahim neighbourhood of Jerusalem. The congregation was founded in 1926 (Note: 5687 in the Jewish calendar.) by Rabbi Amram Aburbeh for Maghrebi Jews from North Africa.

The synagogue was named Or Zaruaa after the Beth Midrash (study hall) Aburbeh's father Rabbi Shlomo Aburbeh held in his home in Avraham Azriel's court in the Old City of Jerusalem.

== Building ==
The Or Zaruaa Synagogue is listed among the sites for historic preservation by the Jerusalem municipality. (Note: The official document of the government of Israel Reshumot Portofolio of notifications, from November 5, 1989 states that Or Zaruaa synagogue is building number 14 among the list of buildings having architectural and/or historic value in the center of the city Jerusalem - plan 3242, documentation files, the site number 2638.) The preservation site number of the synagogue is 2638. On 19 February 1997, Judge V. Ziler, President of the Jerusalem District Court, ruled the synagogue was permanently hekdesh, (הקדש). (Note: hekdesh is a Hebrew term for a property held by a public institute, religious or non–religious, that serves a public use.)

=== Description ===
The Or Zaruaa Synagogue is 10 m (33 ft) high, built over two-stories, on a hill, 799 m (2,621 ft) above sea level, with an area of 258 m^{2} (2,780 sq ft), in the Nachlaot neighborhood in central Jerusalem. The exterior walls are covered with Jerusalem stone, as mandated for all buildings in Jerusalem. The first floor, originally built as a home for the rabbi, is a kindergarten. The synagogue itself, on the second floor, is designed in a Neo-Mauresque, or Spanish North-African style, where the men's seats surround the raised Bimah. The hall has a very high ceiling, and includes a women's section (ezrat nashim). Tall windows are accentuated by massive stone frames, curved at the top.

== History ==
To build a new synagogue for the growing number of Maghrebi Jews that were leaving the Old City of Jerusalem for newer neighborhoods, Aburbeh approached Don Yamin Ben Harroch, a philanthropist who led the Jewish community in Melilla, Spain, who contributed funds for its construction.

On October 26, 1926, (Note: 18 Cheshvan 5687.) the cornerstone laying ceremony for the building took place. Aburbeh said that only Jewish workers would be permitted to work on the building.

Aburbeh led the synagogue from 1926 until 1951, when he was elected Chief Rabbi in Petah Tikva, Israel.

== Activities ==
The synagogue was inaugurated in 1927 with Aburbeh as its rabbi. For a few years he lived in an apartment built for his family on the first floor of the building until he built a house nearby. The apartment then became the residence of Haim Kobi, the gabbai of the Synagogue, and his family for the next 40 years. Or Zaruaa was a beit midrash (study house), where lessons were taught, as well as a synagogue.

== Gallery ==
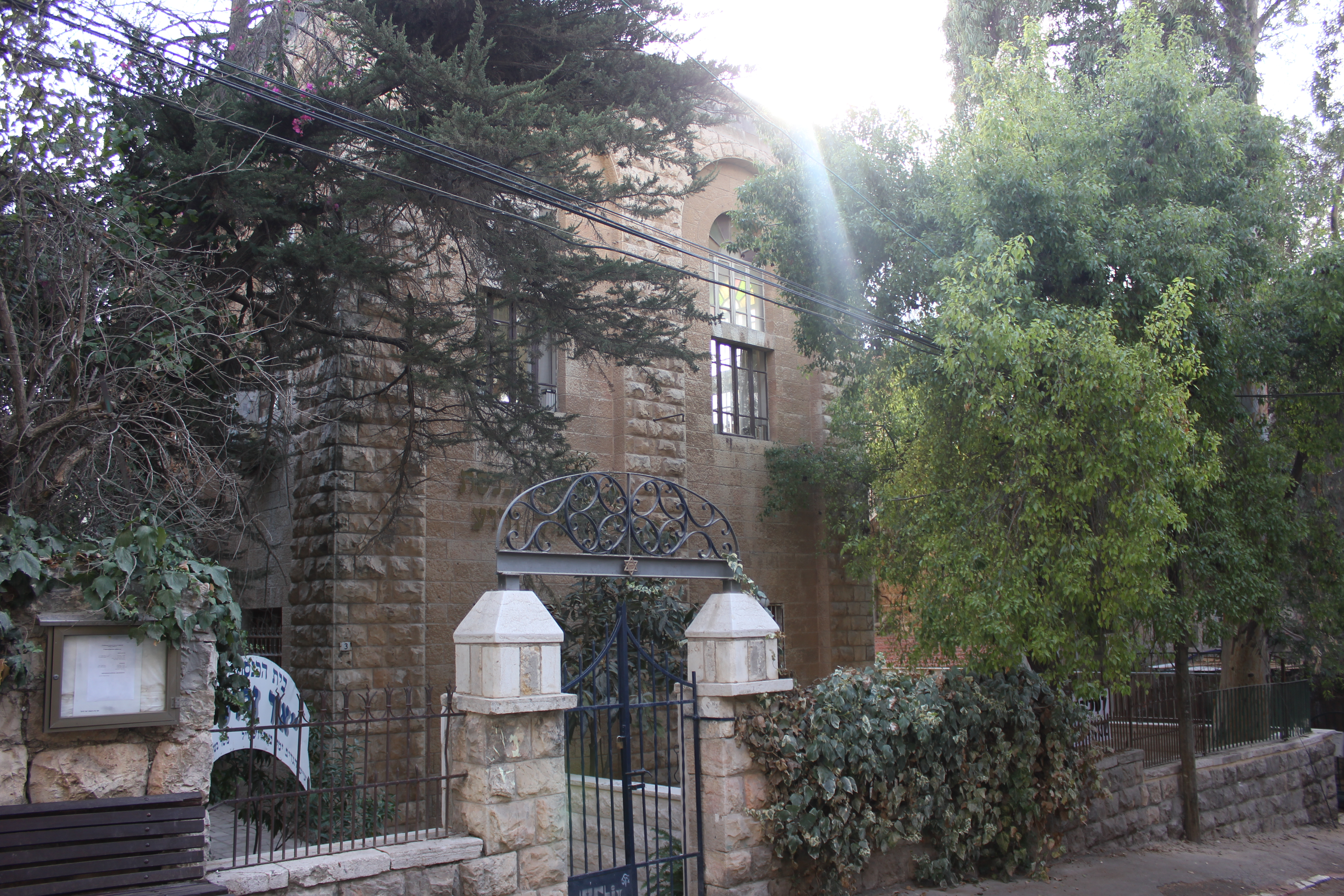
The synagogue exterior

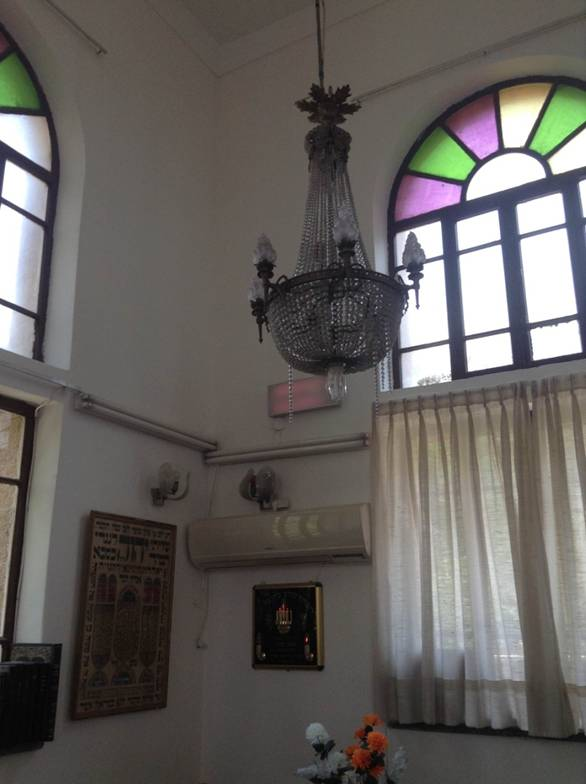
The synagogue interior with stained glass window

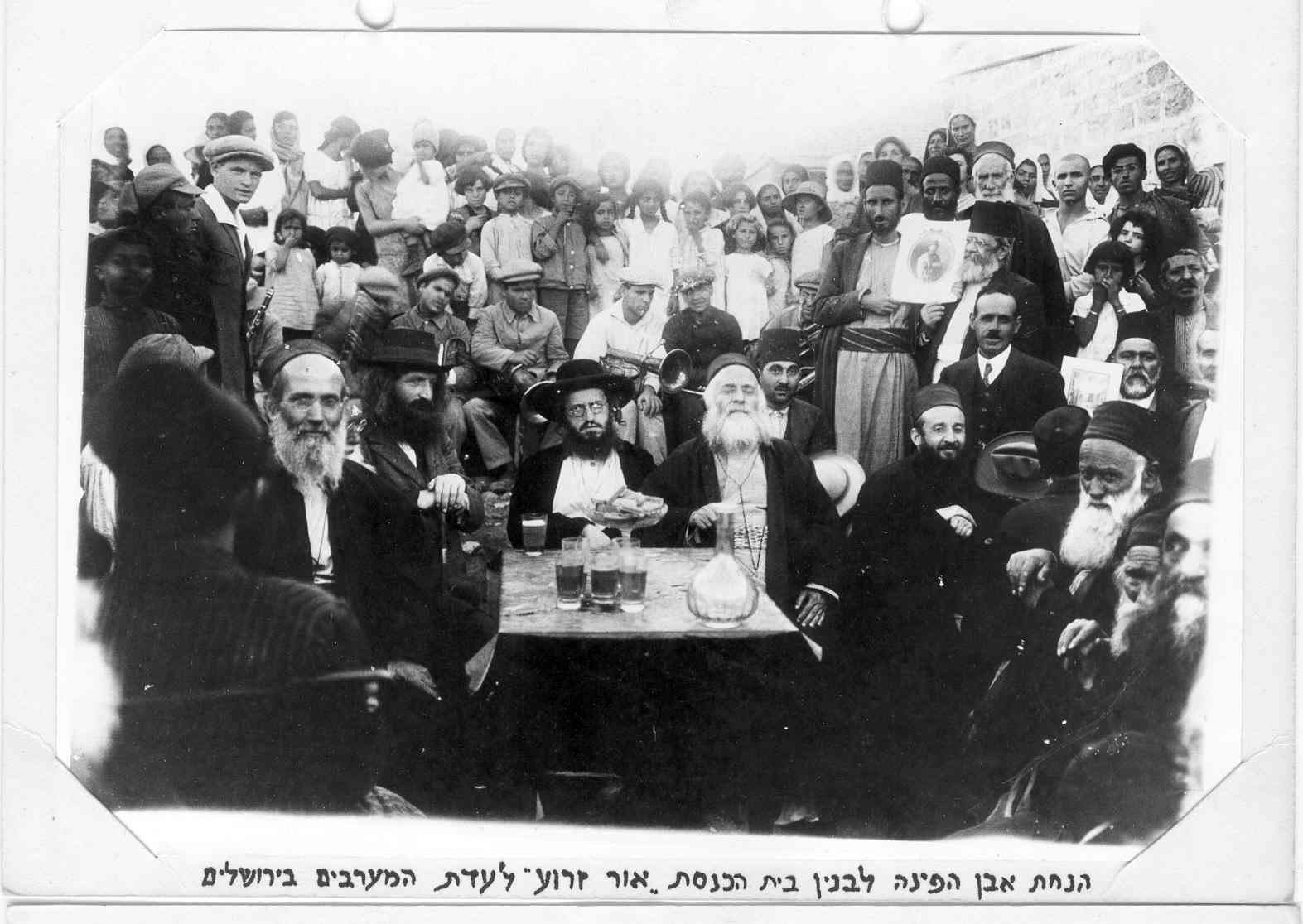
tCornerstone laying in 1926

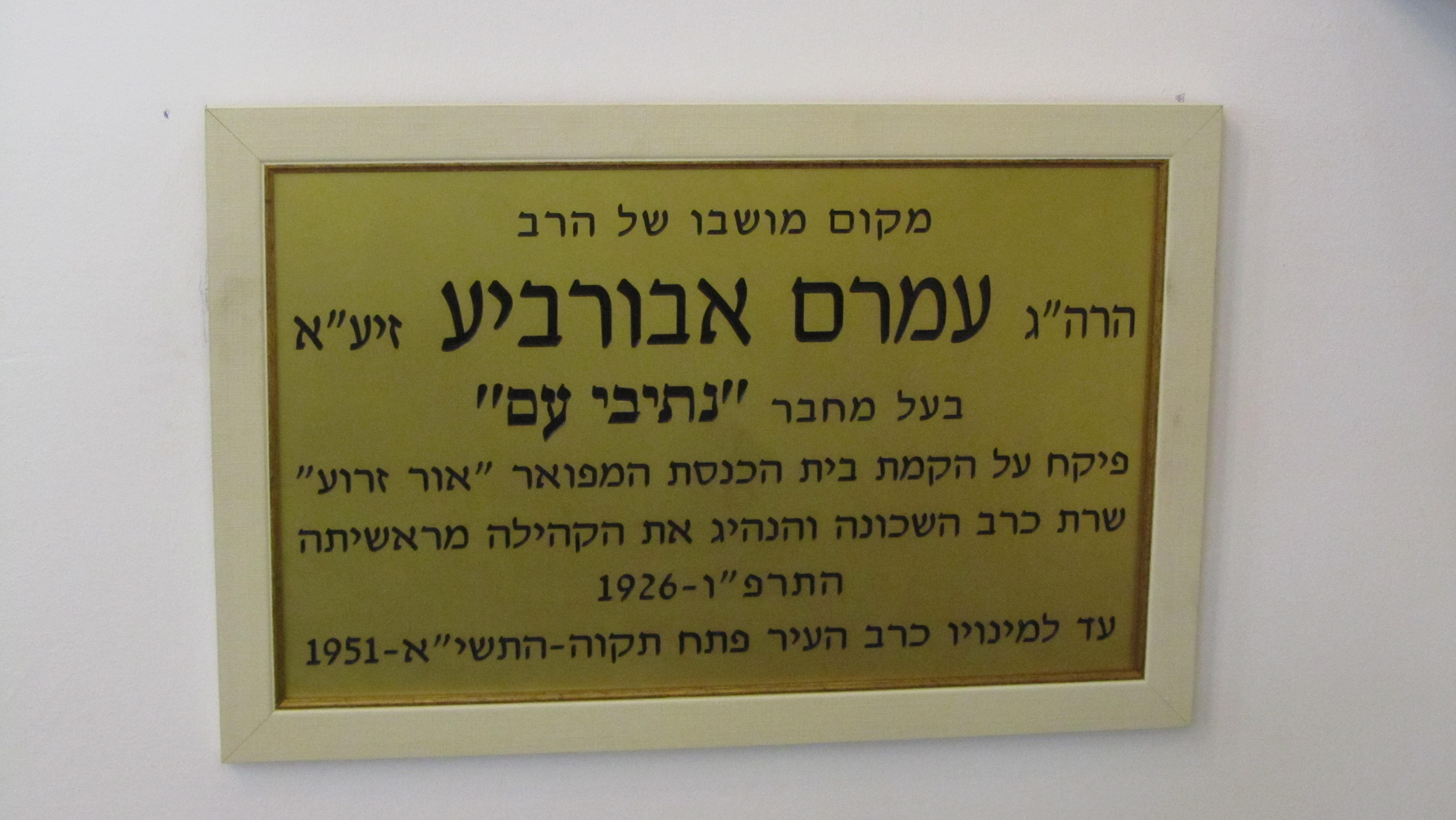
Rabbi Amram Aburbeh memorial plaque at Or Zaruaa synagogue.

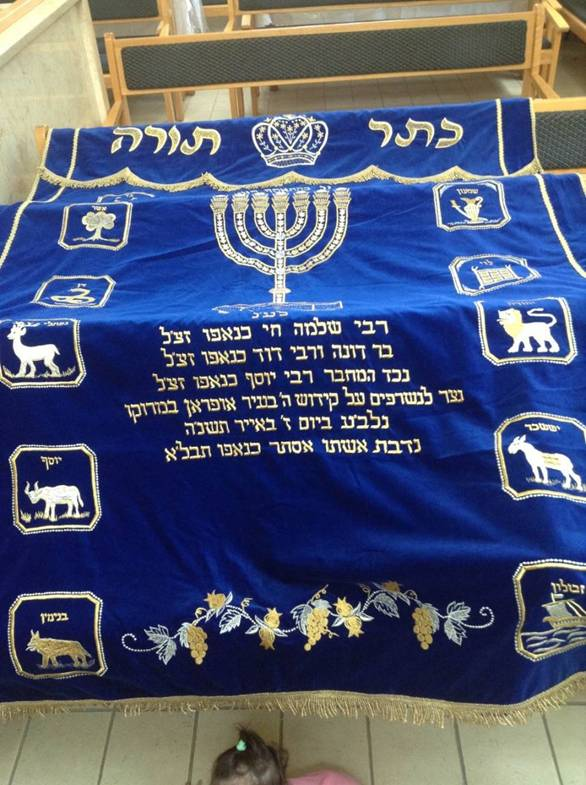
A memorial parochet to Rabbi Shlomo Hai Knafo donated by his wife Esther.

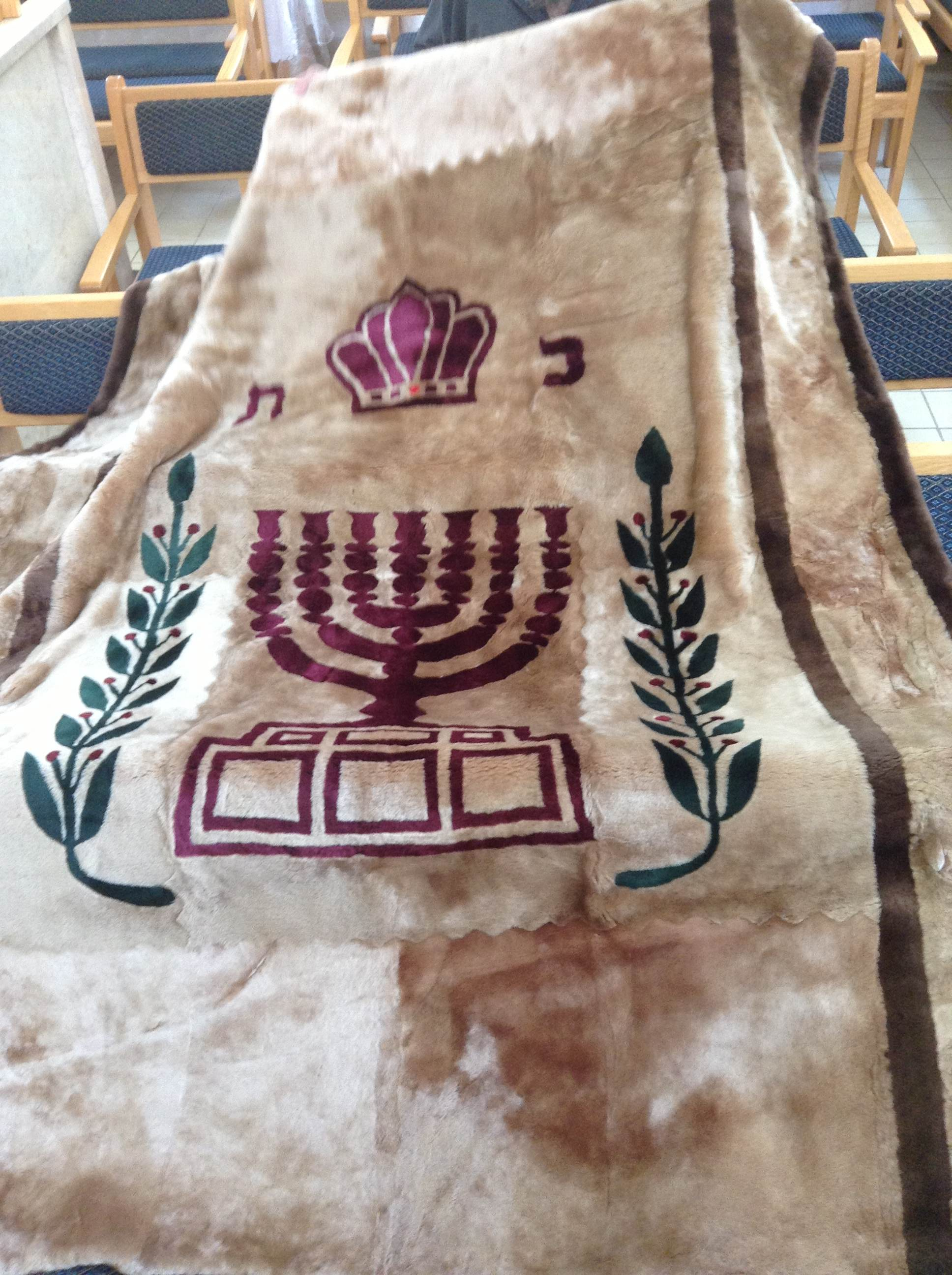
Parochet with the emblem of the State of Israel, Menorah, and olive tree branches with leaves.

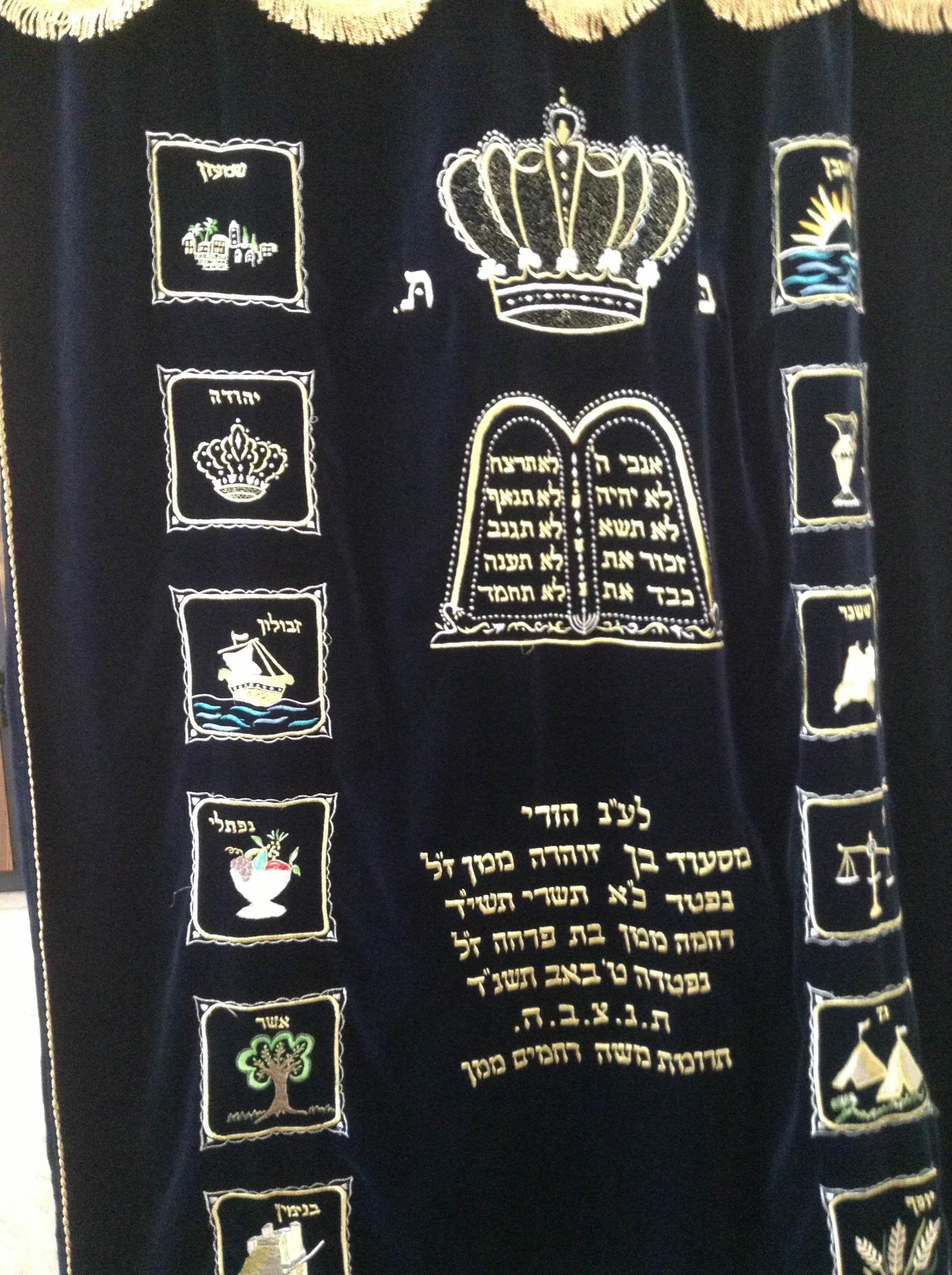
Parochet on Torah Ark (Aron Hakodesh) dark black background decorated with the symbols of the 12 tribes of the ancient Israelites.

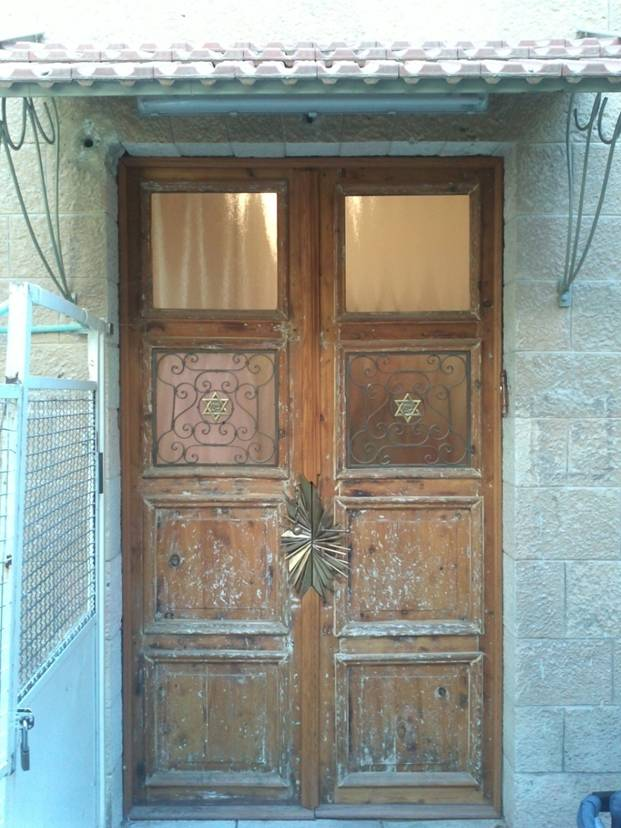
Wooden door entrance to first floor decorated with magen david (star of David) and the word Zion in Hebrew.

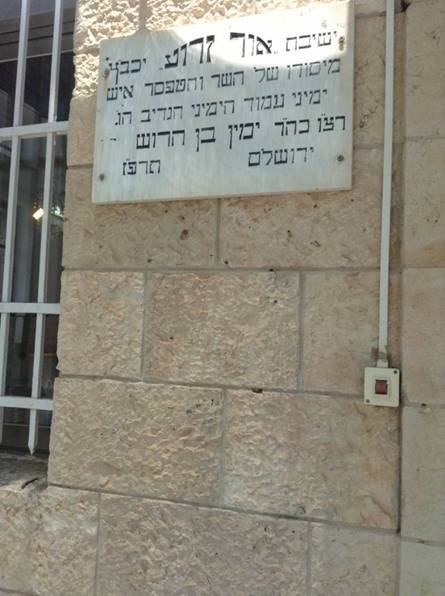
Stone commemorative plaque on the exterior wall stating: Yeshiva donated by Mr Yamin Ben Harroch in 1927.

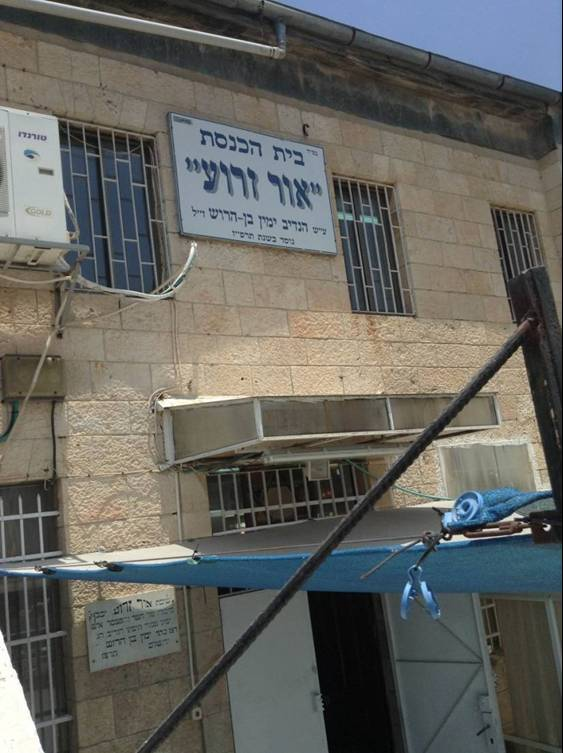
Exterior sign stating that the synagogue was supported by philanthropist Yamin Ben Harroch, and founded in the year 1927.

== See also ==
- History of the Jews in Israel
- List of synagogues in Israel
- Synagogues of Jerusalem
