= Yaakov Meir =

First Sephardic Chief Rabbi of Mandatory Palestine (1856–1939)

Rabbi Yaakov Meir
- יעקב מאיר
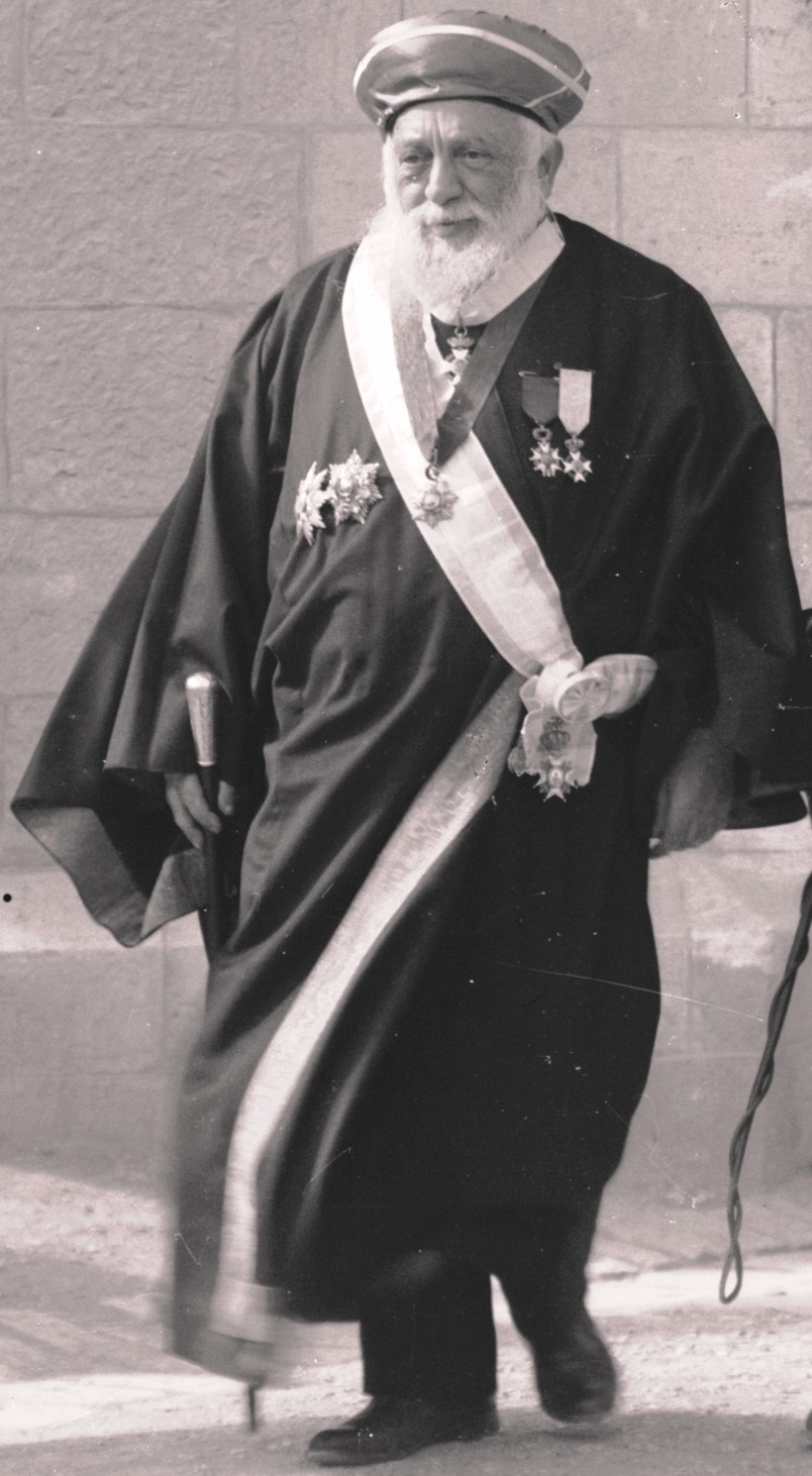

Personal life
- Born: 1856 Jerusalem, Damascus Eyalet, Ottoman Empire
- Died: May 26, 1939 (aged 82–83) Jerusalem, Mandatory Palestine
- Spouse: Rachel
- Parent: Calev Mercado
- Known for: First Sephardic Chief Rabbi under the British Mandate of Palestine
- Occupation: Sephardic Chief Rabbi of Palestine

Religious life
- Religion: Judaism
- Denomination: Orthodox

Jewish leader
- Awards: Commander of the Order of the British Empire; French Legion of Honor; Decorations from the Sultan of Turkey and the Greek government; Decoration from Hussein bin Ali, King of Hejaz

Yaakov Meir CBE (Hebrew: יעקב מאיר; 1856–1939), was an Orthodox rabbi, and the first Sephardic Chief Rabbi appointed under the British Mandate of Palestine. A Talmudic scholar, fluent in Hebrew as well as five other languages, he enjoyed a reputation as one of Jerusalem's most respected rabbis.

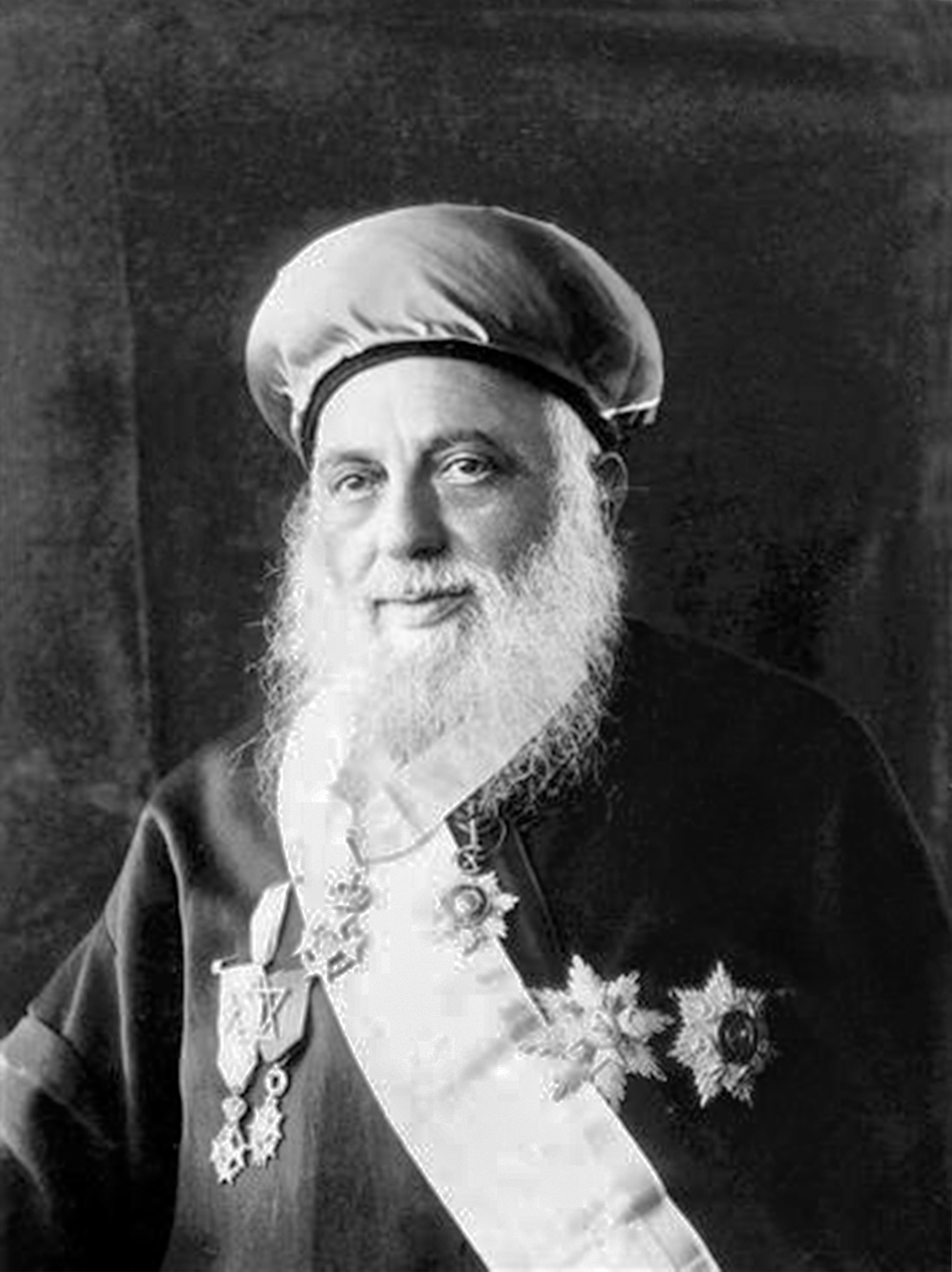
Rabbi Yaakov Meir

== Early life ==
Meir was born in Jerusalem in 1856, the son of successful merchant Calev Mercado. He studied the Talmud under Rabbi Menachem Bechor Yitzhak, and at age 15 began to study Kabbalah under Rabbi Aharon Azriel, an elder of the Beit El Synagogue. He married his wife Rachel at age 17, and continued to study Torah in the years after his marriage. He was among the founders of a Bikur cholim society in 1879 which established the Misgav Ladach Hospital in Jerusalem.

In 1882, he was sent to Bukhara as the first emissary to visit there. He was received with great respect by the Jews of Bukhara, and children were named for him during his stay. He was instrumental in encouraging the immigration of Bukhara Jews to the Land of Israel. In 1885, 1888, and 1900, he visited Tunisia and Algeria as an emissary. In 1888, he was appointed a member of the Beth Din of Rabbi Yaakov Shaul Elyashar in Jerusalem, serving in this position until 1899. Under Turkish rule, he often interceded with the authorities on behalf of the Jewish community; he also encouraged the construction of new Jewish quarters of Jerusalem, helping establish the new neighborhoods of Ezrat Yisrael, Yemin Moshe, and the Bukharim Quarter. He worked to bring the Sephardic and Ashkenazi communities together, and established an association called Hitachadut composed of Sephardim and Ashkenazim, which would go on to appoint the Ashkenazi Rabbi Naftali Hertz Halevi to serve as the rabbi of all Jews in Jaffa. He helped establish the Sha'ar Zion Hospital in Jaffa in 1891.

Meir was committed to the revival of the Hebrew language, and together with Eliezer Ben-Yehuda, Chaim Hirschensohn, and Chaim Kalmi, he co-founded the Safa Brura ("clear language") association, which was created in 1889 to teach and encourage the use of Hebrew. He was a founding member of the Hebrew Language Committee, which was established by Ben-Yehuda in 1890 and was later succeeded by the Academy of the Hebrew Language.

In 1899, Meir was appointed deputy head of the Beth Din of Rabbi Raphael Yitzhak Yisrael. Following Elyashar's death in 1906, he was picked to succeed him as the chief rabbi of Jerusalem, but his appointment was vetoed by his opponents, supported by the Hakham Bashi in Constantinople, because of his Zionist affiliations. He was subsequently inducted as Hakham Bashi of Palestine but six months later, he was deposed by the Sultan of Turkey, and Eliyahu Moshe Panigel took charge of overseeing the Orthodox community.

== Salonica ==
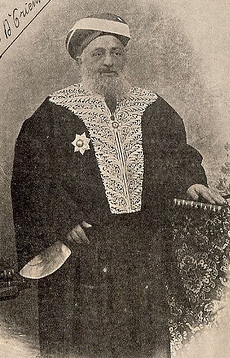
Meir as Chief Rabbi of Salonica

Meir went on to be elected chief rabbi of Salonica in 1908, where he remained until 1919. In this time, he organized young Jews to fight for the liberation of the land of Israel and encouraged their Aliyah. He was elected chief rabbi of Jerusalem in 1911, but the Jews of Salonica prevented him from assuming the office.

== Mandatory Palestine ==
In 1921, the Chief Rabbinate of Palestine was established. Meir was elected as Sephardi chief rabbi of Mandatory Palestine, and took the position, assuming the title of "Rishon le-Zion". He was at the forefront of the effort to revive Hebrew as a modern language. He held the post until his death. A letter he wrote in 1936 during the Arab revolt called an "Appeal for Friendliness" called on the Muslims of Jerusalem to halt any hatred and animosity towards Jews who were returning to their Holy Land.

Meir died on May 26, 1939, aged 83 years old. Over 10,000 Jewish residents of Jerusalem, representing all sections of the population, took part in the funeral procession.

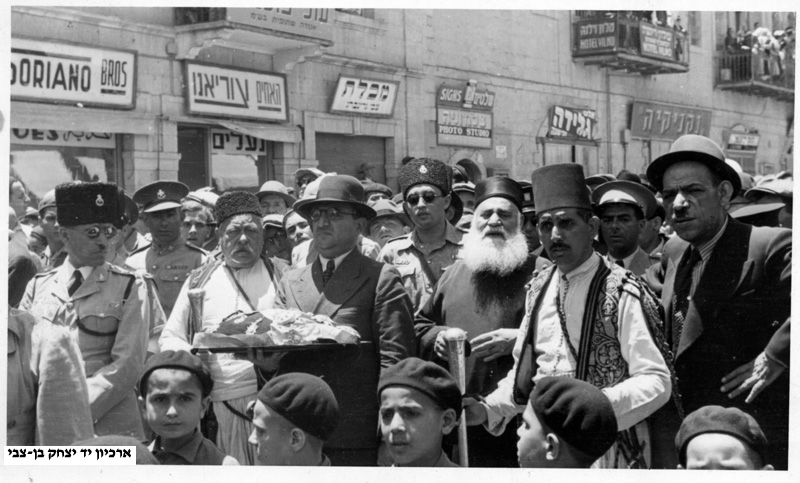
The funeral procession of Chief Rabbi Yaakov Meir on Jaffa Street, Jerusalem, May 1939.

== Honours ==
In 1920, Meir was honoured with the Commander of the Order of the British Empire award for service to the British. He was also awarded the French Legion of Honor, and received decorations from the sultan of Turkey and the Greek government, as well as Hussein bin Ali, King of Hejaz. In 2006, the Israel Postal Company issued a stamp bearing his image.

== Sources ==
- Jewish Virtual Library: Rabbi Jacob Meir
- Virtual Judaica: Protest petition on behalf of R. Jacob Meir
- Remembering Chief Rabbi Jacob Meir - On the Occasion of the 90th Anniversary of the Balfour Declaration

Jewish titles
Preceded by Yaakov Shaul Elyashar	Rishon LeZion; Yaakov Meir; 1906–1906	Succeeded by Eliyahu Moshe Panigel
Preceded by Unknown	Chief Rabbi of Salonica; Yaakov Meir; 1908–1919	Succeeded by Unknown
Preceded by New creation	Sephardi Chief Rabbi of Palestine; Yaakov Meir; 1921–1939	Succeeded by Benzion Uziel
