= Moshe Malka =

Moshe Malka (1911 – 22 March 1997) was a Moroccan-born Israeli rabbi, posek and author who served as the Sephardic chief rabbi of Petah Tikva and as a member of the Chief Rabbinate Council of Israel.

== Early life and rabbinic career ==
Malka was born in 1911 in the Atlas Mountains of Morocco to Rabbi Yehiel (Yahia) Malka, a rabbi and kabbalist. Following his father's death in 1929, he moved to Rabat, where he taught at the community's Talmud Torah, delivered classes in Talmud and Jewish law, and directed a study group known as "Petah Tikva".

In 1947, Malka became rabbi of Larache, Ksar el-Kebir and Asilah in the Spanish-controlled zone of northern Morocco. He later served as a rabbi and dayan in Beni Mellal and, beginning in 1956, as a member of the rabbinical court in Casablanca, headed by Rabbi Shalom Messas. In 1961 he became deputy president of the Casablanca rabbinical court.

== In Israel ==
Malka immigrated to Israel in 1967 and initially settled in Jerusalem. He subsequently joined the Sephardic rabbinical council in Petah Tikva and became a member of the Chief Rabbinate Council. In 1976 he was appointed Sephardic chief rabbi and head of the rabbinical courts of Petah Tikva, a position he held until his death in 1997.

== Writings ==
Malka was the author of numerous works of Jewish law, responsa and Torah commentary. His principal work was Mikveh HaMayim, a multi-volume collection of responsa covering the four sections of the Shulchan Aruch. Other works included Netifei HaMayim, Lema'an HaShabbat, VeHeshiv Moshe, Be'er Moshe and Darash Moshe.

His writings addressed a range of issues in Jewish law, including family law and conversion, as well as contemporary communal questions. His book Lema'an HaShabbat dealt extensively with the halakhic issues surrounding public demonstrations on Shabbat.

== Death and legacy ==
Malka died on 22 March 1997 and was buried at Segula Cemetery in Petah Tikva. A Torah literature prize in his name has been awarded by the Petah Tikva municipality, and a street in the city bears his name.
