= Raphael Meir Panigel =

Raphael Meir Panigel רפאל מאיר פאניז'ל
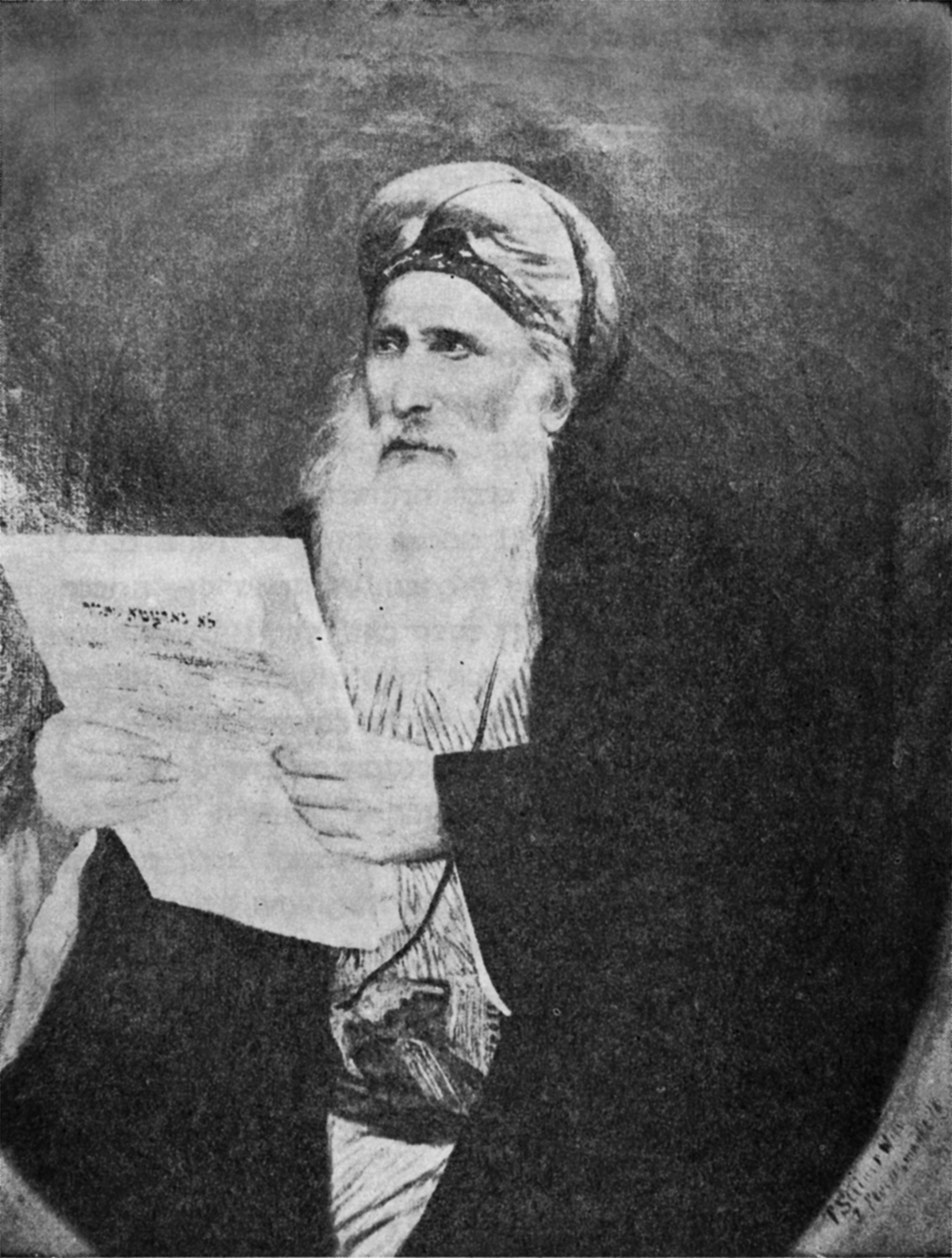
- Raphael Meir Panigel

Personal life
- Born: 1804 Pazardzhik, Ottoman Bulgaria
- Died: 2 January 1893 (aged 88–89) Jerusalem, Ottoman Empire
- Children: Vida Leah Eliashar, Yehudah Shlomo Panigel, Siniora Miriam Eliashar (biological), Yehuda Bechar, Eliahu Moshe Bechar Panigel (adoptive), possibly other

Religious life
- Religion: Judaism

Jewish leader
- Predecessor: Avraham Ashkenazi
- Successor: Yaakov Shaul Elyashar
- Position: Rishon LeZion
- Began: 1880
- Ended: 1893

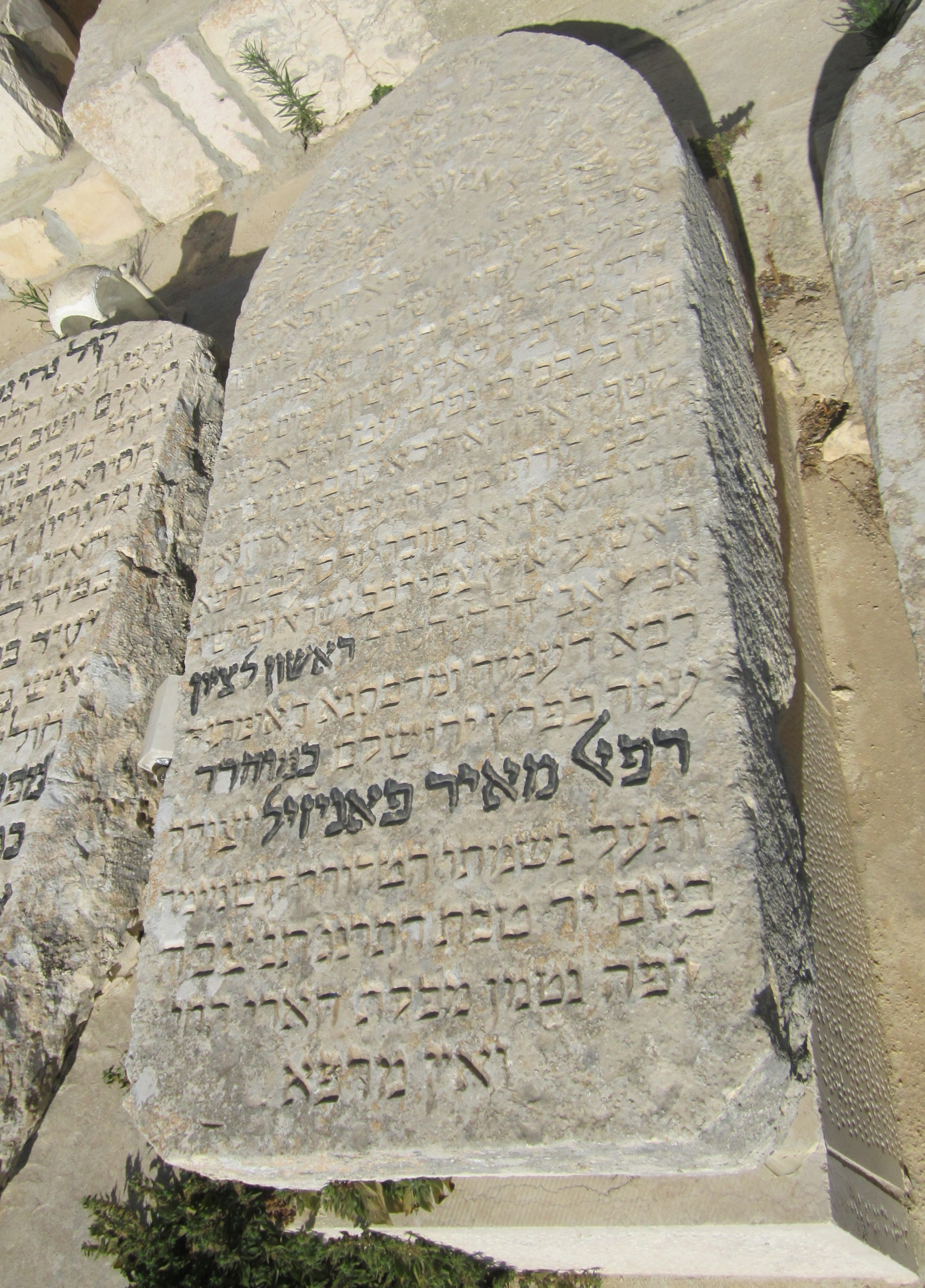
קבר הרב רפאל מאיר פאניז'ל, הראשון לציון, בהר הזיתים

Raphael Meir ben Yehuda Panigel (Hebrew: רפאל מאיר פאניז'ל; 1804–1893) was the Sephardi Chief Rabbi of Jerusalem during the reign of the Ottoman Empire.

Panigel was born in Pazardzhik, Bulgaria, but his family emigrated to the Land of Israel when he was a child. In 1828 and in 1863, he was an emissary on behalf of Jerusalem to the countries of North Africa, remaining there on both occasions for several years. In 1845 he travelled to Italy as an emissary of Hebron and was received with great respect at the Vatican by Pope Gregory XVI. In 1880 he became rishon le-Zion, and in 1890 the Ottoman authorities appointed him hacham bashi (head of the Jewish community of Palestine). He was held in great esteem by all communities and authorities. He authored Lev Marpe (1887), Talmudic novellae, responsa, and homilies. His brother-in-law, Yaakov Shaul Elyashar, later succeeded him.

Jewish titles
| Preceded by Abraham Ashkenazi | Rishon le-Zion; Raphael Meir Panigel; 1880–1892 | Succeeded by Jacob Saul Elyashar |
