= Yaakov Shaul Elyashar =

Sephardi Chief Rabbi of Palestine from 1893 to 1906

- יעקב שאול אלישר
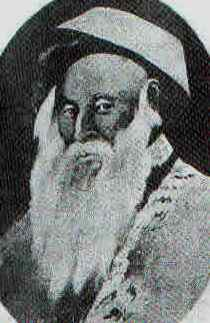
- Yaakov Shaul Elyashar

Personal life
- Born: 1 June 1817 Safed, Ottoman Empire
- Died: 21 July 1906 (aged 89) Jerusalem, Ottoman Empire

Religious life
- Religion: Judaism

Jewish leader
- Predecessor: Raphael Meir Panigel
- Successor: Yaakov Meir
- Position: Rishon LeZion, Hakham Basha
- Began: 1893
- Ended: 1906

Yaakov Shaul Elyashar (Hebrew: יעקב שאול אלישר; 1 June 1817 – 21 July 1906), also known as Yisa Berakhah, was a 19th-century Sephardi rabbi in Ottoman Syria. He became Hakham Bashi or Sephardi Chief Rabbi of the Land of Israel ( Palestine) in 1893.

== Biography and rabbinic career ==
Yaakov Shaul Elyashar was born in Safed to a prominent Sephardi rabbinical family that had resided in the Land of Israel for centuries. His father, Rabbi Eliezer Yeruham Elyashar (son of Rabbi Jacob Alyashar), was a shochet. In 1824, when Elyashar was 7, his father died. The family was thrown into poverty, and his mother sold her home and belongings and supported her only son by working as a seamstress. They moved to Jerusalem; in 1828, she married Rabbi Binyamin Mordechai Navon, who adopted Elyashar and became his teacher and mentor. By the time of his bar mitzvah, he was already considered a Torah prodigy. In 1832, at age 15, Elyashar married an orphaned girl. They had four children—three of whom were born while they were still living in his stepfather's home. In 1853, he was appointed dayan in Jerusalem and sent as the emissary of Jerusalem's Sephardic community to Alexandria. He was to persuade the Jewish community there to annul its decision to cease receiving rabbinic emissaries (meshulachim) from the Land of Israel. He was successful in persuading them to annul the decision and invited to become the city's rabbi (an offer he refused). He became the associate head of the Jerusalem beth din in 1855 and head of the beth din in 1869.

In 1893, he became the Rishon LeZion, or Sephardi Chief Rabbi of Palestine, following the death of Rishon LeZion Raphael Meir Panigel. He remained in that position for the next thirteen years until his death in 1906. Rabbi Shmuel Salant was the chief rabbi of the Ashkenazi community at the time and they enjoyed very warm relations and collaborated on various issues affecting the entire Jewish community in Palestine.

Elyashar wrote thousands of responses to questions from Ashkenazim, Sephardim, and Temanim throughout the world—most of which were published in the Questions and Responsa "Maase Ish".

== Commemoration and legacy ==
The Jerusalem neighborhood of Givat Shaul is named after Elyashar.

One of his great-grandchildren was Israeli politician and writer Eliyahu Elyashar.
