= Reshumot =

Government gazette of Israel

Reshumot (Hebrew: רשומות) is the law gazette of record for the State of Israel, in which official records and laws are published. Originally called Iton Rishmi (Official Gazette in Hebrew), its name was changed in the 1949 Transition Law to the current name - Reshumot.

Reshumot files are published by the Governmental Printer and are distributed to the government offices and to subscribers, mostly lawyers and other people with interest in official publications. In 2005 the Reshumot website was launched, and it is updated regularly ever since. The files include:

- The Book of Laws (Sefer Ha-Chukkim), in which laws that were approved by the Knesset in all three votes are published;
- Bills, in which bills that were submitted to the Knesset are published. Since 2002 this file has been split into two sub-files: Government Bills and Knesset Bills;
- File of Regulations, in which secondary legislation, such as regulations, orders and rules, is published;
- Portfolio of Notifications, in which administrative notifications are published by state institutions, according to the authorities granted by law;
- File of Regulations - Local Government Legislature
- File of Regulations - Customs, Sales Tax and Taxes Rates
- Treaties
- Patent journal
- Trademark journal

== See also ==
- Public journal
