= Meshulach =

Emissary soliciting funds for Jewish settlements in Israel

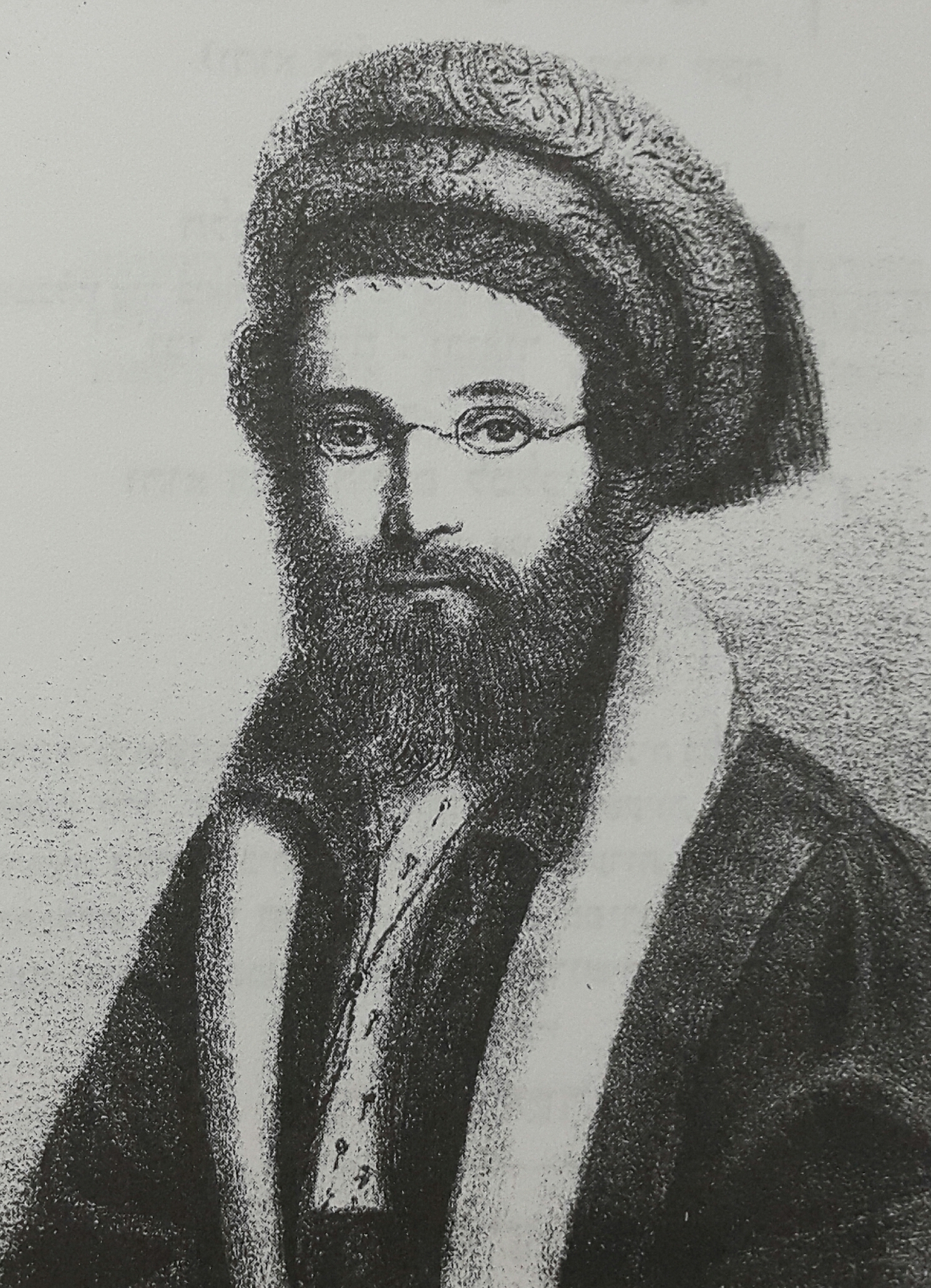
Rabbi Yosef Schwartz

A meshulach (Hebrew: מְשׁוּלָּח, romanized: meshullaḥ; plural: meshulachim), also known as a shaliach (Hebrew: שָלִיחַ, romanized: shali'aḥ) or SHaDaR (Hebrew: שַׁדָּ״ר, acronym for שְׁלוּחָא דְרַבָּנָן), (Note: SHelucha DeRabonan, an emissary of the rabbis; according to others, the acronym is SHelucha DeRachamana, an emissary from God.) was an emissary sent to the Diaspora to raise funds (ḥalukka) in order to provide for and support the Jewish communities of the Land of Israel. The institution of the Emissaries of the Land of Israel, which began in ancient times, developed and contributed greatly to the connection between Diaspora Judaism and the Jews in the Land of Israel, and to the cultural life of the Jewish communities.

== History and development ==
=== Ancient and Medieval Periods ===
The practice of sending emissaries to collect funds dates back to the time of the Patriarchate following the destruction of the Second Temple. Historically, the Diaspora would send the half-shekel Temple tax to Jerusalem to fund Temple sacrifices and communal needs, but after the destruction, the Romans attempted to convert this into a direct state tax (fiscus Judaicus). Nevertheless, the tradition of sending financial support to the Land of Israel continued, establishing a precedent for the formal role of the emissary.

In the 4th century, the system was known as the migbat ḥakhamim ("collection of scholars"). The continuation of the mission ensured the priority and influence of the leadership in the Land of Israel over Diaspora communities, notably demonstrated by the central role of the court (Beit Din) in Jerusalem in determining the Hebrew calendar. Although interrupted by the cessation of the Patriarchate in 429 CE, the practice was renewed after the Arab conquest in the 7th century, when emissaries were sent by the Palestinian Gaonate.

=== Early Modern Centralization (18th Century) ===
The institution of Sheliḥut grew significantly following the Ottoman conquest of Palestine in the sixteenth century, and missions became regular features of Jewish life to support the poor and scholars. By the mid-seventeenth century, the four holy cities—Jerusalem, Hebron, Safed, and Tiberias (after its Jewish community was reestablished around 1740)—regularly dispatched their own emissaries, representing the settlement (Yishuv) as a whole, a type of emissary known as Sheli'aḥ Kolel.

During the eighteenth century, the international fundraising network was primarily managed and overseen by Jewish communal authorities in Istanbul, known as the Pekidei Kushta (Officials of Constantinople). The Pekidei Kushta was formally established around 1726 following a financial crisis in Jerusalem, exacerbated by the underfunded immigration of a large group of Ashkenazi Jews in 1700. The Pekidei Kushta coordinated missions across defined geographical regions: "Turkey," "Europe" (Frankiya), the Maghrib, and ‘Arabistan (Middle East to South Asia). The organization played a critical role in dealing with Ottoman authorities and transferring funds from international centers like Livorno, Venice, and Amsterdam to the Holy Land.

=== Transformation and Decline ===
The immense cost of missions and the frequent complaints led to challenges to the centralized system. In 1824, a rival organization formed in Amsterdam, the Peqidim ve-Amarqalim (Officials and Administrators), led by Zvi Hirsch Lehren. They sought to centralize fundraising for Western Europe (Holland, Germany, France, England, and North America) directly, without the need for emissaries.

The spread of modern communications (newspapers, reliable postal services, and banking transfers) and improved transportation contributed to the decline of the necessity of the old, personally delivered Sheliḥut. Despite these changes, missions to the Arabic-speaking lands of the Middle East and North Africa continued well into the twentieth century. The tradition also continues in modern times for fundraising for various institutions.

== Role and functions of the emissary ==
The Shadarim were highly respected as living symbols of the continuity of the Jewish presence in the Land of Israel. Their functions extended beyond simple collection:

=== Fundraising and Compensation ===
The emissaries' core financial purpose was gathering the Halukkah. They typically sought large contributions from the community fund and solicited donations from prominent individuals (philanthropists). The work often involved great personal risk and was arduous, which was reflected in their pay. Traditionally, a successful emissary was entitled to a significant portion of the funds collected, typically one-third of the net revenue, in addition to being reimbursed for travel and having their family supported during the mission. The substantial portion of the funds used for the emissaries' travel and compensation (often 10 to 20 percent of gross revenue, or nearly half of the net revenue) often generated criticism and distrust among donors.

=== Documents and Credentials ===
Emissaries carried comprehensive documentation to authenticate their mission and secure trust:

- Iggeret Kolelet (General Letter): The most crucial document, typically written in ornate Hebrew on parchment. It contained a detailed description of the holy city's virtues and current crisis, serving both as a heartfelt appeal and formal credentials.
- Pinkas (Account Book): A record book detailing funds collected and pledged by communities and individuals. This served as evidence for the sending institution and as propaganda for upcoming stops.
- Deed of Terms (Shetar tena'ei ha-sheliḥut): A contract outlining the specific terms, expenses, and salary for the mission.

=== Spiritual and Communal Influence ===
Emissaries served as key agents connecting the Land of Israel to the Diaspora, promoting a pan-Jewish consciousness. They were typically scholars (Talmidei Ḥakhamim) or rabbis who exercised religious authority by interpreting Halakhah, settling communal disputes, and offering decisions (pesaḳ). They frequently delivered sermons in synagogues (often in Hebrew), distributed religious texts, gave approbations to local scholarly works, and personally oversaw the printing of their own or others' manuscripts while abroad. Their travels served as a major conduit for the exchange of knowledge and ideas between diverse Jewish cultures, including engaging with foreign language, science, and customs.

== Notable meshulachim ==
The historical significance of the Shadarim is emphasized by the illustrious figures who held the role:

- 1441. Esrim ve-Arba‘ah: Europe
- 1587. Joseph ben Moses Miṭrani the Elder (or di Ṭrani, 1569–1639): Egypt
- 1598–1599. Joseph ben Moses Miṭrani the Elder (or di Ṭrani, 1569–1639): Istanbul (first mission)
- 1600. Judah de Leon: Italy
- 1600s–1606. Joseph ben Moses Miṭrani the Elder (or di Ṭrani, 1569–1639): Istanbul (second mission)
- 1650. Nathan ben Reuben David Spiro: Italy and Germany
- 1659. Benjamin ha-Levi: the Levant and Italy
- 1670s. Judah Sharaf: Livorno, Italy
- 1676. Joseph ben Eliezer: Italy and Germany
- 1676. Joseph Shalit Riqueti: Italy and Germany (with the preceding, author of Iggeret Mesapperet)
- 1688–1692. Ḥezekiah ben David da Silva (1656–1697): Western Europe (including Amsterdam)
- 1690. Judah Sharaf: the Levant and Italy
- 1695. Avraham Yitzchaḳi: Italy
- 1695. Shmuel ha-Kohen: Italy, etc.
- 1695. Abraham ben Levi Conque: Italy, Germany, and Poland
- 1700. Hayyim Asael ben Benjamin: Smyrna
- 1705. Gedaliah Hayyim: Italy
- 1709. Nathan Mannheim: Germany and Poland
- 1709. Jacob of Vilna: Germany and Poland (with the preceding, author of Me’orot Natan)
- 1710. David Melammed
- 1712. Hayyim Hazzan
- 1712. Abraham Rovigo
- 1718. Hayyim Jacob ben Jacob David: the Levant and Europe
- 1720. Ephraim ben Aaron Nabon: Italy
- 1730. David Capsoto: Holland
- 1730. Moses Hagiz: the Levant and Europe for a period of 50 years
- 1740. Baruch Gad: Media and Persia
- 1740s–1749. Ḥayyim ben Elias Moda‘i
- 1750. Baruch of Austria
- 1750. Hayyim Joseph David Azulai (1724–1806): the Levant and Europe (including Egypt, Amsterdam, England, and Livorno, for 56 years. His Ma‘agal Yashar contains part of his itinerary)
- 1750. Hayyim Abraham Tzebi: Italy
- 1750. Hayyim Mordecai Tzebi: Italy, etc.
- 1750. Rahmim Nissim Mizrahi: the Levant and Italy
- 1759. Moses Malki: America
- 1760. Hayyim Nissim Jeroham of Vilna: Germany
- 1760. Yom-Ṭob al-Ghazi: the Levant and Italy
- 1760s. Ḥayyim ben Elias Moda‘i (1720–1794): Holland (wrote approbation to Pe’er ha-Dor) and elsewhere in Europe
- 1765. Jacob al-Yashar: Persia
- 1767. Issachar Abulafia: Italy (wrote approbation to Yad Mal’akhi)
- 1770. Abraham Solomon Zalmon: Europe
- 1772. Abraham Segre: Germany
- 1773. Raphael Chayyim Isaac Carregal: West Indies and the British Colonies of North America
- 1776. Jacob Raphael Saraval: Holland and England
- 1780. Judah Samuel Ashkenazi
- 1783. Abraham ha-Kohen of Lask: Germany and Poland
- 1790. David Hayyim Hazzan: Italy
- 1793. Yosef Maimon: Bukhara
- 1796. Joseph Aben Samon: Tripoli (wrote approbation to Ḥayyey Abraham)
- 1800. Israel of Shklov: Lithuania and Belarus
- 1804. Israel Raphael Segre
- 1807. Hayyim Baruch of Austria: Germany (wrote approbation to Otsar ha-Ḥayyim)
- 1810. Solomon David Hazzan: the Levant and Italy
- 1830. Joseph Edels Ashkenazi: Italy
- 1848. Isaac Kovo: Egypt
- 1848. Jacob Saphir: Southern countries (first mission)
- 1850. Isaac Farhi: Italy
- 1850. Levi Nehemias: Italy
- 1850. Joseph Schwarz: the United States (author of Ṭevu’at ha-Arets)
- 1852. Chaim Tzvi Schneerson: Damascus, Aleppo and Egypt
- 1854. Jacob Saphir: Yemen, British India, Egypt, and Australia (Second mission)
- 1856. Moses Hazzan: the Levant (author of Naḥalah le-Yisra’el)
- 1857. Chaim Tzvi Schneerson: Persia, India, China and Australia
- 1865. Raphael Meir Panigel: Europe (haham başı and author of Lev Marpe’)
- 1870. Moses Pardo: North Africa
- 1885. Moses Riwlin: Australia
- 1885. Nathan Natkin: the United States (d. 1888, in New York)
- 1890. Abraham ibn Ephraim: Persia (Sephardic)
- 1894. Yosef Haim HaCohen: Saudi Arabia, Uzbekistan and Caucasus Mountains
- 1899. Yosef Haim HaCohen: Bukhara.
- 1903. Yosef Haim HaCohen: Algiers, Constantine, Algeria
- 1934. Amram Aburbeh: Morocco.

== Bibliography ==
- Avraham Yaari - Emissaries of the Land of Israel - The History of Missions from the Land to the Diaspora, from the destruction of the Second Temple to the Nineteenth Century, Hebrew, Jerusalem (1871. Reprinted in 1977; and in 1977, in two volumes).
