= Abulafia (surname) =

Surname list

Abulafia (Arabic: أبو العافية Abū l-ʿāfiya, Abou l-Afiyya or Abu l-Afia; or Hebrew: אבולעפיה Abulafia) is a Sephardi Jewish surname whose etymological origin is in the Arabic language. The family name, like many other Hispanic-origin Sephardic Jewish surnames, originated in Spain (Hebrew Sefarad) among Spanish Jews (Sephardim), during the time when it was ruled as Al-Andalus by Arabic-speaking Moors.

The romanized version of the surname is most commonly Abolafia. Other variations also exist, mostly in English transliterations. The various spellings of the family name include Abolafia, Aboulafia, Aboulafiya, Aboulafiyya, Abouelafia, Abulafia, and Abulafiya.

It is one of only a few dozen surnames of Sephardic origin documented among Russian Jews.

== Etymology ==
Etymologically, the surname is composed of the Arabic words:

- Abu or Abou (أبو abū), literally "father" but also carrying the meaning "owner",
- al or el (الـ), or simply l if the preceding word ends with a vowel, to which it attaches itself, is the definite article equivalent to "the", and
- Afiyya or Afia (عافية ʿāfiya), literally "health, wellbeing" but also carrying the meaning "power".

Together they form Abou l-Afiyya or Abu l-Afia, rendered in Medieval Spanish as a single word, Abulafia, meaning "Father [Possessor] of good health" or "Owner [of] the Power". In actual practice, this surname was often originally rendered upon a medical doctor or pharmacist.

== History ==
The Jews of Moorish Spain were proficient in Mozarabic Spanish, Andalusian Arabic and the Andalusi variety of Hebrew. Thus, it was commonplace among Spanish Jews to use the Arabic language for secular names, including surnames, for use outside of the synagogue.

Among prominent Abulafias in Spain were the kabbalists Todros ben Joseph Abulafia and Abraham Abulafia, the powerful Toledo rabbi Meir Abulafia, the poet Todros ben Judah Halevi Abulafia, and the royal treasurer Samuel ha-Levi, for whom the Synagogue of El Tránsito was built in Toledo; it remains one of the city's most beautiful monuments.

After the Catholic Monarchs' successful Reconquista (reconquest of Spain) from the Moors in 1492, they then issued the Alhambra Decree expelling the Jews unless they converted to Catholicism; the penalty was death.

With the decree, many Abulafias, like other non-converted Sephardim, left Spain and settled mostly in the Ottoman Empire, where the Turkish Muslim Ottoman sultan offered refuge. The surname did not entirely disappear in Spain itself, and there are still Spanish Catholics named Abolafio. Those Abulafias who left in 1492 and settled as Jews in Italy often became known as Abolaffio, Bolaffio and Bolaffi.

The Abulafias – as with most other Sephardi expellees – settled mostly in the European portions of the Ottoman Empire, largely in what is today Thessaloniki, Greece and Istanbul, Turkey. This area is where the surname was most concentrated until later immigration to other parts of the Ottoman Empire, such as modern Tunisia and Rhodes. The Ottoman Empire collapsed following World War I, with Turkey becoming its successor state, and after World War II and the establishment of Israel, almost all the established Sephardic communities of the former Ottoman Empire moved to Israel, France and the United States. Today, Abulafia is a well-known Sephardic surname in Israel, and it is also present in France, the United States, Australia and Latin America.

Following the expulsion from Spain, a branch of the Abulafia family settled in what is now Israel, first in Safed, where they established a long-lasting rabbinic dynasty, and then in Tiberias, where the synagogue of Hayyim Abulafia, one of the old synagogues of Tiberias, is still the principal Sephardic synagogue, and the rabbi's tomb is a place of pilgrimage. Hayyim ben Jacob Abulafia was chief rabbi in Jerusalem in the nineteenth century and had close dealings with Moses Montefiore, a philanthropist. Palestine was also under Ottoman rule at that time. It has been claimed that some of the Abulafias who settled in the Land of Israel would later convert, adopt Arabic as their primary language and assume Arab ethnic identities, today identifying as Palestinians and Arab Israelis. Other Abulafias were closely involved in the foundation of Tel Aviv at the start of the twentieth century.

== People ==
The surname may refer to:

Historic

- Todros ben Yosef Abulafia (1225 – c. 1285) prominent Sephardic Jew
- Abraham ben Shmuel Abulafia (1240, Zaragoza, Spain – c. 1291, Comino), kabbalist
- Meir ben Todros HaLevi Abulafia (Ramah) ca. 1170 – 1244), a major 13th-century Sephardic rabbi
- Samuel ha-Levi (Samuel ben Meir Ha-Levi Abulafia) (Úbeda ca. 1320 – Seville 1360), treasurer of King Pedro I "the Cruel" of Castile and founder of the Synagogue of El Transito in Toledo, Spain
- Hayyim ben Yaaqov Abulafia (1660–1744)

Modern

- Anna Abulafia (born 1952), British scholar of religious history
- Chaim Nissim Abulafia, Tiberian rabbi
- David Abulafia (1949–2026), British historian, academic and author
- Isaac ben Moses Abulafia (1824–1910), Rabbi and halakhist
- Louis Abolafia (1941–1995), American artist and social activist
- Marilyn Sultana Aboulafia, known as Kathy Barr (1929–2008), American singer/vocalist
- Mitchell Aboulafia, American philosopher
- Richard Aboulafia, Aerospace industry analyst
- Yossi Abulafia, Award winning author

== Places ==
=== Abulafia / Abuelafia / Abouelafia ===
- Synagogue of El Tránsito, Toledo, Spain: built around 1358 for Don Samuel Abulafia, treasurer of King Pedro the Cruel, and decorated with fine stucco work and a magnificent wooden ceiling; the El Greco house nearby is thought to be on the site of Abulafia's palace.
- Etz Haim Abulafia, Tiberias, Israel: synagogue by the Sea of Galilee originally built in the eighteenth century for Rabbi Haim Abulafia as part of a program for the resettlement of Tiberias.
- Agnon House, 2 Rokach Street, Neve Tzedek, Tel Aviv–Jaffa: residence of Solomon and Rebecca Abulafia, co-founders of Tel Aviv, in which the Israeli writer Shmuel Yosef Agnon lived for a time.
- Abuelafia Bakery, established in 1879, is a prominent bakery and tourist destination in Jaffa, Tel Aviv-Yafo, owned by the Arab Israeli Aboulafia family (written both as Abuelafia and Abouelafia on the storefront signage), possibly descended from converted Sephardic Jews of the 15th century.
