= Jewish quarter of Toledo =

Human settlement in Spain

Coordinates: 39°51′23″N 4°01′47″W

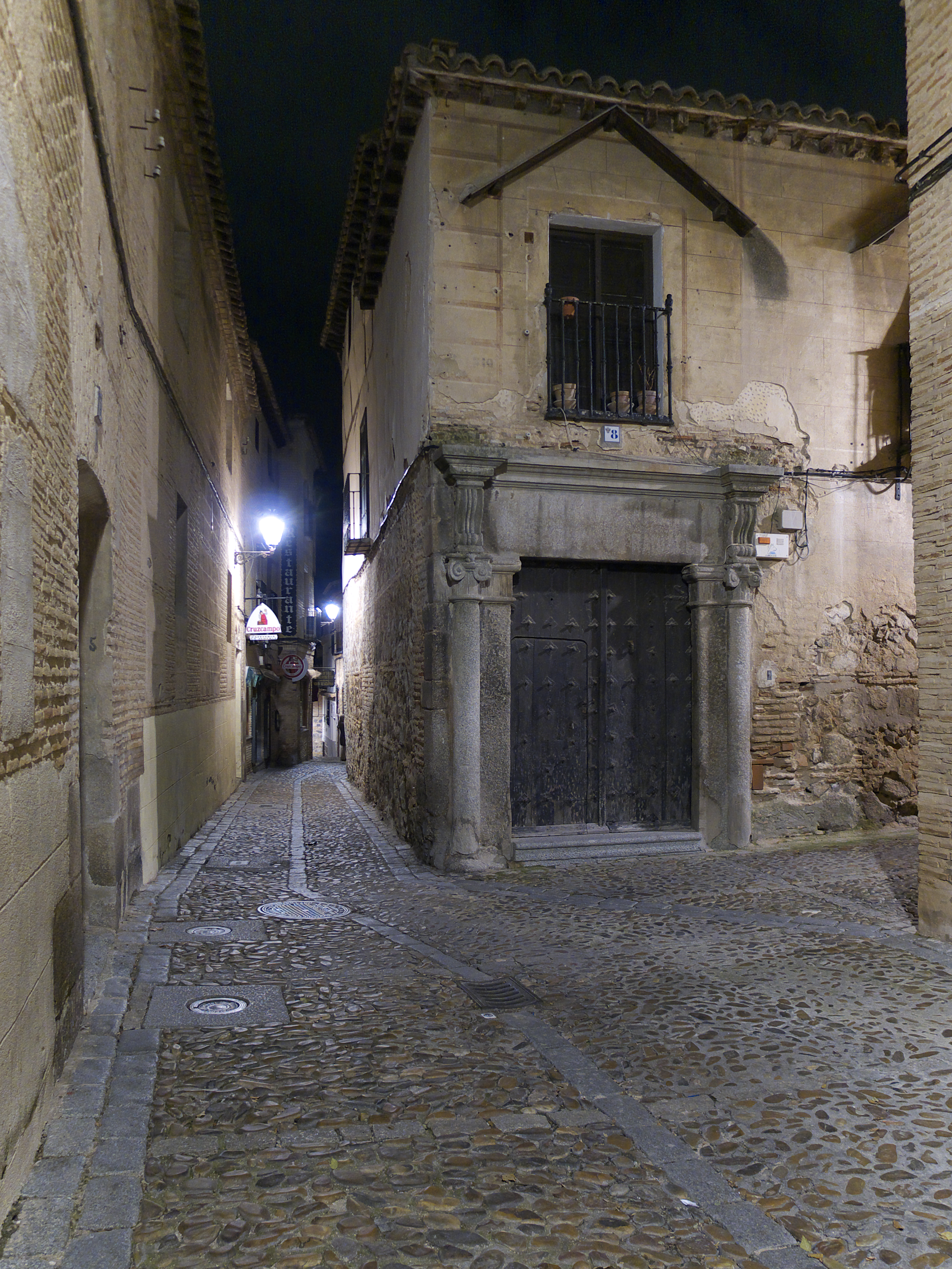
Street in the Jewish quarter of Toledo

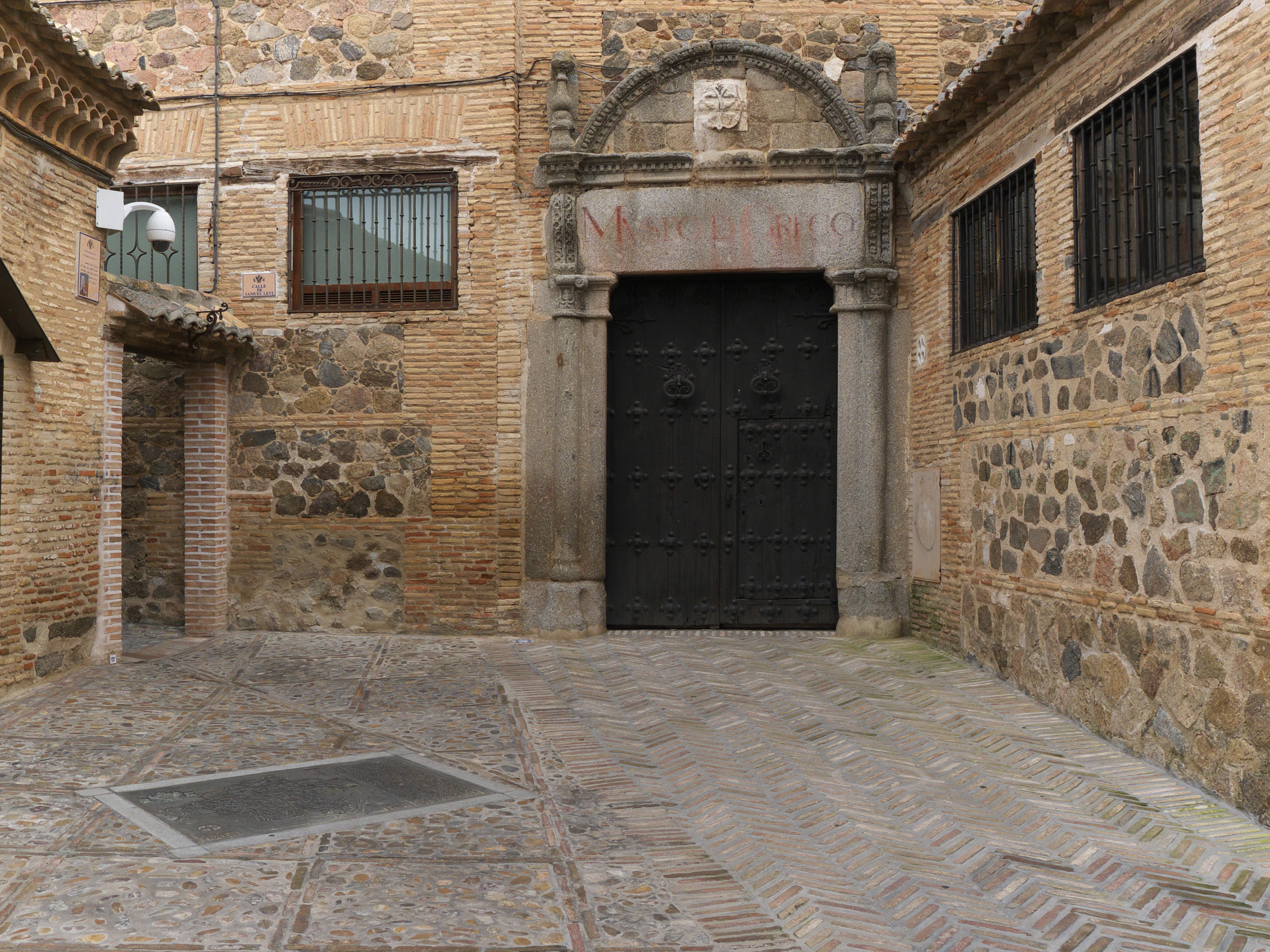
Samuel ha-Levi street

The Jewish quarter of Toledo is a district of the city of Toledo, in Castile-La Mancha, Spain. It was the neighborhood in which Jews were known to live in during the Middle Ages, though they were not mandated to live in it.

In the 12th and 13th centuries, the Jewish community of Toledo became the most populous and wealthy of the Kingdom of Castile. The Jewish community of Toledo coexisted peacefully for centuries with Muslims and Christians, giving the city the nickname “The City of the Three Cultures” (Spanish: La ciudad de las tres culturas). This arrangement, present at the time of the Siege of Toledo continued until all Jews in Spain were either expelled or forced to convert to Christianity by King Ferdinand II of Aragón and the Spanish Inquisition in 1492 under the Alhambra Decree.

== Description ==
The Jewish quarter can be reached through gates. One of the many entrances is the gate Puerta de Assulca, where there used to be a market where oil, butter, chickpeas, lentils, and everything necessary for daily life were sold.

The Jewish quarter is composed of streets, adarves (dead-end streets), and squares. The main street is Calle del Mármol which connected the Jewish quarter with the rest of the city.

During the Middle Ages, there was a market, synagogues, public baths, bread ovens, palaces, and a wall. In addition, there was a neighborhood called Barrio del Degolladero near the Tagus river, so named because here was the designated place for the ritual slaughter (shechitah) of cattle.

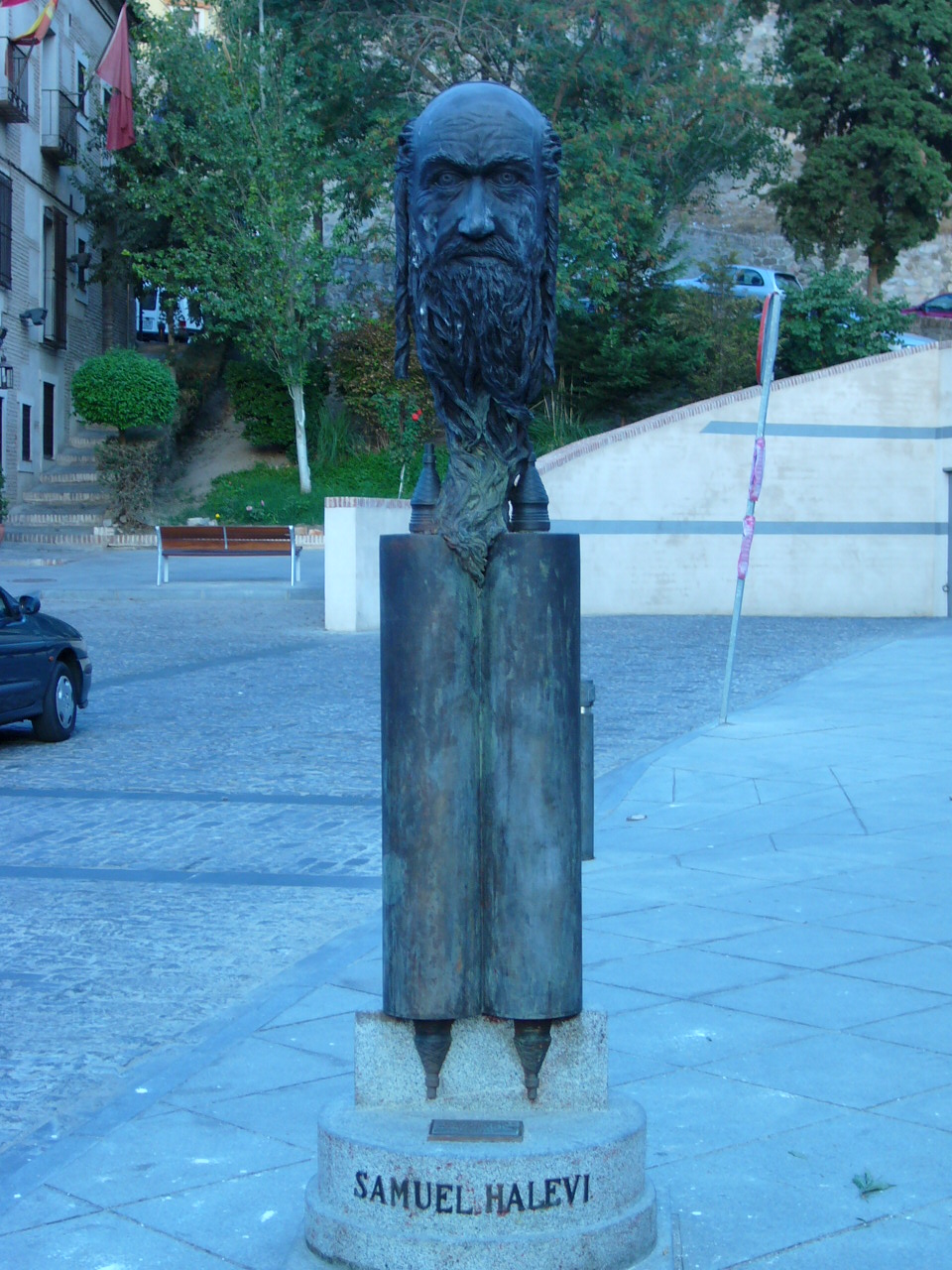
Sculpture of Samuel ha-Levi in the Jewish quarter of Toledo

In the neighborhood known as Barrio de Hamazelt, the wealthiest Jewish families lived. The most well-known Jew from Toledo, Samuel Ha-Levi, lived on the street now known as Calle San Juan de Dios. Ha-Levi was the treasurer of the king Peter of Castile and ordered the construction of the large synagogue, later was known as the Synagogue of el Tránsito. The synagogue featured a mezuzah affixed to the door-post, which contains passages from Deuteronomy.

In contemporary Toledo, two synagogues have been preserved and now function as museums: the Synagogue of el Tránsito and Santa María la Blanca (formerly the Synagogue of Ibn Shushan). When the synagogues were in use, every Friday before sunset, a rabbi would announce the arrival of the Sabbath.

Near each synagogue, there was a ritual bath called mikveh. Jewish women would use the mikveh to ritually purify themselves after menstruation and childbirth, following the traditions of family purity. The mikveh was also used to immerse specific cooking vessels, which were considered non-kosher upon purchase and required immersion in its waters before use.

== See also ==
- The Jewish House, Toledo
- Judería de Córdoba
