= Abulafia =

Abulafia may refer to:

- Abulafia (surname), or Abolafia, a Sephardic Jewish surname
- Abulafia, a fictional computer in Umberto Eco's Foucault's Pendulum
