= Synagogue of El Tránsito =

Historic synagogue used as a church, now a museum in Toledo, Spain

- Spanish: Sinagoga del Tránsito
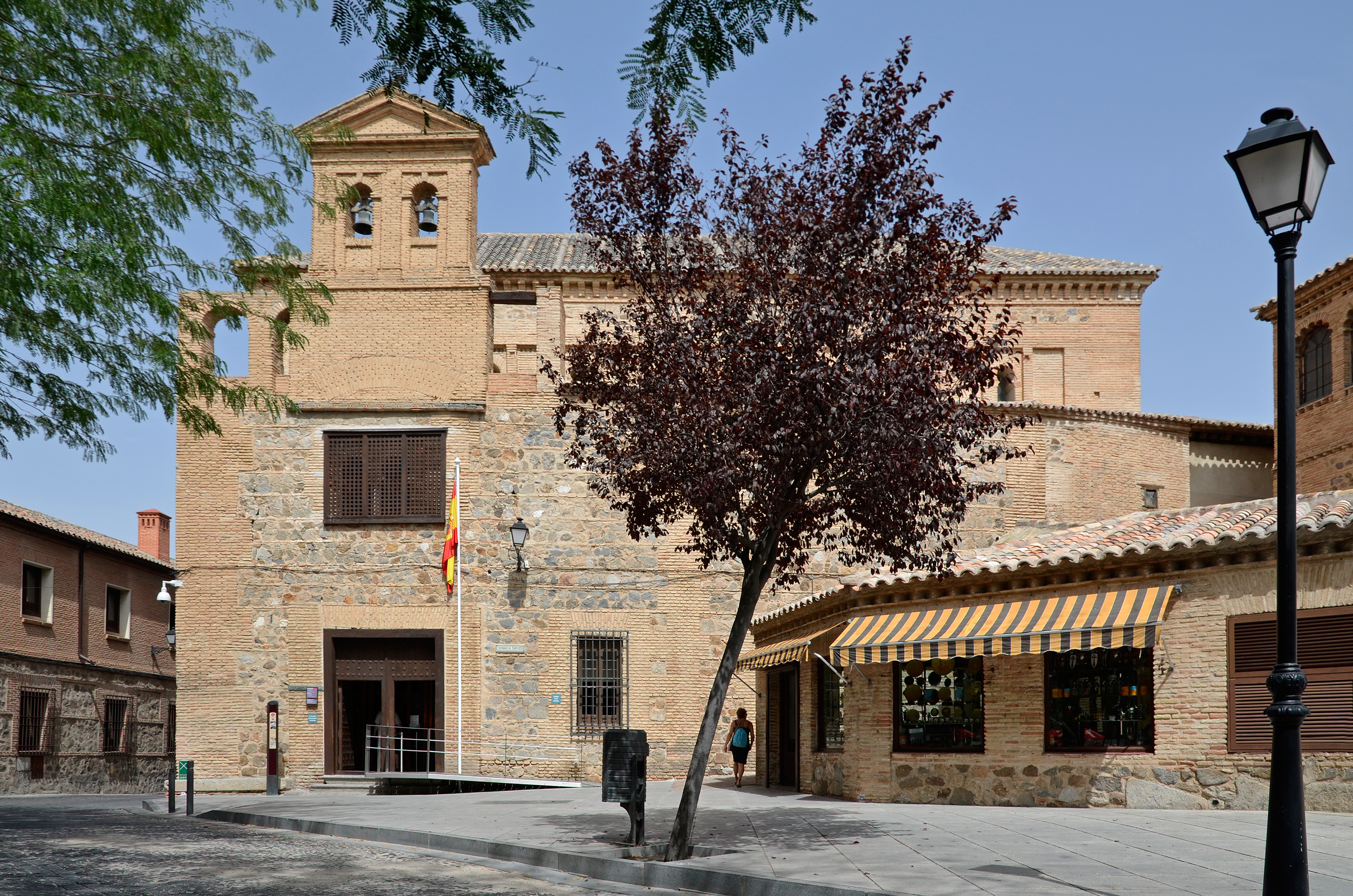
- Exterior of the former synagogue and former church, in 2012

- Location of the former synagogue and former church in Castilla-La Mancha

Religion
- Affiliation: Judaism (former); Catholicism
- Rite: Nusach Sefard
- Ecclesiastical or organizational status: Synagogue (1357–1391); Church (c. 1492–19th century); Jewish museum (since 1910)
- Status: Museum

Location
- Location: Calle Samuel Levi, Toledo, Castilla-La Mancha
- Country: Spain
- Interactive map of Synagogue of El Tránsito
- Coordinates: 39°51′21″N 4°01′46″W

Architecture
- Architect: Don Meir (Mayr) Abdeil
- Type: Synagogue architecture
- Style: Mudéjar/Moorish
- Founder: Samuel HaLevi Abulafia
- Established: c. 1350s (as a congregation)
- Completed: 1357 (as a synagogue); 1556 (as a church)
- Materials: Stone

Spanish Cultural Heritage
- Official name: Edificio Denominado Sinagoga del Tránsito
- Type: Monumento
- Designated: 1877
- Reference no.: RI-51-0000017

The Synagogue of El Tránsito (Spanish: Sinagoga del Tránsito), also known as the Synagogue of Samuel ha-Levi or Halevi, is a former Jewish congregation and synagogue, located at on Calle Samuel Levi, in the historic old city of Toledo, in the province of Castilla-La Mancha, Spain.

Designed by master mason Don Meir (Mayr) Abdeil, it was built in 1357 in the Mudéjar or Moorish style as an annex of the palace of Samuel HaLevi, treasurer to King Peter of Castile. The synagogue is located in the former Jewish quarter of the city between the Monastery of San Juan de los Reyes and the Synagogue of Santa María la Blanca. It is one of three preserved synagogues constructed by Jews under the rule of the Christian Kingdom of Castile.

The building was converted to a Catholic church after the Expulsion of the Jews from Spain in 1492. It was briefly used as military barracks during the Napoleonic Wars of the early 1800s. It became a Sephardic Jewish museum in 1910, formally known today as the Sephardic Museum.

The building has been added to the list of monuments of Spanish Cultural Heritage (Spanish: Bien de Interés Cultural). It is also known for its rich stucco decoration, Mudéjar style, and women's gallery.

== History ==
=== Synagogue ===
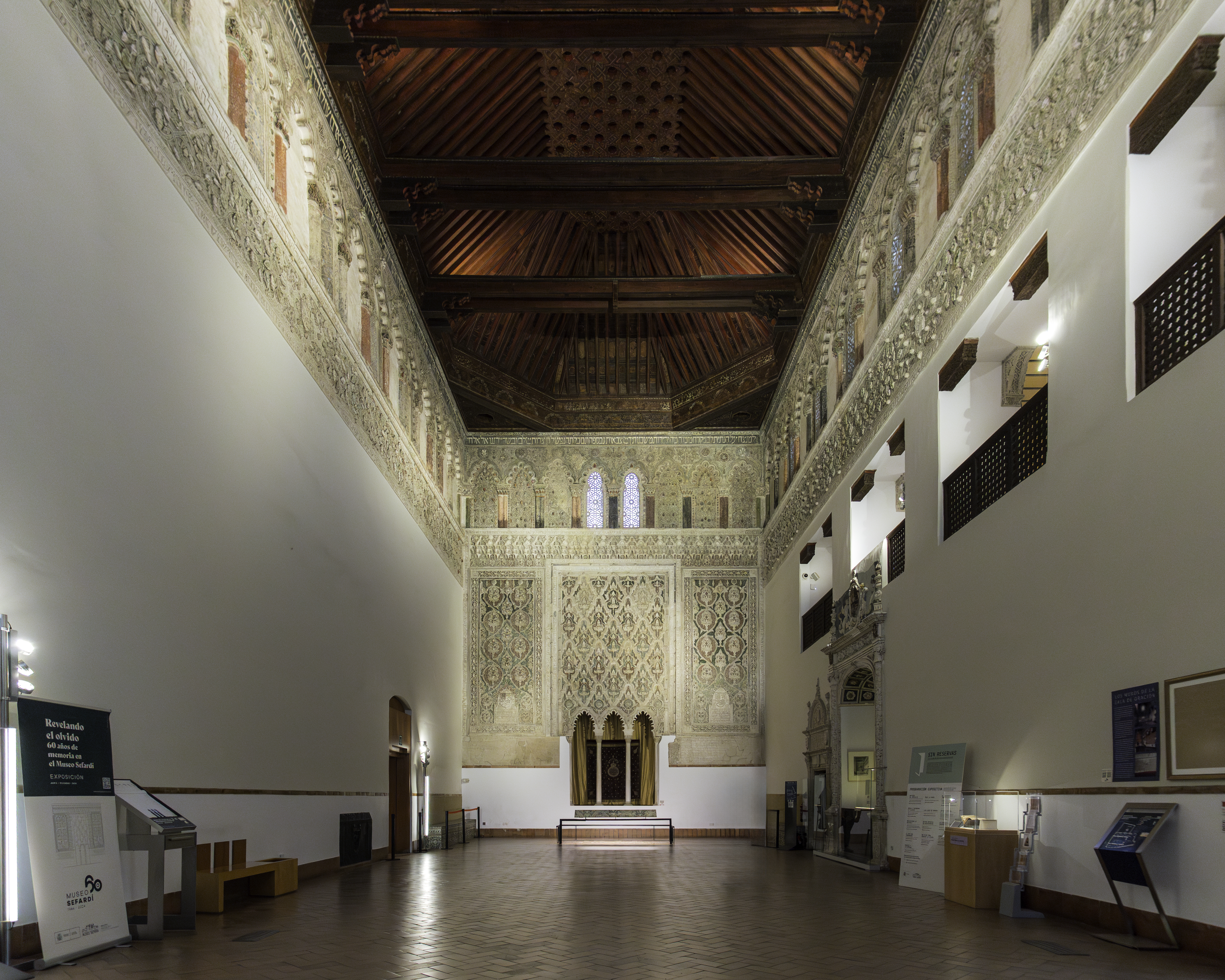
Interior overview of the praying hall

The synagogue was built around 1357, under the patronage of Samuel HaLevi, who was an Abulafia. His family had served the ruling Castilian House of Burgundy for several generations and included kabbalists and Torah scholars such as Meir and Todros ben Joseph Abulafia. Another Todros Abulafia,Todros ben Judah Halevi Abulafia, was one of the last poets to write in the Arab-influenced style favored by Jewish poets in twelfth and thirteenth-century Spain.

Located within Toledo's medieval Jewish quarter, the synagogue is connected to Samuel Abulafia's house by a gate and was intended as a private house of worship. It also served as a center for Jewish religious education or yeshiva.

Some scholars suggest that Peter of Castile assented to the synagogue's construction as a token of appreciation for Samuel’s service as counselor and treasurer to the king. Peter may also have allowed it to compensate the Jews of Toledo for the persecution of Jews during the Black Death in 1348.

Throughout the 14th century, Spanish Regional Councils had sparked a prohibition on constructing synagogues. As to why the construction of this synagogue would have been allowed remains debated, but scholars reason that it was due to Samuel's relationship with King Peter of Castile, or the fact that it was a private home. It may also be that limitations did not apply in Castile to synagogues built in private houses, which was a common way to pass the ban on creating new synagogues in both Christian and Muslim areas. Construction would often be allowed after payment of a fee or bribe. More recent evidence also suggests that the synagogue was built over an older synagogue, thus forming a loophole in the ban since this was perhaps not viewed as a new construction.

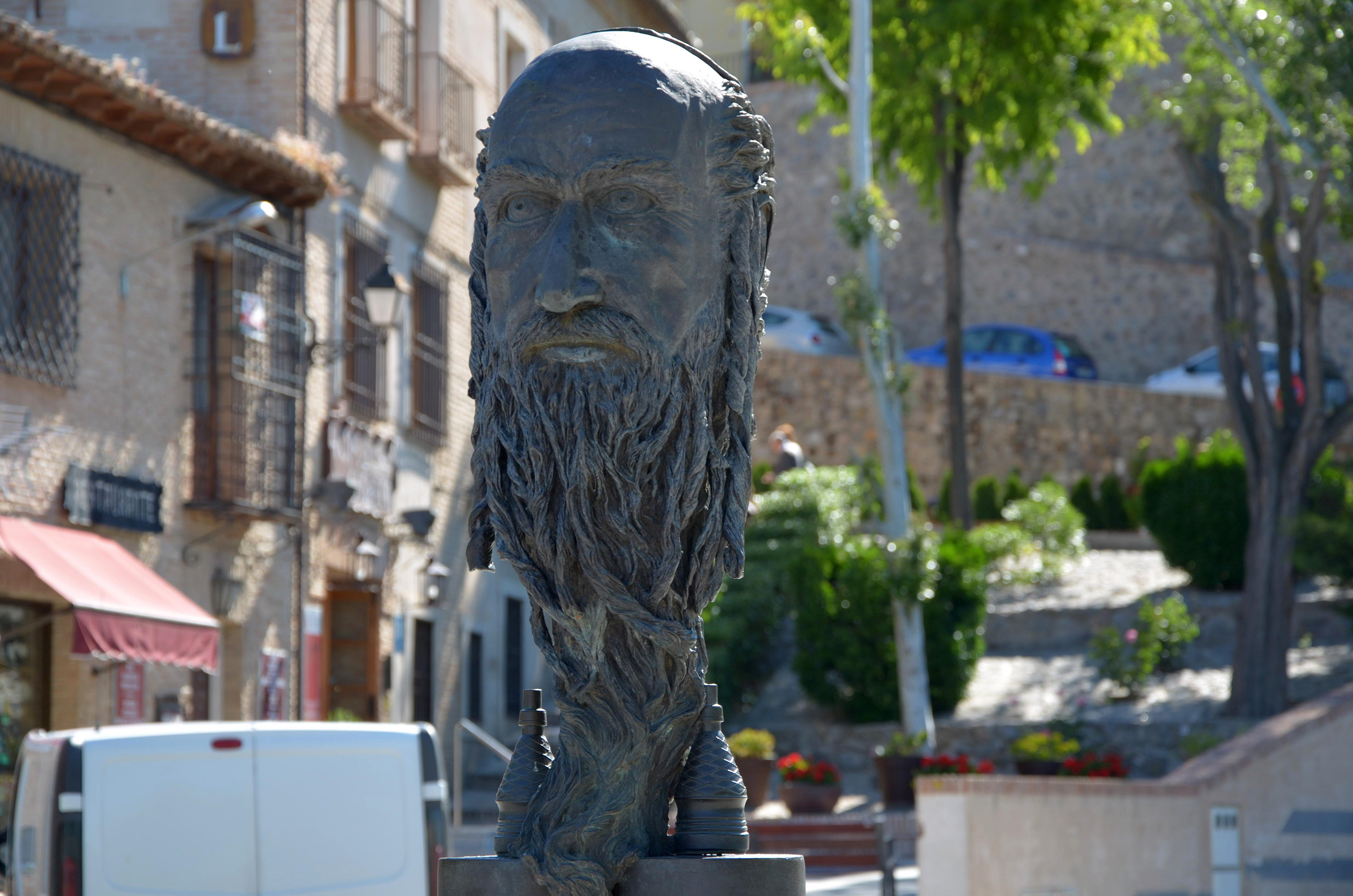
Bust of Samuel ha-Levi

Samuel eventually fell out of favor with the king. He was arrested in December 1360 on corruption charges, imprisoned in Seville, and tortured to death.

During the anti-Jewish Massacre of 1391, the Jewish quarter of Toledo was attacked, but the synagogue was saved.

=== Church ===
After the expulsion of Jews from Spain in 1492, the synagogue was converted to a church. It was given to the Order of Calatrava by King Ferdinand and Queen Isabella of Spain. The Order is said to have converted the building into a church serving a priory dedicated to Saint Benedict. It was from its time as a church that the building acquired the name "El Tránsito", which refers to the Assumption of the Virgin Mary. In the 17th century the church's name changed to Nuestra Señora del Tránsito: the name derives from a painting by Juan Correa de Vivar housed there which depicted the Transit of the Virgin.

=== Military barracks ===
The synagogue was used as military headquarters during the Napoleonic Wars.

=== National monument and museum ===
In 1877 the building became a national monument. The transformation of the building into the Sephardi Museum, as it is now called, started around 1910. It was initiated by the Vega-Inclan Foundation. In 1964, a royal decree established the Museo Sefardi, located in the Synagogue of Samuel ha-Levi. Four years later, in 1968, it was renamed the National Museum for Hispanic-Hebraic Art. The building, which is in a good state of conservation, remains a museum.

=== Restorations ===
After its conversion to a parish church and use as a barracks, the building underwent several periods of restoration. The first phase began in 1879 with the cleaning and repair of the Torah ark, the restoration of at least fourteen lattices, and the removal of various Hebrew inscriptions. In 1884, Arturo Mélida y Alinari replaced Francisco Isidori as the head architect of the project, focusing mainly on the roof, façade, and reinforcements. The building fell back into disrepair before it became part of the El Greco Museum in 1911, when a new large-scale phase of restorations began. Scaffolding that had been put up in previous decades and partitions from the women's gallery were removed. The wooden church choir and portions of the interior were restored. Adding a library to the lower part of the gallery, which has since become an important center for Hebrew studies, entailed the demolition of large portions of the façade.

== Architecture ==
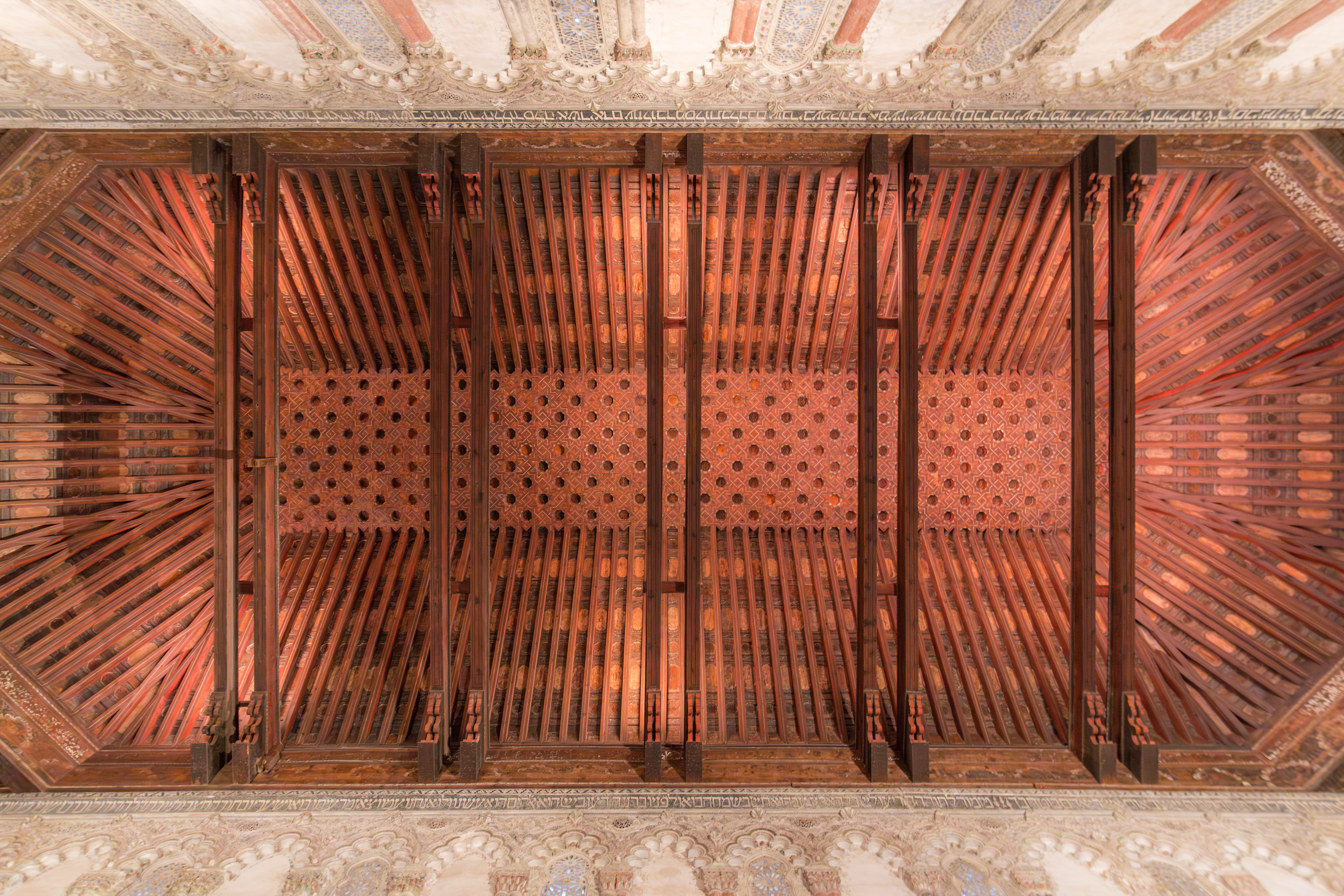
Wooden artesonado

With the apparent approval of the king, Samuel defied the laws that required synagogues to be smaller and lower than churches and plain when it came to decoration. The prayer hall is rectangular and measures 23 × 9.5 meters (roughly 75.5 feet × 29.5 feet), has a 12-meter-high ceiling (close to 40 feet) and features Nasrid-style polychrome stucco, multi-foil arches, and a massive Mudéjar artesonado ceiling. It also has Hebrew inscriptions praising the king and Samuel and Arabic inscriptions and quotations from Psalms. There were also Christian elements in the architecture that mixed muqarnas ornament with heraldry and vegetal motifs that were common in Christian and Islamic buildings, as well as in synagogues of the time. The ornamentation also bears the haLevi coat of arms, borrowing Christian architectural customs. Arabic inscriptions surround the prayer room and are intertwined with the floral patterns in the stucco. They are in Kufic-style script and include positive devotional affirmations and praises of God common in Islamic architecture. All along the prayer hall are large larchwood frames made with inlaid carved polychrome of ivory. The original floor, which only some parts have been preserved, was covered in mosaics. It is illuminated by many windows.

Women were separated from men during services; a second-floor gallery was reserved for them. The gallery is located along the southern wall, having five broad openings looking down towards the ark of the Torah, called the hekhal by Sefardic Jews. The hekhal developed a design innovation in the form of a great façade that had three vertical panels with a sebka motif in the center panel as well as muqarnas cornices with vegetal and garden motifs.

The architecture of El Tránsito influenced other 14th-century synagogues, like the Córdoba Synagogue, which shared the three-panel façade hechal design and Mudéjar architecture.

In contrast with the highly ornamented interior, the synagogue's exterior was built of brick and stone and was plain and largely unadorned. The mixed stone and brick exterior walls are simple, with an aljima window (a pair of horseshoe arches) over the entry door. This left the synagogue an unassuming building that did not stand out from its surroundings except its tall roof elevated it slightly above the adjacent buildings.

The eastern wall received the most extensive ornamentation. It is divided into six pieces and is made of cedar wood. Its top half is decorated with septifoil arches, while the centrepiece is patterned with arabesques. It is thought that Samuel imported the wood from Lebanon to imitate King Solomon.

=== Mudéjar ===
El Tránsito Synagogue is a significant example of medieval Spain's mudéjar, or Islamic-inspired, style of art and architecture. Its façade was and remains a prime example of mudéjar architecture in al-Andalus which symbolizes the social status, power, and influence of Samuel ha-Levi. Ha-Levi often interacted with the Nasrid dynasty's court in Granada at the palace of the Alhambra and very likely spoke Arabic. Because of this, it is believed he was inspired by the architecture and emulated it for the synagogue.

Around the same time as the construction of the synagogue and the Alhambra by Muhammad V, Peter of Castile restored the Alcazar of Sevilla, a historic Almohad fortification with Nasrid architectural and mudéjar design elements. Muhammad V and Peter of Castile were allies on occasion. They are thought to have shared their architects and artisans to build the most opulent and luxurious palaces. As the king's treasurer, ha-Levi traveled between Seville, Granada, and Toledo while the synagogue was in construction. He also negotiated with the king's contractors and architects over construction expenses. As a result, he must have benefited from the same architects, masons, and design and architectural ideas.

Islam architecture and aesthetic mixed with the Castilian coat of arms are significant in that it indicates a connivance from Ha-Levi towards the dominating religions. The fact that Samuel was entrusted with the use of the Castile seal indicates his power and reliability with Peter of Castile and his reign.

=== Hebrew and Arabic Inscriptions ===
The Arabic inscriptions in the Synagogue are decorative, though legible, and are not affiliated with the Quran. They are placed away from the Eastern wall (the Synagogue's focal point) and higher up, they were also meant as a good sign of interfaith. For example one of these reads: Bi'l ni'mah wa-bi'l quwah wa bo'l karamah, roughly translated, "by (or in) grace, power, magnanimity (or, alternatively, generosity or happiness), salvation".

The Hebrew inscriptions, however, draw from Psalms. It mentions Ariel, a reference to Jerusalem. The Hebrew inscriptions surrounding the coat of arms, reads as follows in English:

"Of the graces of the Lord let us sing and of the works of the Lord according to what he has bestowed on us and hath done great things with us...instituting judges and ministers to save his people from the hand of Enemies and oppressors
And there is no King in Israel, he hath not left us without a Redeemer
He is the bulwark tower, which since the day of the exile of Ariel None like him has risen in Israel
For the Name and the glory and the praise
Known is his name in Israel since the day he dwelt on his land and stood before Kings
To him who stands in the breach
And seeks the good of his people
Head of the exile of Ariel,
The select of the leaders.

The crown and the great man of the Jews
To him peoples come from the ends of the Earth
....He is the ruler of the land
The great tamarisk
Fort of strength and greatness
He ascended in the degrees of greatness in accordance with his praise, and great and holy
Will he be called
The right pillar upon which the House of the Levite (Halevi) and the House of Israel are set
And who can count his praises?
His virtues and his deeds
Who can recount
And who will attain to complete praise
Diadem of rule Prestige of Dignity
He stands at the head of the order
Exalted among the exalted of the Levites of God Samuel Ha-Levy
The man raised on high
May God be with him and let him go up
He found grace and
Favor in the eyes of the great eagle, the great one, the man of war and the man of the middle
The fear of whom has fallen on all peoples
Great is his name among the nations
The great King, our shelter and our lord the King Don Pedro
May God aid him,
And increase His might and his glory
And guard him as the shepherd of his flock
The King has made Him great and exalted him
And raised his throne above all the ministers....
And without him shall no man lift up his hand or his foot
And the nobles bowed themselves to him with their face to the ground....
Through all the land is he known among
The peoples heard
His fame has been heard through all the kingdoms,
And he has been to Israel as a savior."

Also on the Eastern wall, above the blind arches, is a foundational plaque dedicated to Samuel HaLevi. Due to its deteriorating state, the exact date is not clear; however, scholars are able to determine the year by using Hebrew words that double as numbers in the language. In the plaque, the Hebrew letters טוב ליהודים that when added together amount to 5122 using the Hebrew calendar, the equivalent to 1357 in the Gregorian calendar.

The exalted pious prince of princes of Levi … has exceeded in all deeds by building a house of prayer for the Lord God of Israel … and he commenced building this house in the year (1357)

Below the Coat of arms of Castile and León lies yet another Hebrew inscription, expressing admiration for the beauty of the synagogue. It references Bezalel and the biblical story in which he is chosen to build the Tabernacle, creating an allusion to haLevi himself:

And its atriums for those attentive to the perfect Law/and its seated places for those who sit in His shadow/of such a type that those who see it must almost say: The design of this [temple]/ is like the design of the work by Bezalel/Walk, nations, and enter through its doors/And look for God, since like the house of God it is, like Bethel"

In the prayer room, on top of the four walls the ceiling, just below the ceiling we find the following inscription:

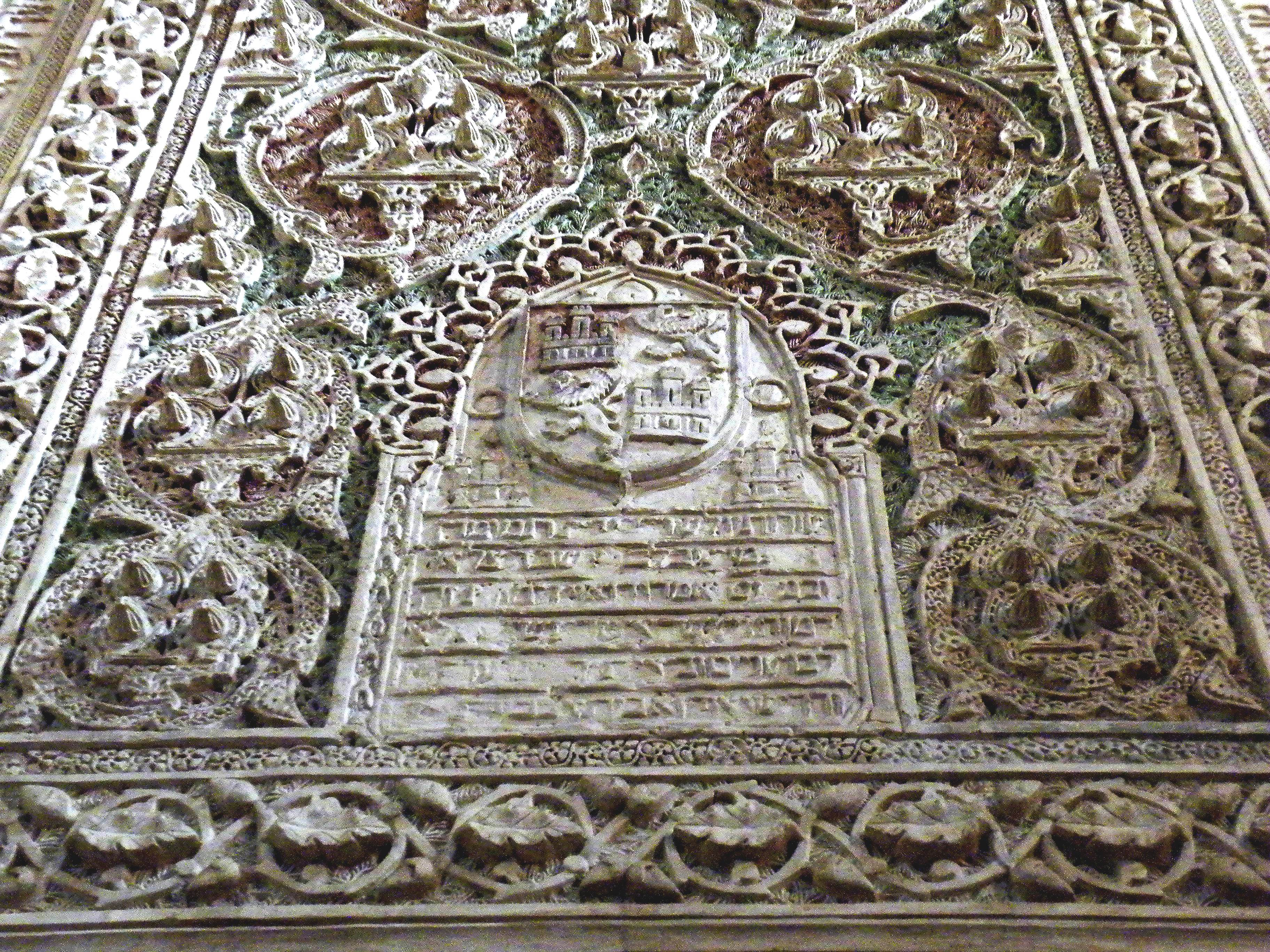
Inscription surrounding the Castile and Leon coat of arms

"See the sanctuary now consecrated in Israel
And the house which was built by Samuel with a pulpit of wood for reading the law
With its scrolls and its crowns all for God
And its lavers and lamps to illuminate
And its windows like the windows of Ariel"

Some experts believe the inscriptions also refer to another renowned Samuel, a Levite named Samuel ibn Naghrela (993–1056), a significant Jewish leader throughout the Middle Ages, both Samuels were proud of their Levitic ancestry.

=== Motifs ===
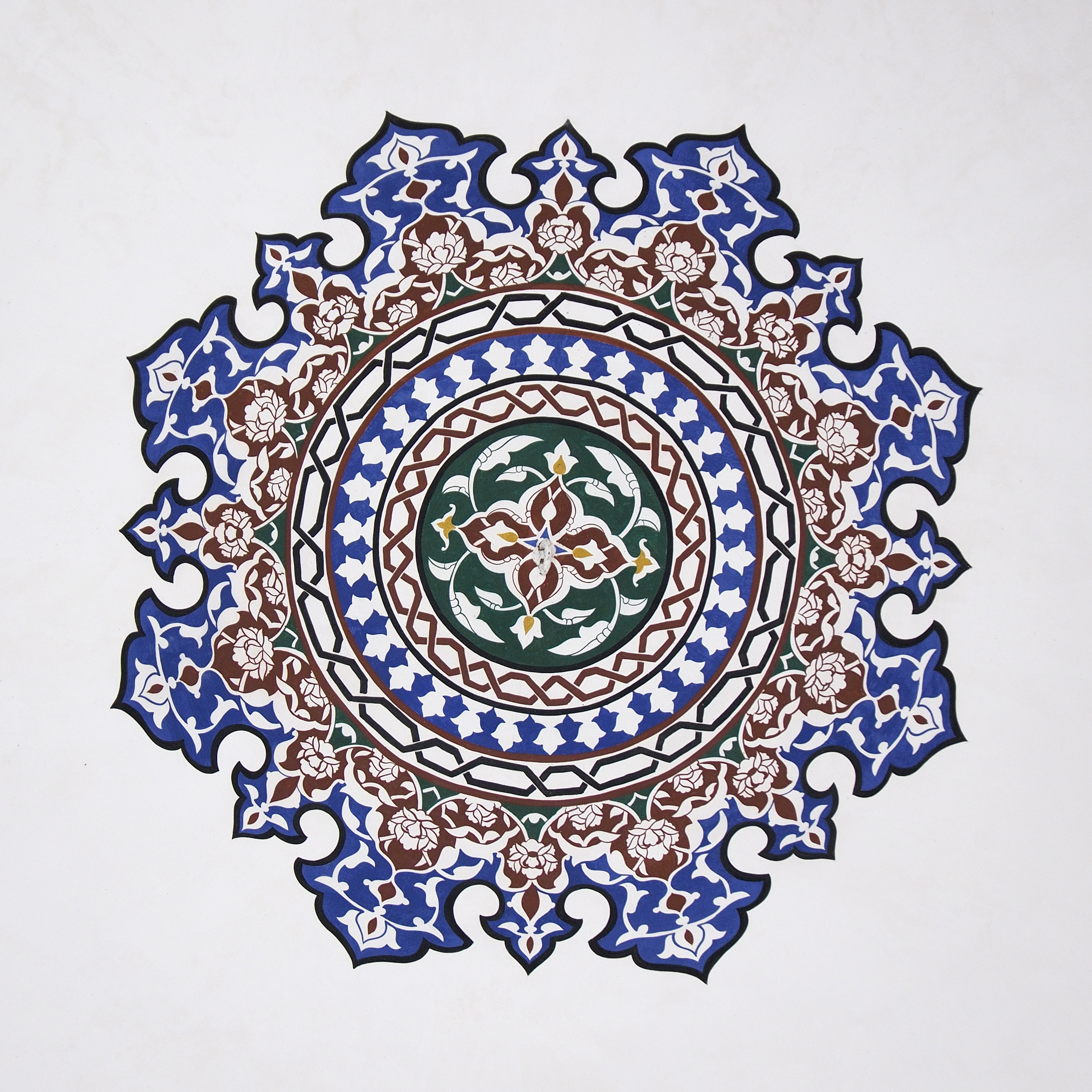
Islamic vegetal patterns, Gazi Hajdar Kadi Mosque

The starry sky that decorates the frieze of the synagogue represents the idea of heaven. Meanwhile, the floor, which contains vegetal patterns, signifies the Earth. This is important, as it represents the separation of heaven and Earth and its relation to Jerusalem. According to Jewish belief, Jerusalem, being situated on the highest place on the planet, serves as an in-between for heaven and Earth, and is, by consequence, the place closest to heaven. In the synagogue, there is a stucco carving within the clerestory, as well as towards the bottom of the wall a representation of Jerusalem. This symbolic reference to Jerusalem comes from the Genesis creation narrative. The symbolic placement of stucco mixed with the inscriptions (discussed above) is reminiscent of the Alhambra since Samuel intended that the spectator could read the architecture and art like a book, as is seen in alcázares and mosques in al-Andalus.

== Gallery ==
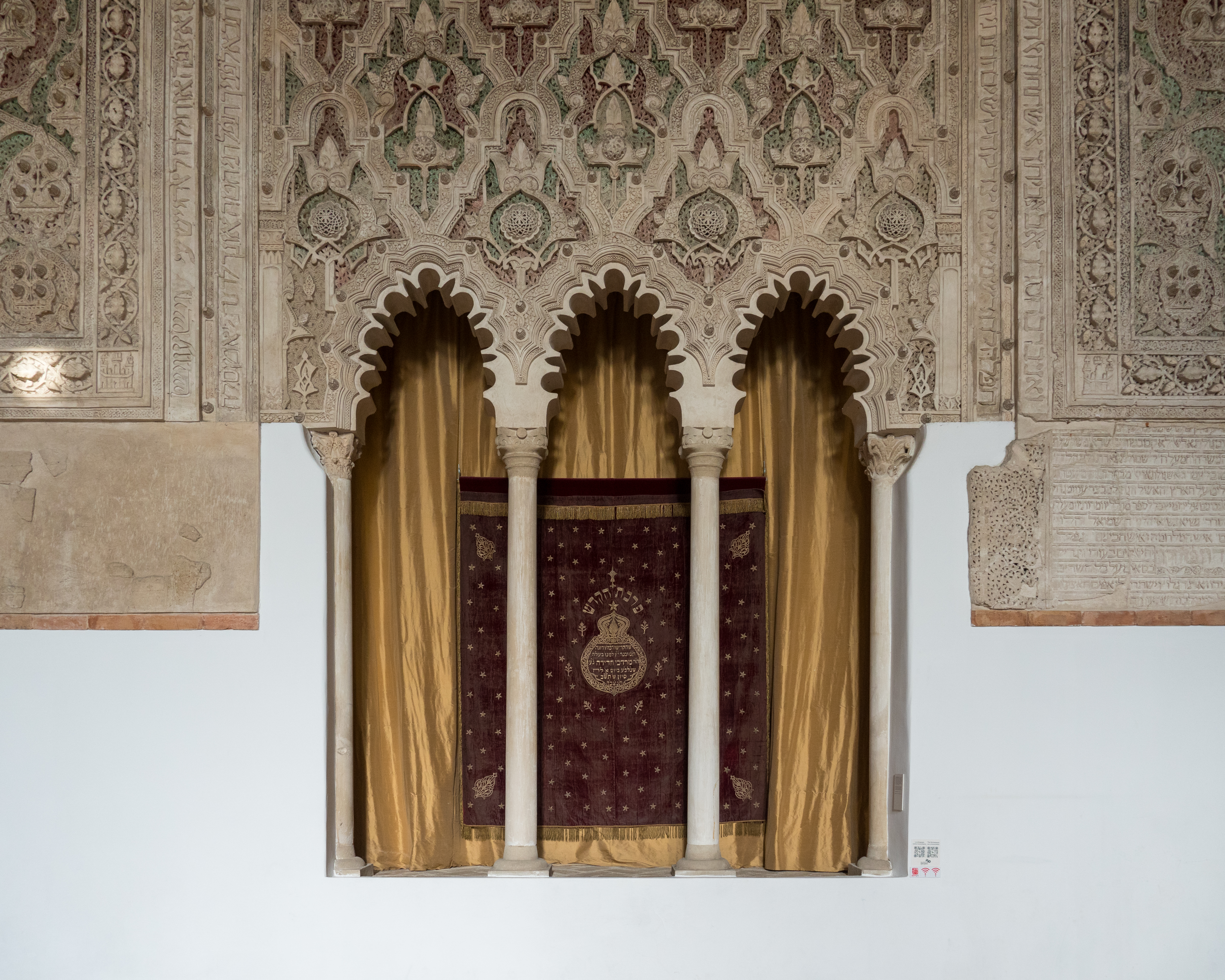
Holy ark

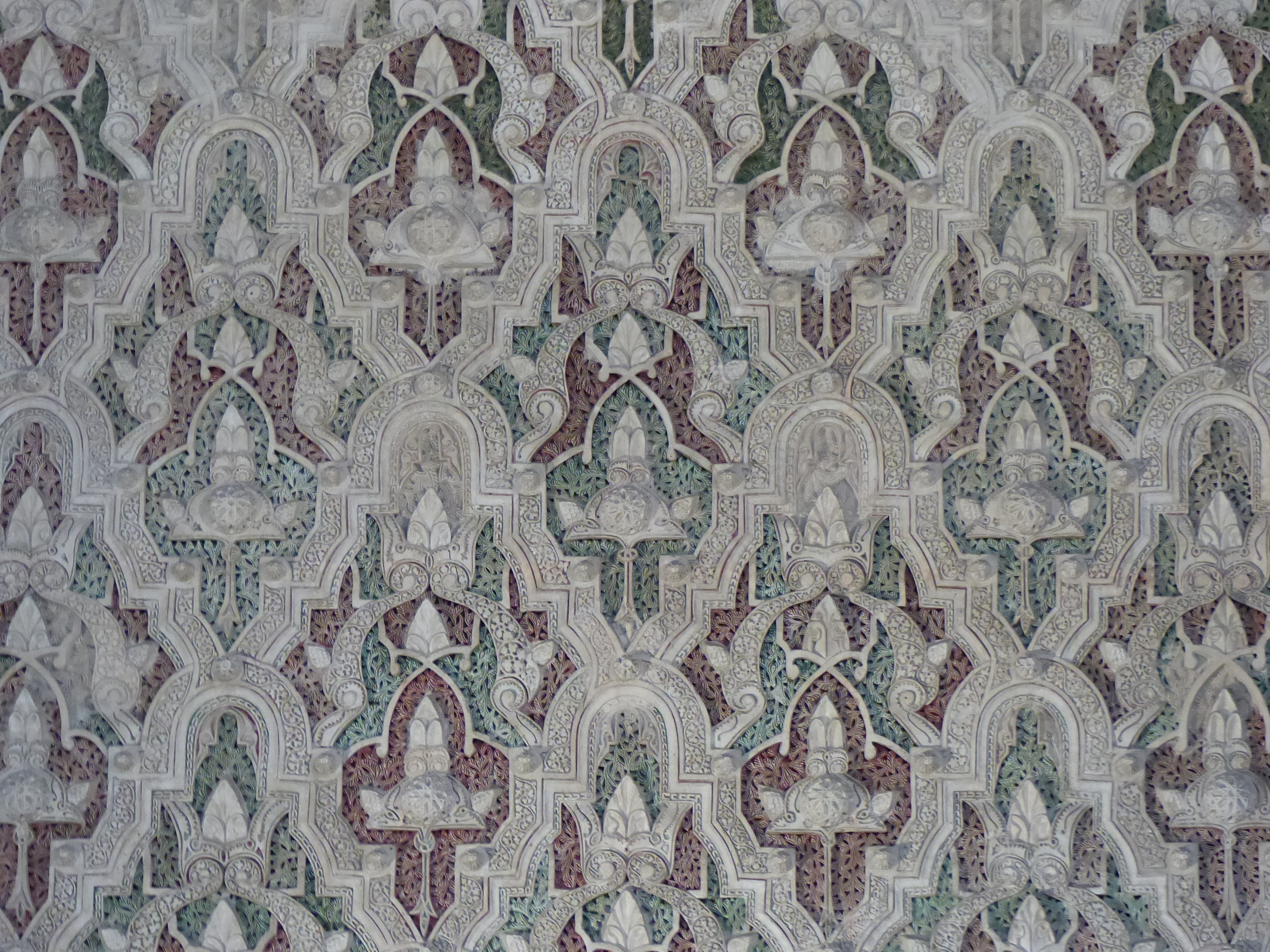
Detail of relief on ark

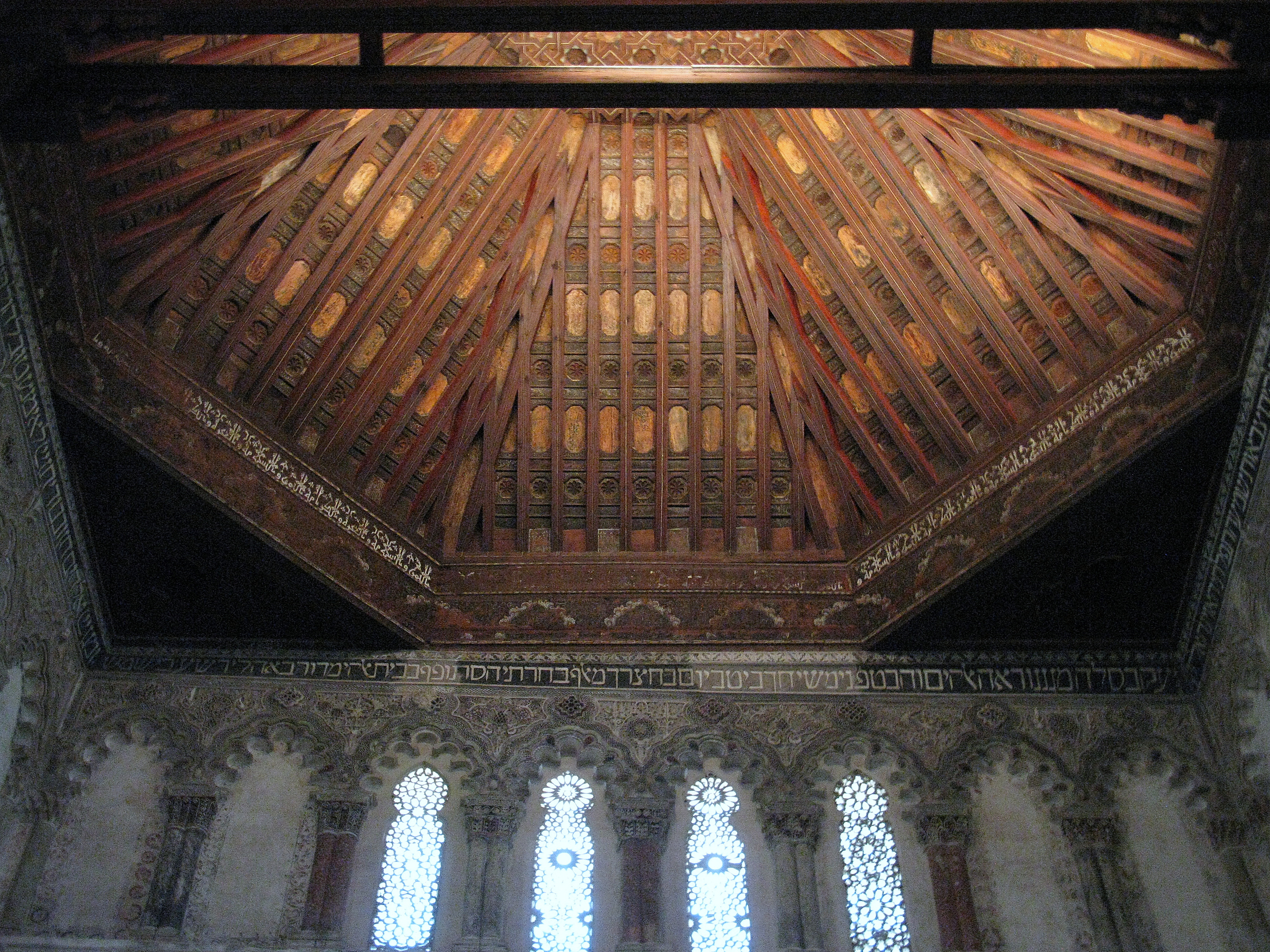
The building's wooden artesonado ceiling

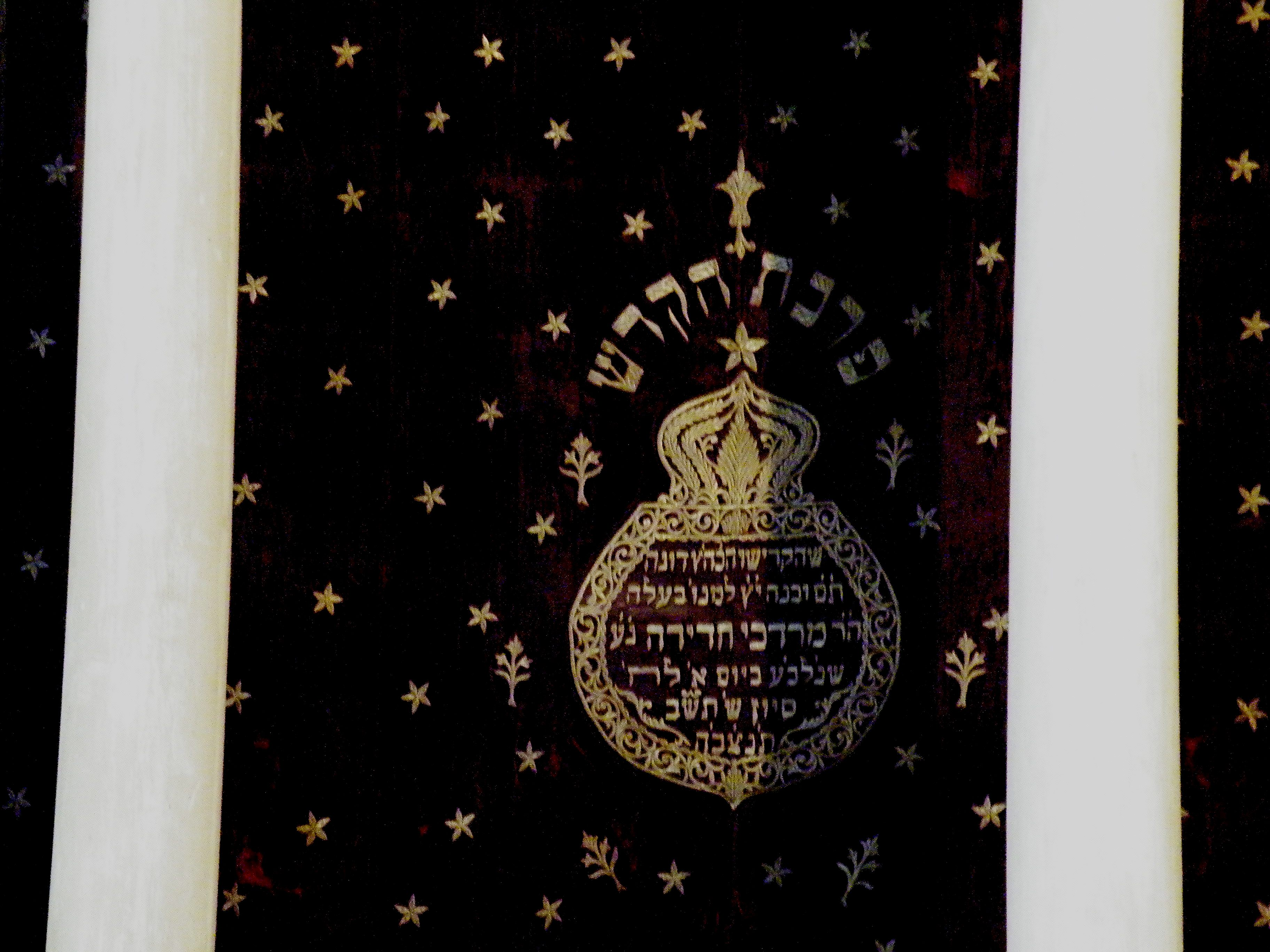
Torah ark cover

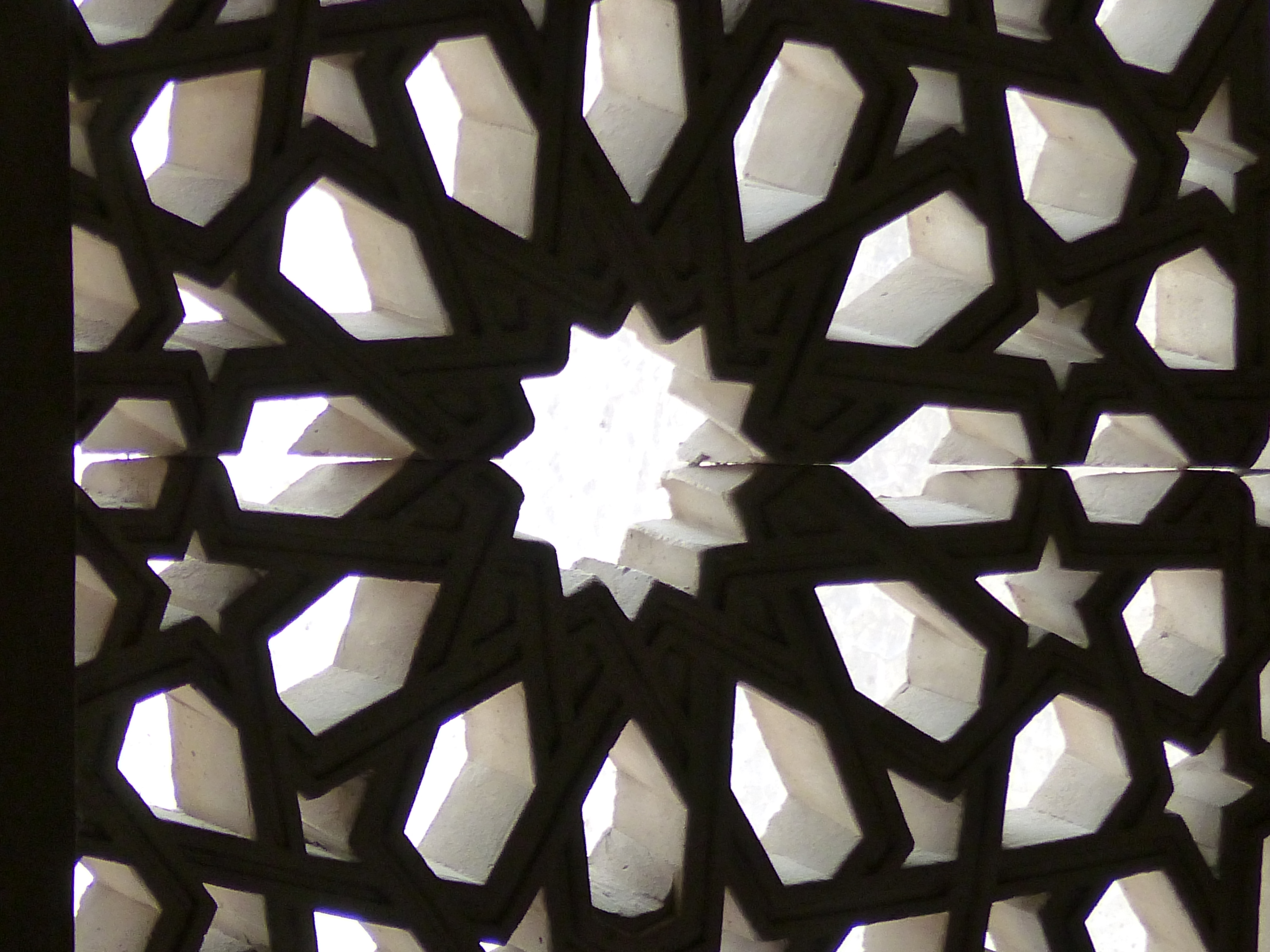
Detail of the building's windows

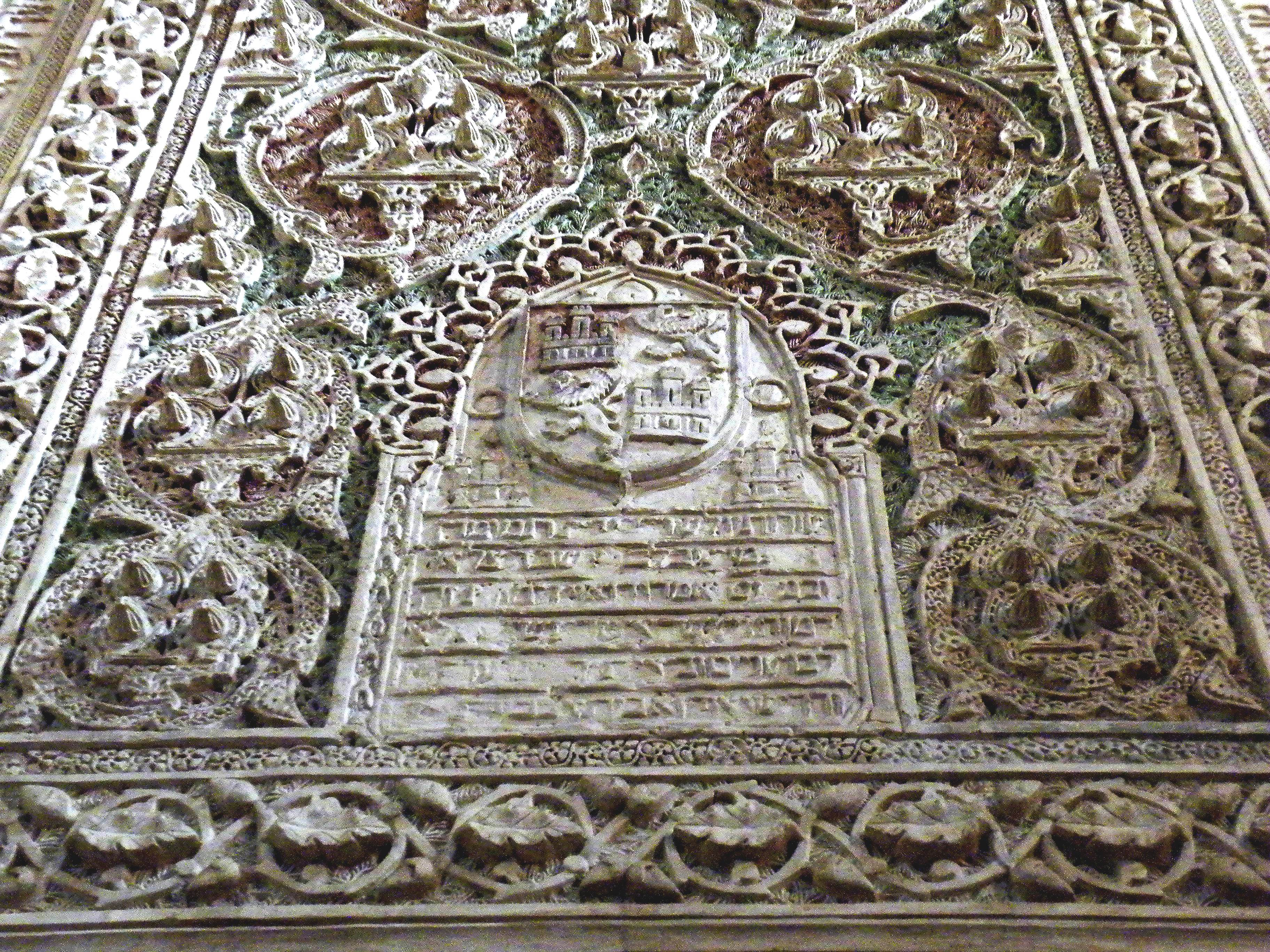
Coat of arms of Castile in the synagogue

== See also ==
- History of the Jews in Spain
- List of synagogues in Spain
