= Synagogue of Santa María la Blanca =

Historic former synagogue, former church, now museum, in Toledo, Spain

Santa María la Blanca
- Spanish: Sinagoga de Santa María La Blanca
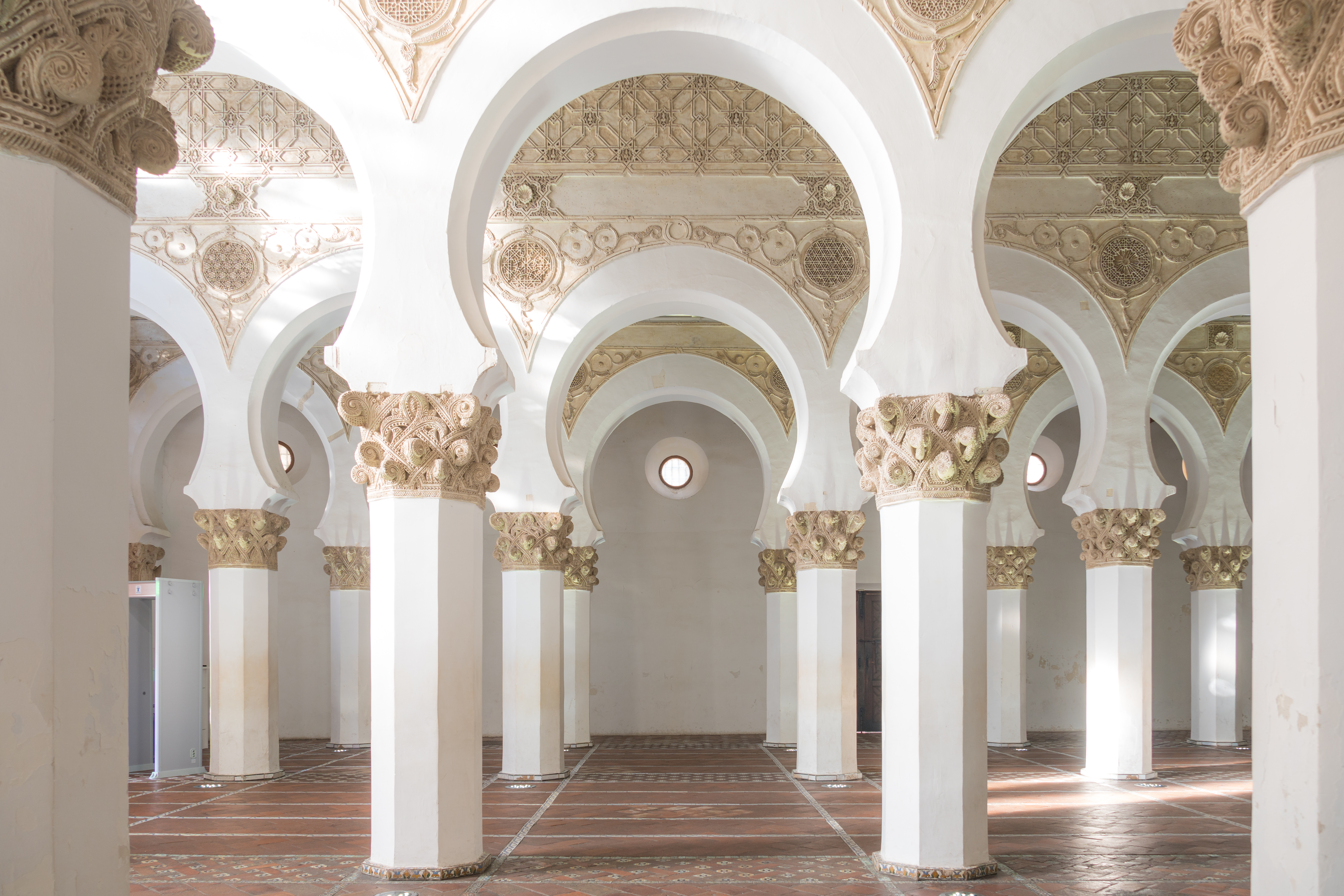
- Interior of the former synagogue and former church, in 2025

- Location of the former synagogue and former church in Castilla-La Mancha

Religion
- Affiliation: Judaism (former); Catholicism
- Rite: Nusach Sefard
- Ecclesiastical or organisational status: Synagogue (c. 1205–1391); Church (c. 1410–16th century)
- Ownership: Roman Catholic Archdiocese of Toledo
- Status: Museum

Location
- Location: 4 Calle Reyes Católicos, Toledo, Castilla-La Mancha
- Country: Spain
- Coordinates: 39°51′25″N 4°1′49″W

Architecture
- Architect: Alonso de Covarrubias (1556)
- Type: Synagogue
- Style: Mudéjar/Moorish (with minor Renaissance additions)
- Completed: c. 1205 (as a synagogue); 1556 (as a church)
- Materials: Stone

Spanish Cultural Heritage
- Official name: Sinagoga de Santa María la Blanca
- Type: Monumento Iglesia
- Designated: 4 July 1930
- Reference no.: RI-51-0000346

The Synagogue of Santa María la Blanca (Spanish: Sinagoga de Santa María La Blanca, lit. 'Synagogue of Saint Mary the White'), also known as the Ibn Shoshan Synagogue, is a former Jewish congregation and synagogue, located at 4 Calle Reyes Católicos, in the historic old city of Toledo, in the province of Castilla-La Mancha, Spain.

The synagogue is located in the former Jewish quarter of the city between the Monastery of San Juan de los Reyes and the Synagogue of El Tránsito. It is one of three preserved synagogues constructed by Jews in a Mudéjar or Moorish style under the rule of the Christian Kingdom of Castile. In 1930, the building was added to the list of monuments of Spanish Cultural Heritage (Spanish: Bien de Interés Cultural).

== History ==
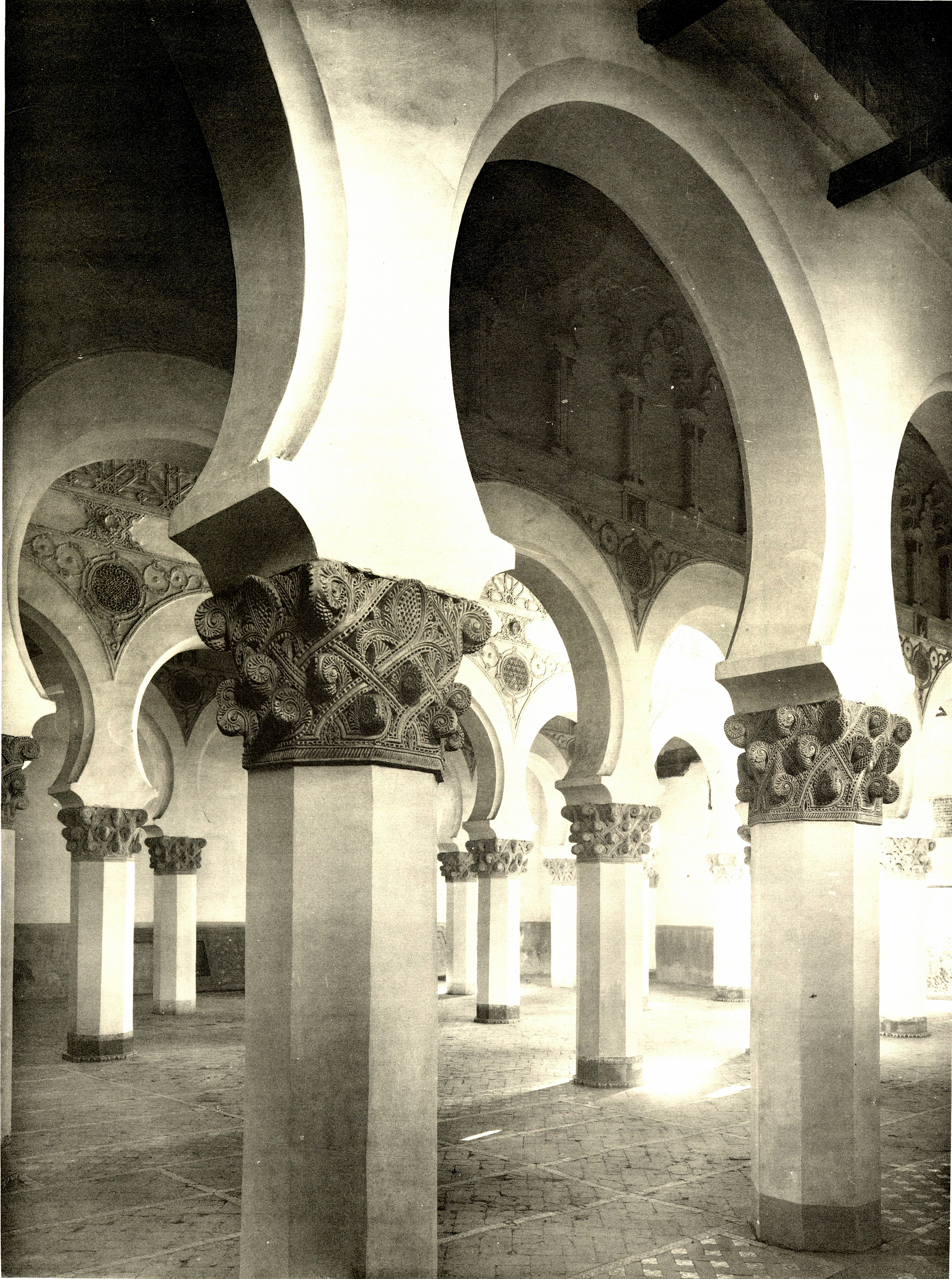
Interior of the building, in a collotype from 1889

=== Origins ===
The exact origins and original specifications of the synagogue prove difficult to place. Evidence points toward a construction date sometime in the late twelfth century or early thirteenth century CE. Supporting evidence for this dating is the structure's architectural style, which is close to that of Almohad monuments of the twelfth century, such as the Tinmal Mosque (1149) and Kutubiyya mosque (1147).

One commonly accepted opinion is that it was erected sometime around 1205, as documents from the time mention a "new", great synagogue located in Toledo. Another theory arises from a wooden tablet found in the area that describes a new structure, saying, "Its ruins were raised up in the year 4940" [CE 1180]. If this inscription indeed refers to the Synagogue of Santa María la Blanca, then the synagogue may in fact be a reconstruction of an existing building or a new building located on the same plot as a demolished one. One hypothesis that has been raised to explain the synagogue's layout is that may have been taken from a preexisting mosque located on the same site. Another former synagogue building in Segovia (destroyed after a fire in 1899) had a very similar layout, which suggests that more synagogues of this type may have once existed in the region.

Some historians, such as Leopoldo Torres Balbás, note similarities between the plaster work in the aisles of Santa María la Blanca and the convent Las Huelgas de Burgos, which is of a later date, around 1275. According to Carol Herselle Krinsky, however, the scale and proportion of the ornamentation, the blank canvas against which the ornamentation is placed, as well as the way in which light is used in the space all correspond more closely with the twelfth-century mosques and thus with an earlier construction date.

It is also somewhat unclear who might be the patron of the original synagogue, although there is some evidence for Joseph ben Meir ben Shoshan, or Yusef Abenxuxen, as the original patron. Joseph was the son of a finance minister to King Alfonso VIII of Castile and, upon his death in 1205, his epitaph mentions his having built a synagogue. Some theories suggest Joseph rebuilt the synagogue after a pogrom against Jews in Toledo. This may be the cause for the building's irregular floor plan and again points to a late-twelfth-century construction.

=== Conversion to church ===
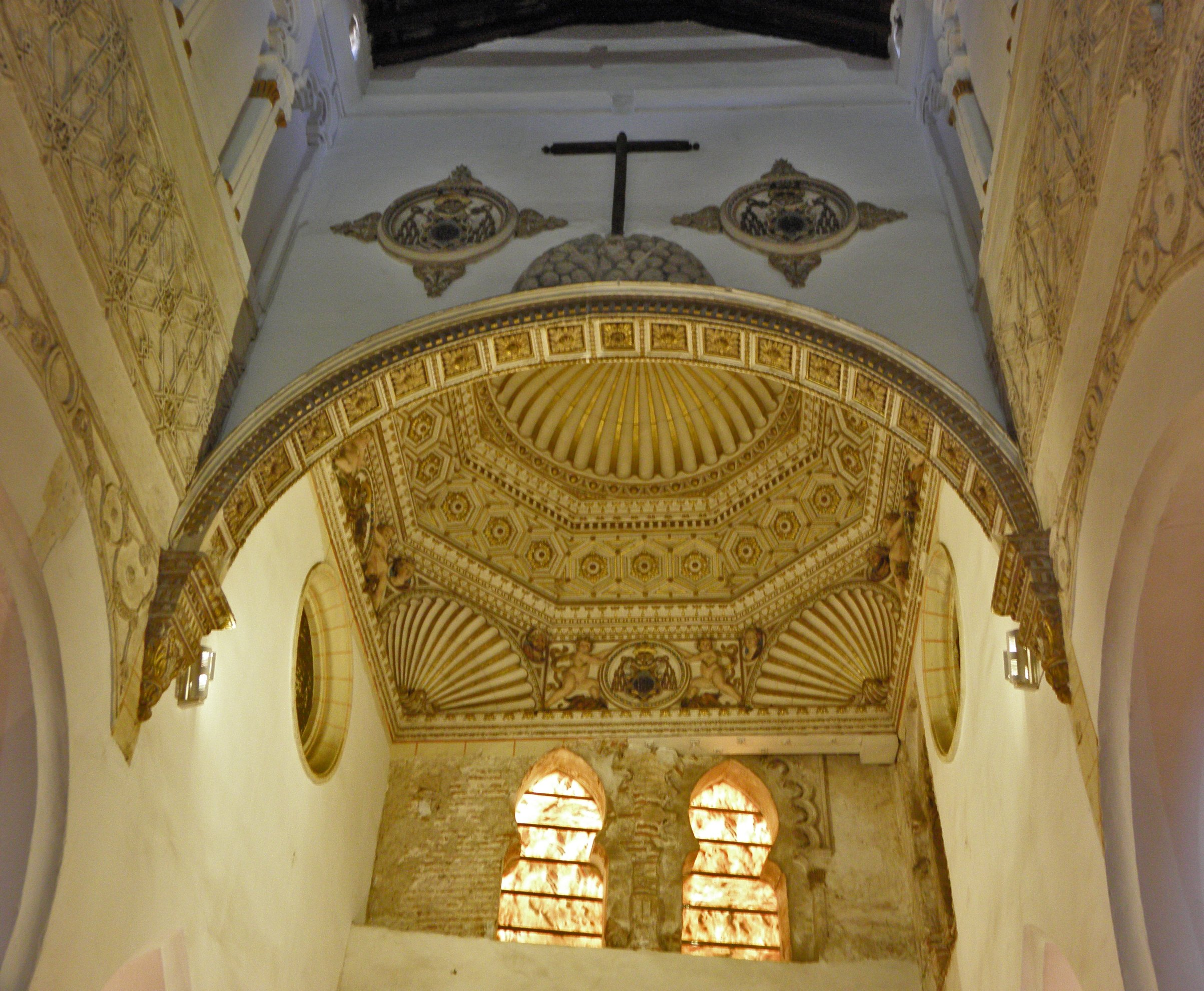
One of the Renaissance apses (1550–1556)

As a result of the pogroms of 1391 and the anti-Jewish preaching of Vicente Ferrer, the synagogue was sacked and then appropriated by the Catholic church. It was officially consecrated as a church in the early 15th century, though sources vary in stating the exact year: some cite 1401, 1405, 1410, or 1411. The church was given to the Order of Calatrava. Its present name, Santa Maria la Blanca ('Saint Mary the White') dates from this time and comes from an effigy of Mary that was kept inside. Between 1550 and 1556 three small apses were added to the back of the building to serve as chapels, still visible today. They are designed in a Renaissance style and are attributed to Alonso de Covarrubias.

The building was later used as a military barracks, a warehouse, and a dancehall. The building was eventually declared a national memorial site and restored in 1856. The government restored Santa María la Blanca to the care of the archdiocese through a local parish in 1929. Today it is a museum and tourist attraction.

=== Request for return to Judaism ===
In 2013 the Jewish community of Toledo asked the Roman Catholic Archbishop of Toledo, Braulio Rodríguez Plaza, to transfer ownership and custodianship of the building to them. The archbishop met twice with Isaac Querub, president of Spain's Federation of Jewish Communities, who said that there was, no Jewish community in Toledo today but that the federation was not looking to reclaim Santa María la Blanca as a place of worship but a "symbolic gesture". There is no judicial recourse because the modern Jewish community are not direct descendants of the original owners. The building, the third most visited historic monument in Toledo, is presently a museum and is not used for any religious ceremonies. Since 2013, the archdiocese has spent almost €800,000 (£685,000) on conserving the building.

== Architecture ==
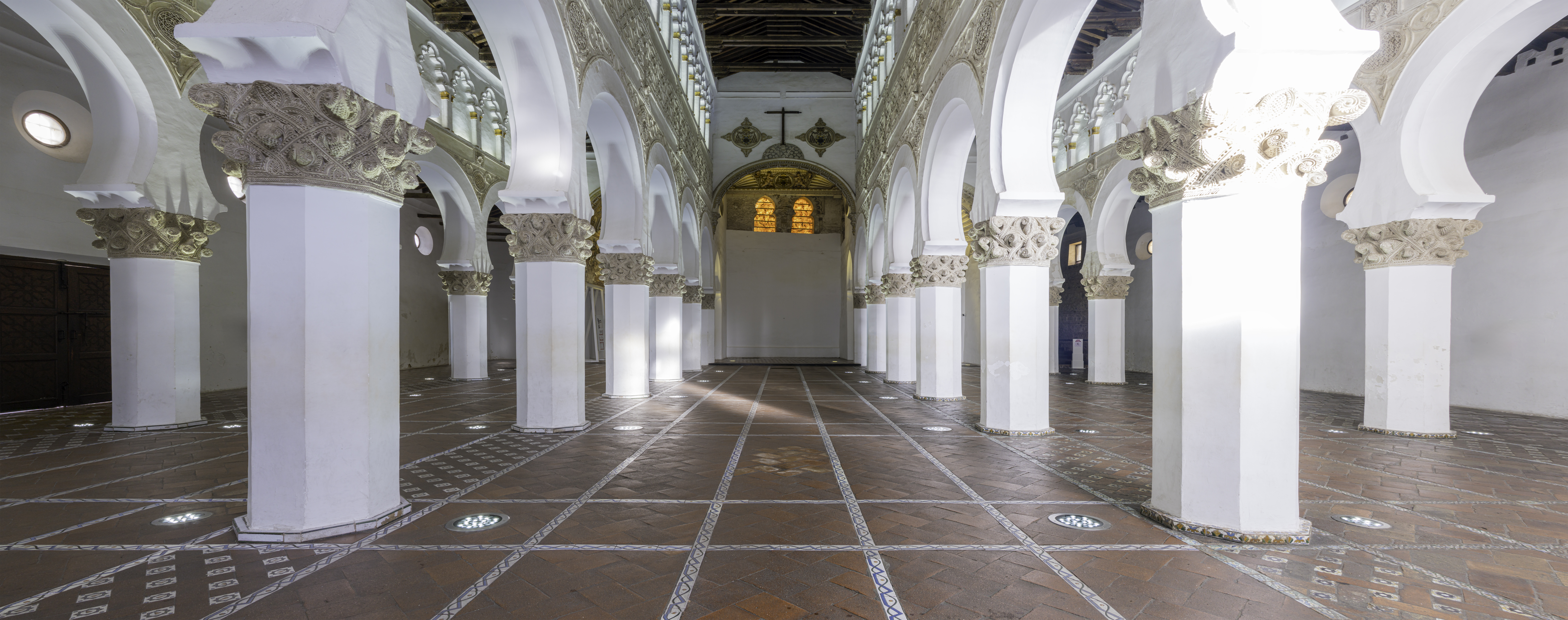
Interior panorama

=== Style ===
The synagogue is a Mudéjar construction, created by Moorish architects for non-Islamic purposes. But it can also be considered one of the finest example of Almohad architecture because of its construction elements and style. The plain white interior walls as well as the use of brick and of pillars instead of columns are characteristics of Almohad architecture. There are also nuances in its architectural classification, because although it was constructed as a synagogue, its hypostyle room and the lack of a women's gallery make it closer in character to a mosque. Though it does not have a women's gallery today, an early twentieth century architect suggested that it did at one time have one.

=== Design ===
The former Synagogue of Santa María la Blanca was wholly unusual in both plan and elevation. The floor plan is an irregular quadrilateral divided into five aisles, with the central nave aisle slightly larger than the remaining four. The space runs between 26 and 28 meters long and between 19 and 23 meters wide. The interior features a series of arcades supported on a network of twenty-four octagonal piers and eight engaged piers. These octagonal supports line the central aisle of the synagogue and support the large arcade of horseshoe arches above. The arches rest on intricately detailed capitals with finely carved pinecones and other vegetal imagery. These capitals are Mudéjar in style and are derived from classical, Corinthian antecedents as well as Byzantine concepts.

The building is surrounded by a courtyard. This courtyard served as a place for the people to congregate before and after prayer services and also held the different communal institutions. The Rabbi's residence, a ritual bath, a study hall, and other things the community may have invested in were all built in this courtyard to give the Jewish community a central place for care of their spiritual needs.

== Gallery ==
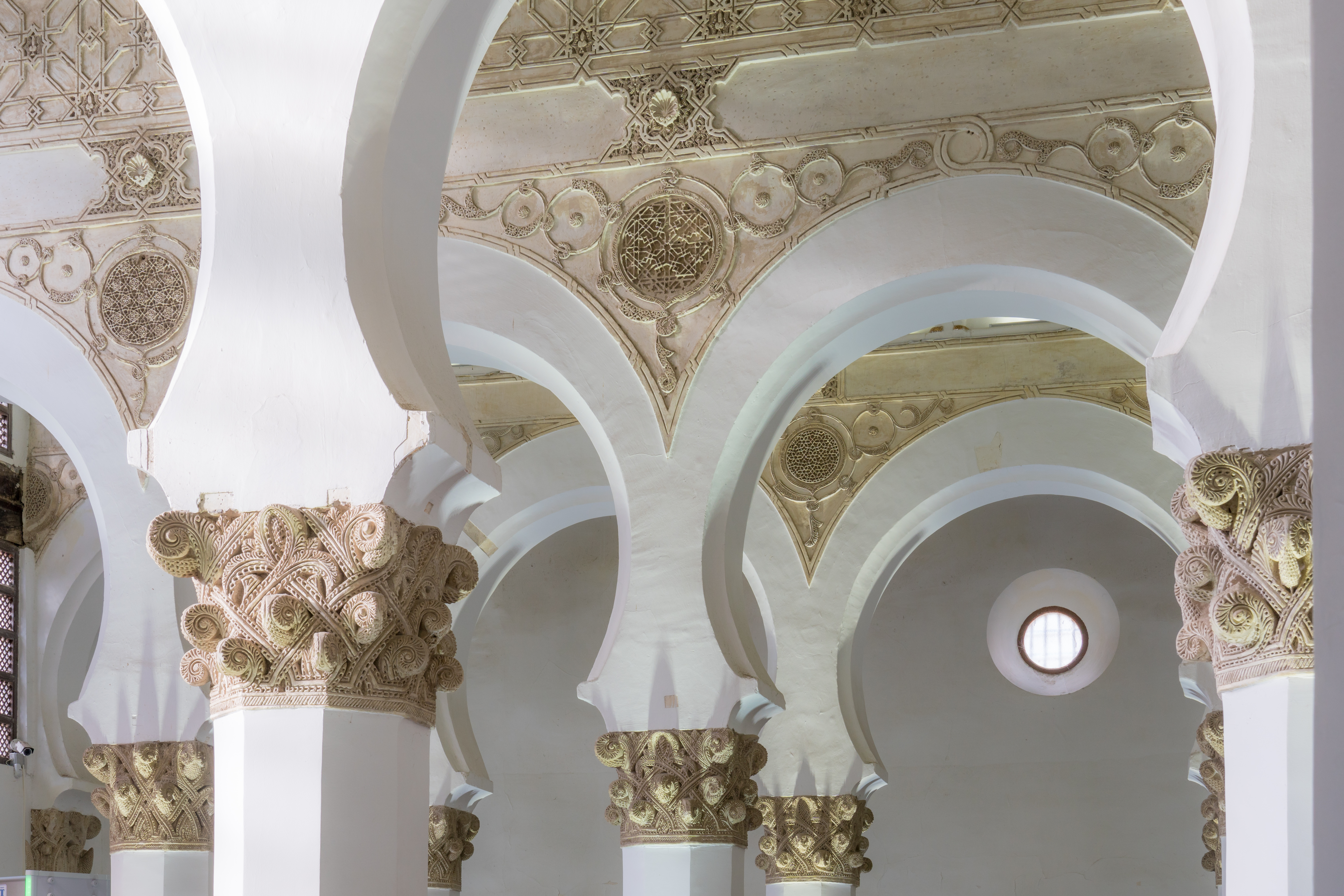
Detail of the arches

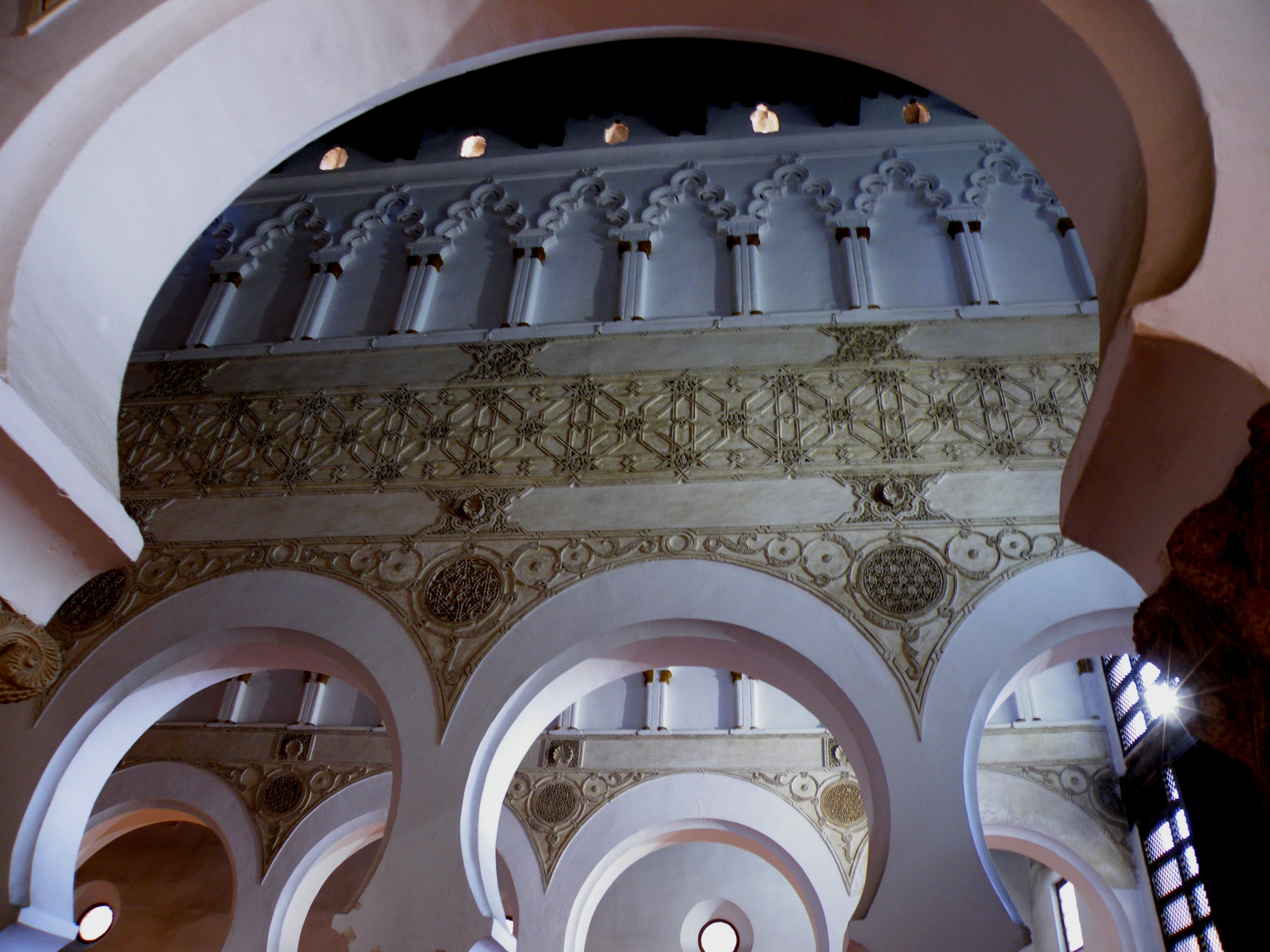
Ceiling and upper walls of the arches

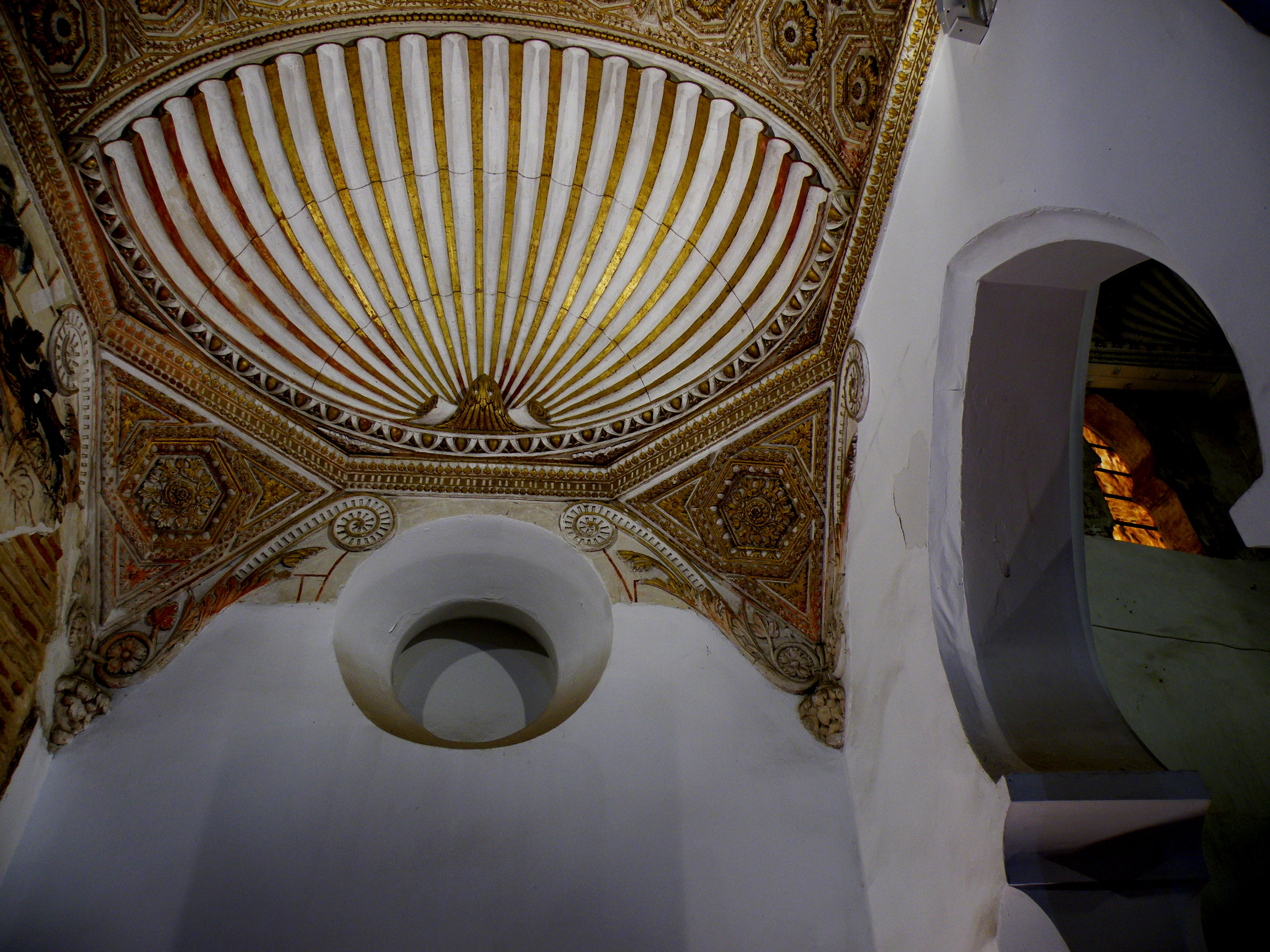
A scallop motif in one of the Renaissance apses

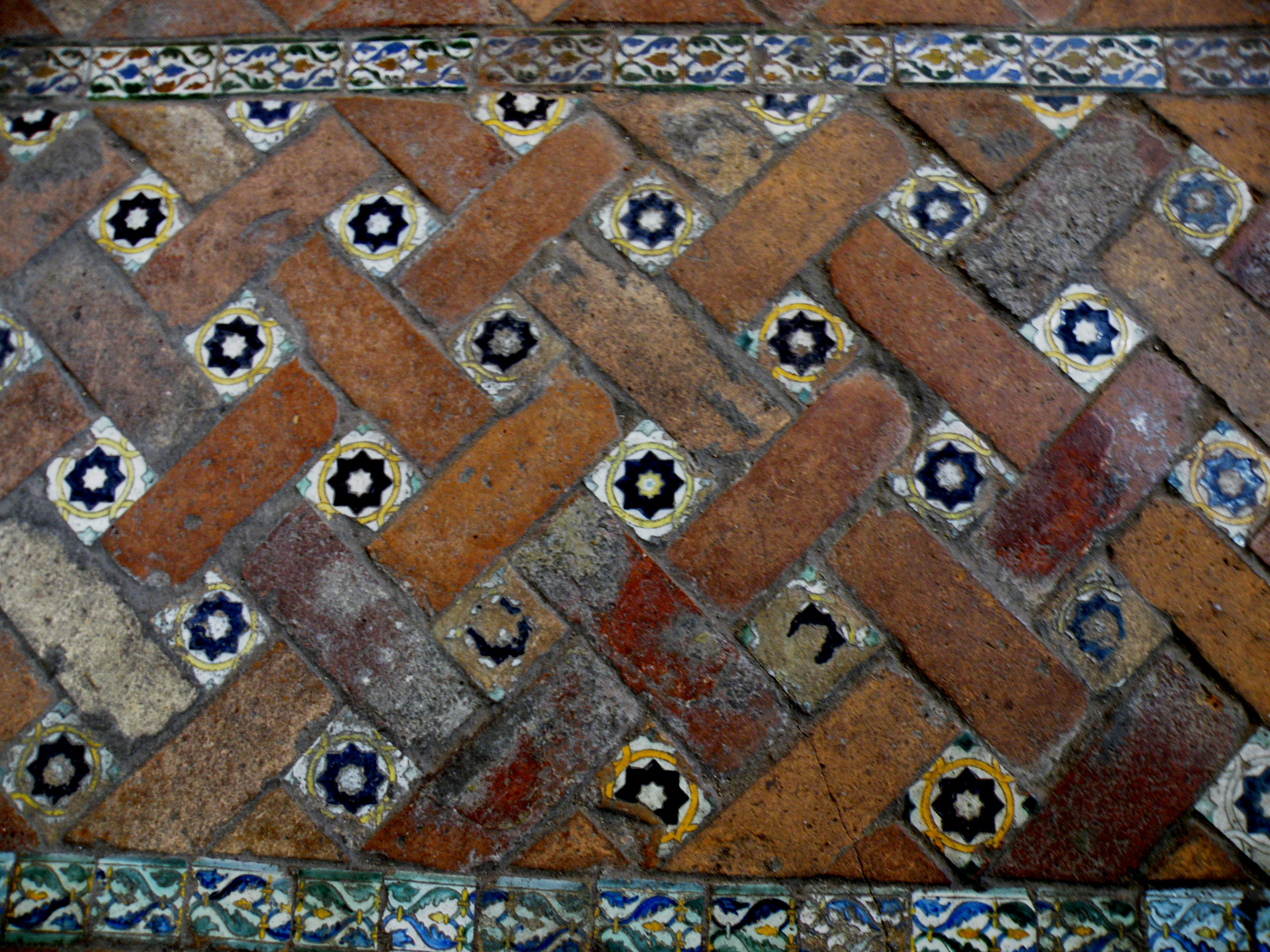
Floor mosaic

== See also ==
- History of the Jews in Spain
- List of synagogues in Spain
- Synagogue of Tomar
