= Old synagogues of Tiberias =

Group of synagogues in Tiberias, Israel

The Old synagogues of Tiberias are a group of Jewish synagogue buildings that are situated in the old city of Tiberias, Israel The synagogues were established in the 18th and 19th centuries.

== Overview ==
They include:

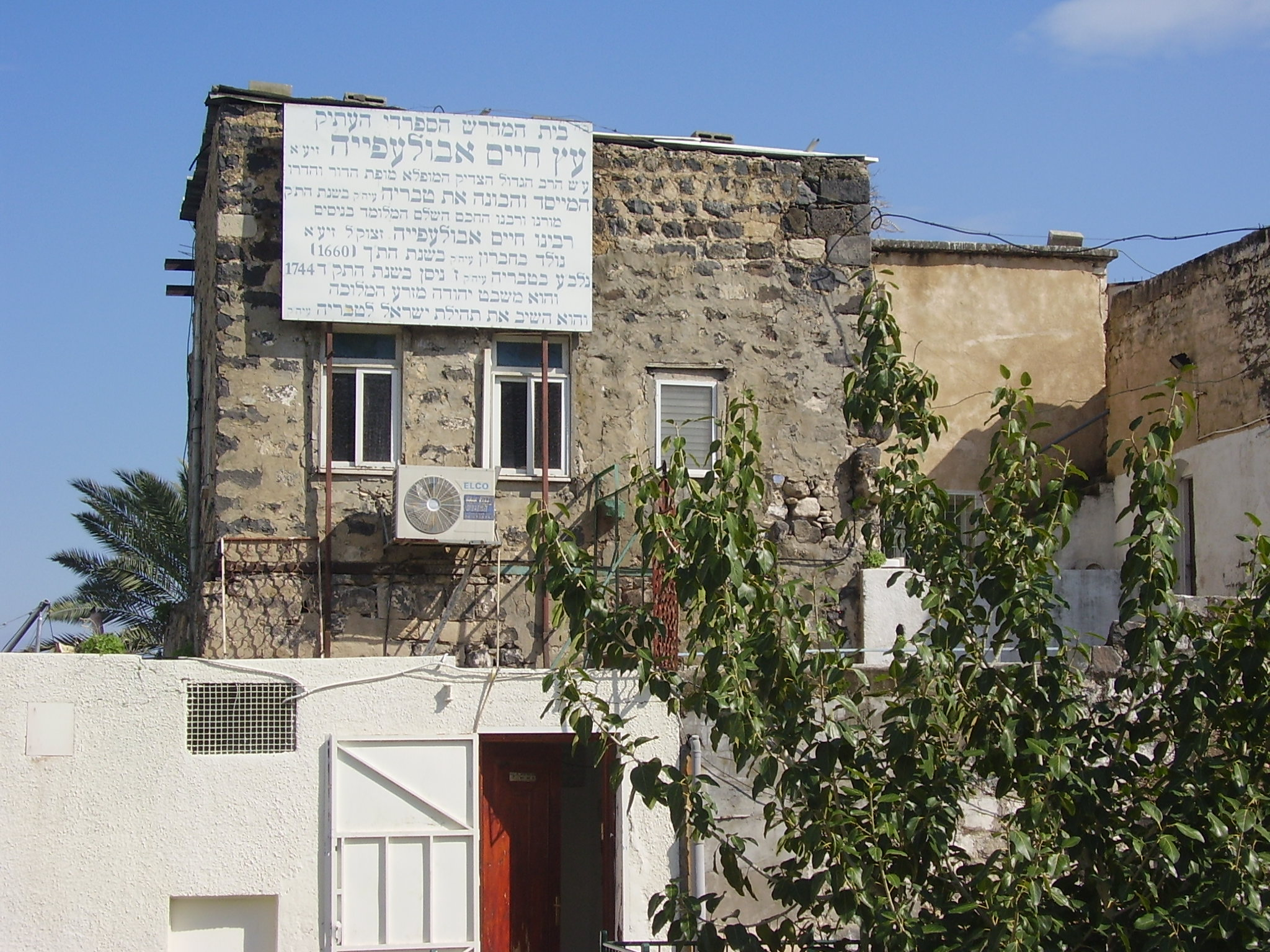
Abulafia Synagogue

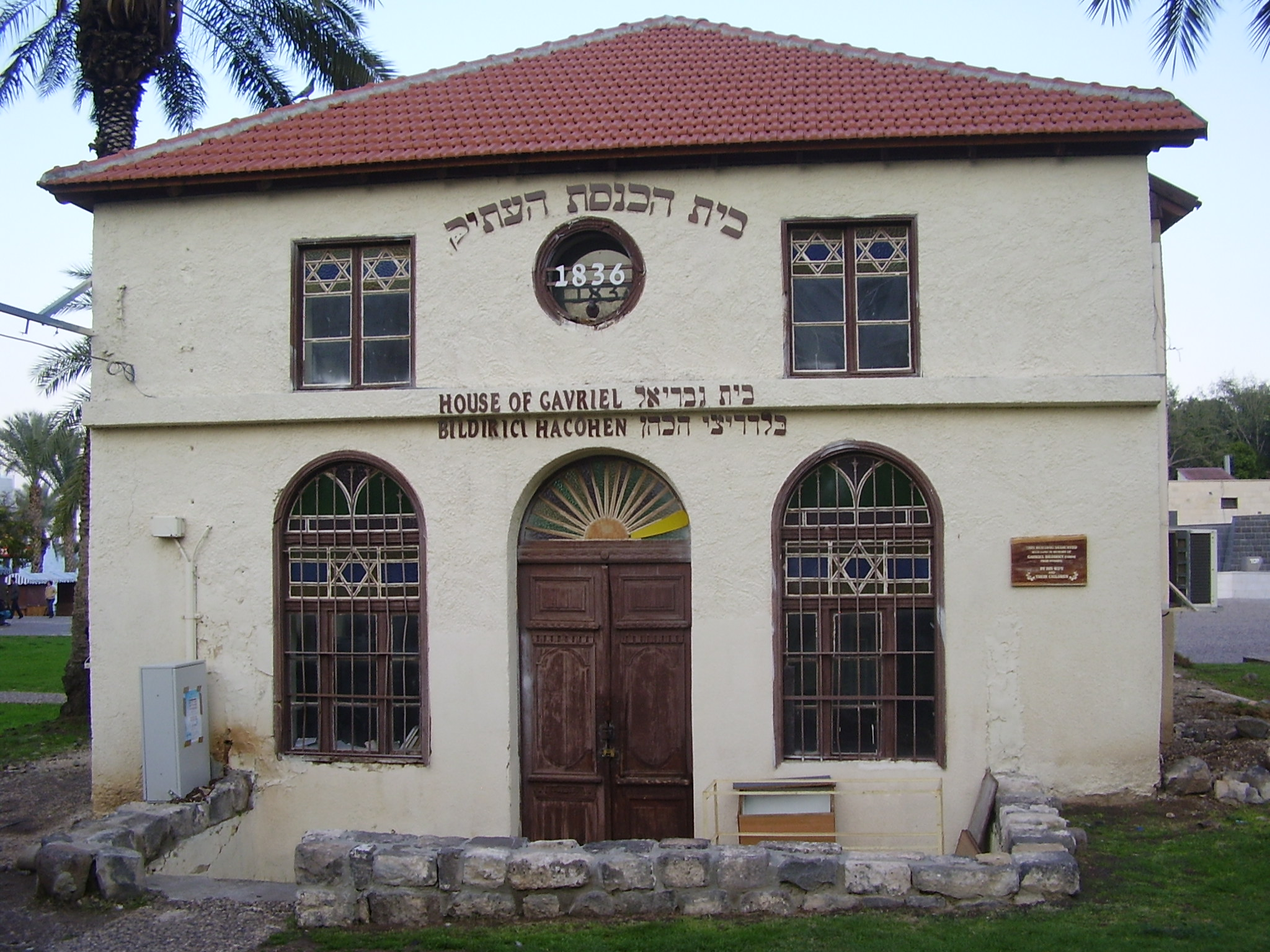
Beth Gavriel

- The Etz Chaim Synagogue or Abulafia Synagogue, established in 1742 by Rabbi Chaim Abulafia on the site of earlier synagogues. Abulafiah immigrated to Tiberias from Istanbul in 1740 at the invitation of Zahir al-Umar. The synagogue he built still stands, although it underwent major reconstruction following the Near East earthquake of 1759, the Galilee earthquake of 1837 and the great flood of 1934. The current structure was completed in 1950 by the local community.
- The Karlin-Stolin Synagogue, established by Karlin-Stolin Hasidim who arrived in the Holy Land in the mid-19th century, settling in Tiberias, Hebron and Safed. In 1869 they redeemed the site of a former synagogue in Tiberias which had been built in 1786 by Menachem Mendel of Vitebsk and destroyed in the Galilee earthquake of 1837. Construction of a new synagogue started in 1870 and was assisted by funds from the diaspora. The synagogue has a notable Torah Ark in Eastern European style.
- The Chabad-Lubavitch Synagogue, affiliated with the Chabad movement, occupies a building originally constructed by Boyan Hasidim in 1836. After periods of disuse, the Chabad movement restored the synagogue, which now serves both the local community and tourists visiting Tiberias.
- The El Senor Sephardic Synagogue, now a standing ruin with an intact roof, was built by Rabbi Chaim Shmuel HaCohen Konverti after the earthquake of 1837. Konverti, a wealthy and learned Jew from Spain, settled in Tiberias in 1827 and contributed to the city's development by building this synagogue, a Judaica library, and a new home in the Court of the Jews.
- A North African synagogue also exists in Tiberias.
