= The Jewish House, Toledo =

Coordinates: 39.85637°N 4.02964°W

The Jewish House (Casa del Judío) is located in the heart of the Jewish quarter of Toledo, in Castile-La Mancha, Spain. It was built in the 14th and 15th centuries. The two areas of main interest are the courtyard, which retains a multitude of yeserias (carved plasterwork), and above all, the basement that was possibly a Jewish liturgical bath or mikveh, whose function was spiritual purification and preparation for some important event in the life of a Jew. During restorations of adjacent rooms, Almagra style hydraulic plastering has been uncovered, as well as a cistern, all of which support the theory about its use.

Another element of great relevance for its archaeological study is a piece of wood used as a lintel for access to the basement, where it can observe the work of carving with floral motifs, based on tympanums and scrolls, accompanying an epigraphic repertoire whose transcription says: "Thanks I give you, because you have answered my prayers"; Text related to verses 21 of Psalm 18: "Here is the door of Yahveh, through which the righteous come in." 21 "thanks I give you, because you have answered my prayers, and it has been my salvation", which welcomes all those who are faithful and pure at the interior of the house.
