= Siege of Toledo =

Siege of Toledo may refer to:

- Siege of Toledo (930–932)
- Siege of Toledo (1085)
- Siege of Toledo (1090)
- Siege of Toledo (1099)
- Siege of Toledo (1100)
- Siege of Toledo (1196)
- Siege of the Alcázar of Toledo (1936)
