= Richard Aboulafia =

British analyst

Richard Aboulafia is a Managing Director of AeroDynamic Advisory, a boutique aerospace management consulting firm based in Ann Arbor, Michigan. Previously, he was vice president of analysis at Teal Group where he edited their World Military and Civil Aircraft Briefing, a forecasting tool. His job description includes "(managing) consulting projects in the commercial and military aircraft field and analyzes broader defense and aerospace trends."

He is a prominent aircraft industry analyst. He regularly appears on such media outlets as ABC, BBC, Bloomberg, Reuters, CBS, CNN, NBC, NPR and PBS. He is a Contributing Columnist at Aviation Week, and contributes to Forbes.

== Career ==
Aboulafia earned a master's degree in War Studies from King's College, University of London and a bachelor's degree from George Washington University. Before he began his tenure at Teal Group in 1990, Aboulafia worked at Jane's Information Group where he analyzed the jet engine market.

In 2002, Aboulafia co-authored with Aaron Gellman a Boeing funded report on the Airbus A380, released in 2004. Aboulafia was critical of the aircraft believing “the key to Airbus success in Paris (Air Show) is still the A350.”

== Personal life ==
He is married to Casey and they have a son and a daughter.
