= Chaim Nissim Abulafia =

Old Yishuv Rabbi (1775–1861)

Rabbi Chaim Nissim Abulafia
- חיים ניסים אבולעפיה
- Born: 1775; Tiberias, Ottoman Empire
- Died: February 8, 1861 (aged 85-86); Jerusalem, Ottoman Empire
- Resting place: Mount of Olives Jewish Cemetery
- Title: Rishon LeZion
- Term: 1854–1861
- Predecessor: Yitzhak Kovo
- Successor: Chaim David Hazan

Chaim Nissim Abulafia (Hebrew: חיים ניסים אבולעפיה; 1775 – February 8, 1861) was an Ottoman-era rabbi in the city of Tiberias and was the Rishon LeZion in the city of Jerusalem. He additionally served briefly as a rabbi in the city of Damascus.

== Early life ==
Born in Tiberias in 1775 he was the son of David Abulafia. David was the son of Chaim ben Jacob Abulafia, both rabbis in Eretz Yisroel. He is descended from Chaim Abulafia (I), a descendent of persecuted Jews from Spain that came to Israel in the early 17th century. He was injured in the 1837 Galilee earthquake, breaking his leg. He suffered from related problems for the rest of his life, and was known for his extreme humility.

== Rabbinical positions ==
During Abulafia's period as the rabbi of Tiberias, he went to the Ottoman army commander in Sidon to demand the protection of the Jewish residents in the city from rioters following the 1834 looting of Safed pogrom and pogroms following the Battle of Hebron. He succeeded in his appeal and soldiers were sent to protect the locals.

After he turned 50, he moved to Jerusalem to find a suitable marriage for his daughter. There he later succeeded Yitzhak Kovo as the Rishon LeZion following Kovo's death until his own. During that period of his life, he encouraged the establishment of general schools despite large opposition to the idea from local Ashkenazi rabbis of the area.

== Death and legacy ==
Abulafia had extensive writings that were never published, but some of his rulings were printed in responsa by Rabbi Benjamin Mordecai Navon. He died in 1861 and was buried in the Mount of Olives Jewish Cemetery. He was eulogized by Rabbi Haim Palachi of Smyrna.

His daughter, Sarah Esther, married Rabbi Shalom Moshe Gagin. Additionally, through his son Yitzhak, he is the grandfather of Shlomo Abulafia, one of the founders of Tel Aviv.
