= Mitchell Aboulafia =

American philosopher

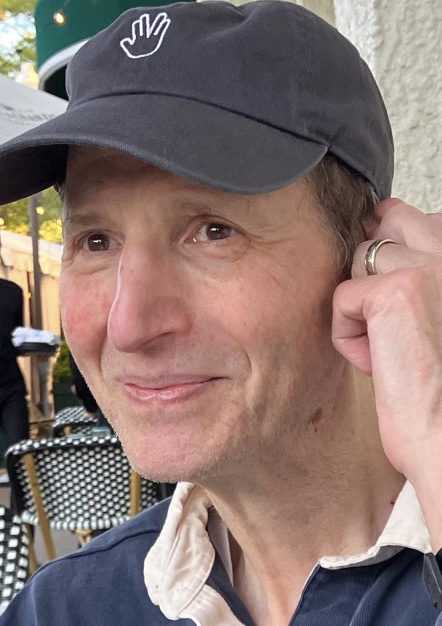
- Born: The Bronx

Education
- Education: Boston College (PhD), Stony Brook University (BA)
- Thesis: Finitude, Infinity and Time: A Study in Hegel's Idea of System (1978)

Philosophical work
- Era: Contemporary philosophy
- Region: Western philosophy
- Institutions: Manhattan College, Juilliard School, Penn State University, University of Colorado-Denver, University of Houston-Clear Lake
- Main interests: American pragmatism, European thought, social theory

Mitchell Aboulafia is an American philosopher, social theorist, and Professor Emeritus of Philosophy at Manhattan College. He is known for his works on American pragmatism and George Herbert Mead's thought.

== Career ==
Aboulafia earned his bachelor's degree in philosophy at Stony Brook University in 1973, and a PhD in philosophy from Boston College in 1978. He taught at the University of Houston-Clear Lake before serving as the head of departments at the University of Colorado at Denver, the Pennsylvania State University-University Park, and Manhattan College, as well as director of Interdivisional Liberal Arts at The Juilliard School. In 2004, he received the Distinguished PhD Award from Boston College's philosophy faculty to mark the 75th anniversary of the graduate school. He served as co-editor of the journal Contemporary Pragmatism from 2008 to 2013, and as a member of the executive Board of the Society for the Advancement of American Philosophy, 1992–1995.

== Research ==
Aboulafia has written on American Philosophy and European Thought, often with the goal of placing figures from different traditions in conversation. Building on the insights of George Herbert Mead, Aboulafia has developed an original theory of the self and self-determination, which has implications for the fields of sociology, social psychology, and ethics, in addition to philosophy. His most recent book, Transcendence: On Cosmopolitanism and Self-Determination (Stanford), addresses cosmopolitanism in the context of respecting cultural differences.

== Books ==
- Transcendence: On Self-Determination and Cosmopolitanism, Stanford University Press. 2010.
- Habermas and Pragmatism, edited with Myra Bookman and Cathy Kemp, Routledge. 2002.
- The Cosmopolitan Self: George Herbert Mead and Continental Philosophy, University of Illinois Press. 2001.
- Philosophy, Social Theory, and the Thought of George Herbert Mead (ed.), SUNY Press. 1991.
- The Mediating Self: Mead, Sartre, and Self-Determination, Yale University Press. 1986.
- The Self-Winding Circle: A Study of Hegel’s System, W.H. Green. 1982.
