= Hayyim ben Jacob Abulafia =

Israeli rabbinical authority

Personal life
- Born: 1660 Hebron, Ottoman Palestine
- Died: 1744 (aged 83–84) Tiberias, Ottoman Syria
- Occupation: Rabbi

Religious life
- Religion: Judaism
- Denomination: Judaism

Jewish leader
- Main work: "Mikrae Kodesh"; "Yosef Lekach"; "Yashresh Ya'akob"; "Shebut Ya'akob"

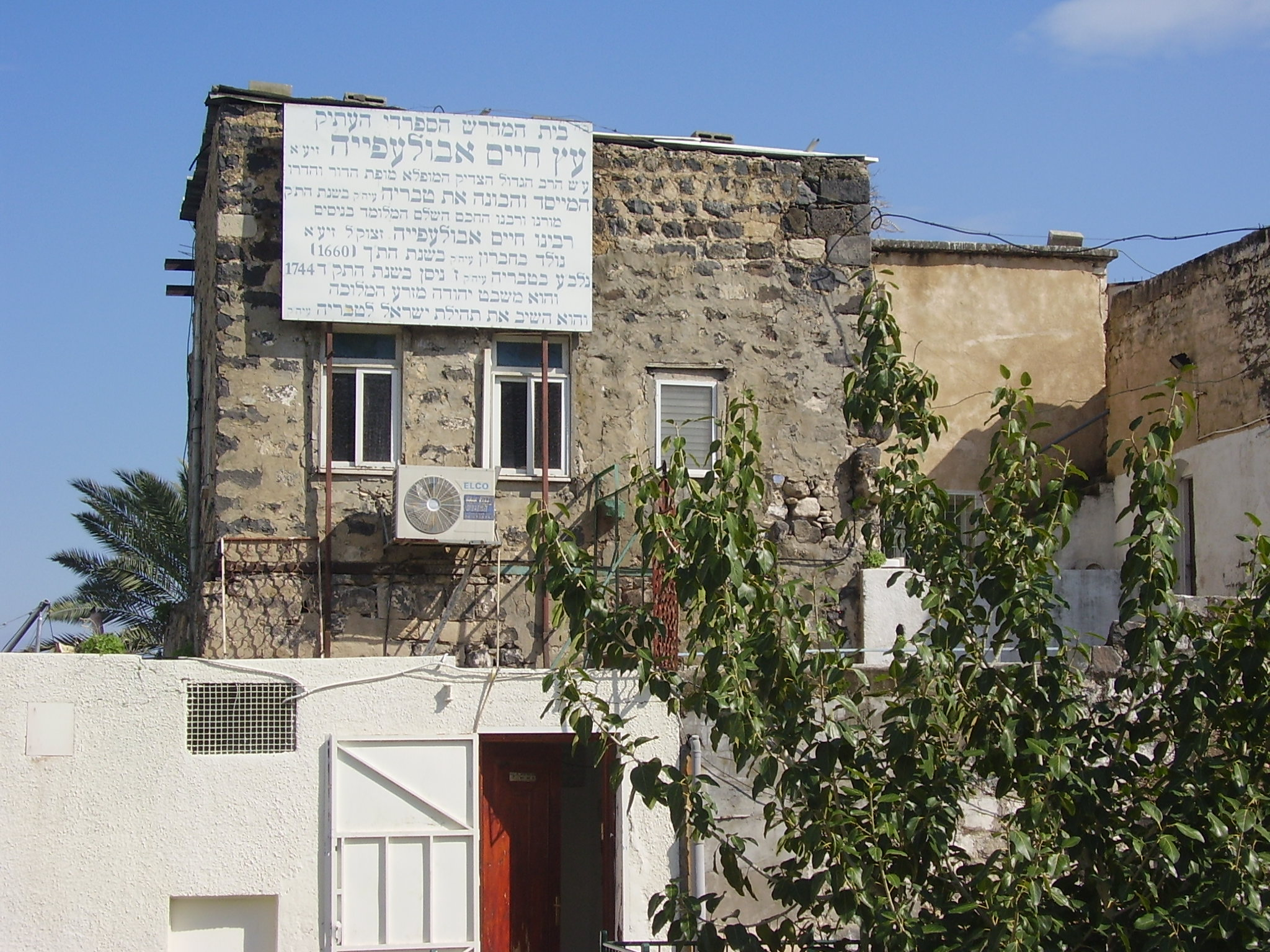
Abulafia Synagogue, Tiberias

Hayyim ben Jacob Abulafia (born 1660 in Hebron, died 1744 in Tiberias, Ottoman Syria) was a rabbinical authority. He was the grandfather of Chaim Nissim Abulafia and grandson of Isaac Nissim ben Gamil. Abulafia was a rabbi in Smyrna, where he instituted many wholesome regulations. In his old age (1740) he restored the Jewish community in Tiberias.

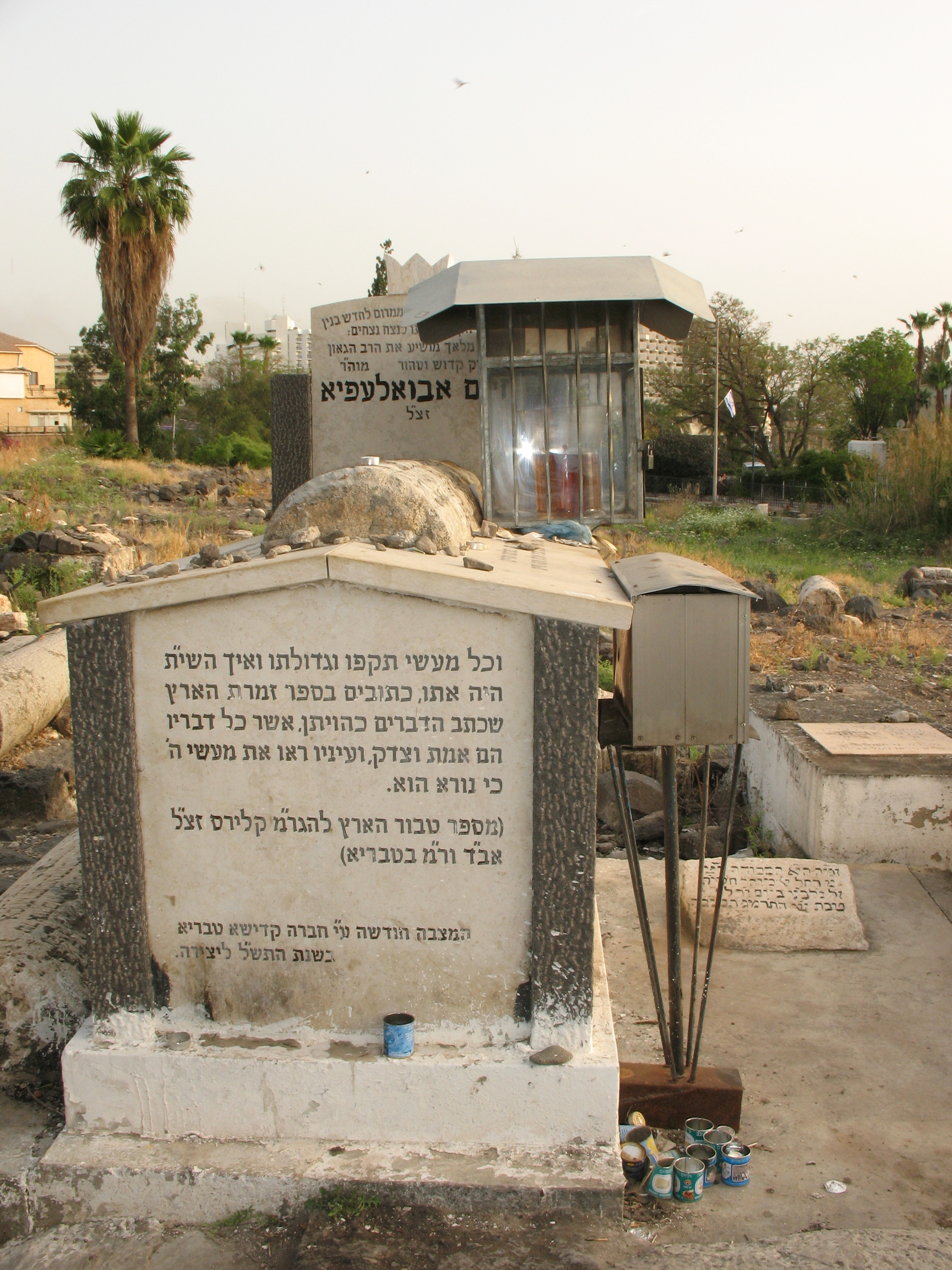
The tomb of Rabbi Abulafia in the old cemetery of Tiberias.

He is the author of several works, including:

1. "Mikrae Kodesh" (Holy Convocations), Smyrna, 1729, containing treatises on Biblical and Talmudical themes;
2. "Yosef Lekach" (Increase of Learning), Smyrna, 1730–32, a work in three volumes on the Pentateuch;
3. "Yashresh Ya'akob" (Jacob Will Take Root), Smyrna, 1729; and
4. "Shebut Ya'akob" (The Captivity of Jacob), Smyrna, 1733, an elaborate commentary on the haggadic compilation "'Ein Yaakov," by Jacob ibn Habib and others.

== See also ==
- Daher al-Umar, sheikh of Tiberias who invited Abulafia to settle in the town
