= Todros ben Joseph Abulafia =

13th-century Spanish rabbi

Todros ben Joseph Abulafia (Hebrew: טודרוס בן יוסף אבולעפיה, 1225 – c. 1285) (Hebrew: טודרוס בן יוסף אבולעפא) was a nephew of Meir Abulafia and Chief Rabbi of Castile. Born in Burgos, Spain to a prominent rabbinical family, he moved to Castile and was welcomed by the court of Alfonso X of Castile, joining the royal retinue on a trip to France in 1275. He is the author of Otzar HaKavod, a mystical commentary on the Aggadah, among other works. In his sermon Zikaron LeYehudah, he condemned what he saw as a lack of modesty in the community.

He died in the city of Toledo.
