= Wadi Hilweh =

Palestinian village and Israeli settlement site

Coordinates: 31°46′25″N 35°14′08″E

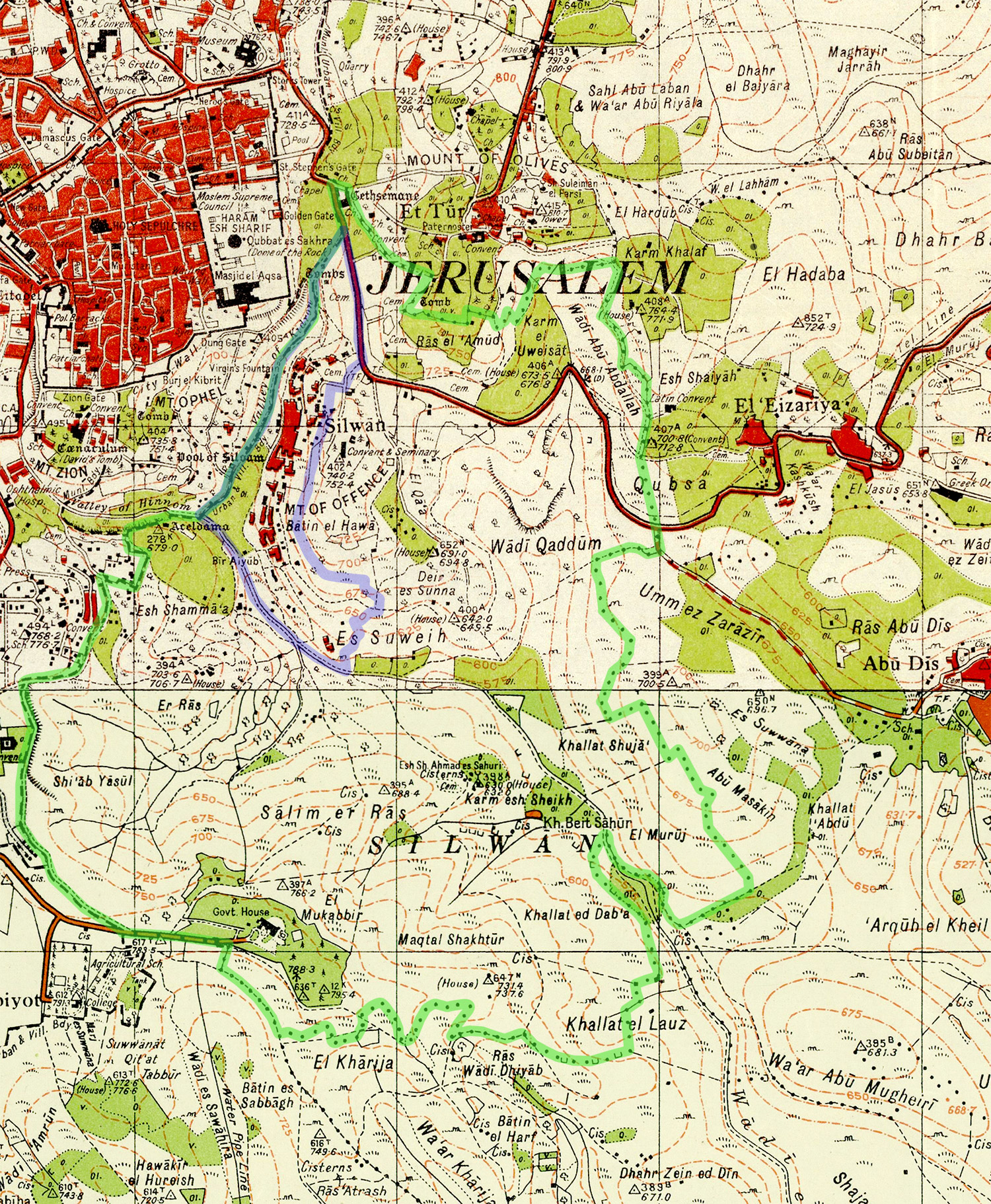
The village boundary of Silwan in 1943–1946 is outlined in green. The boundary of Silwan in 2020 according to the Israeli municipal plan of Jerusalem is outlined in blue (note that this area is in East Jerusalem).

Wadi Hilweh (Arabic: وادي حلوة) is the Arabic name of a majority Palestinian Arab neighborhood of Jerusalem. It is the subject of a naming dispute with the Israeli government and others calling the area the City of David (Hebrew: עיר דוד, romanized: ʿĪr Davīd). It was included within the boundaries of Silwan during Jordanian and early Israeli control, and some still consider it part of Silwan, but it is currently treated as separate neighborhood by Israel's Jerusalem municipality. It intertwines with an Israeli settlement.

The Silwan area of East Jerusalem was annexed by Jordan following the 1948 Arab–Israeli War and then by Israel following the 1967 Six-Day War and the 1980 Jerusalem Law. Neither Israel's or Jordan's actions were recognized internationally by most countries. Jordan annexed an expanded Silwan into its Municipality of Jerusalem in 1961. The United States recognized Israeli control of Jerusalem in 2017. Most of the international community regards Israeli settlements as illegal under international law, although Israel disputes this. Israel viewed itself as a successor state to the partition of Palestine along with Jordan.

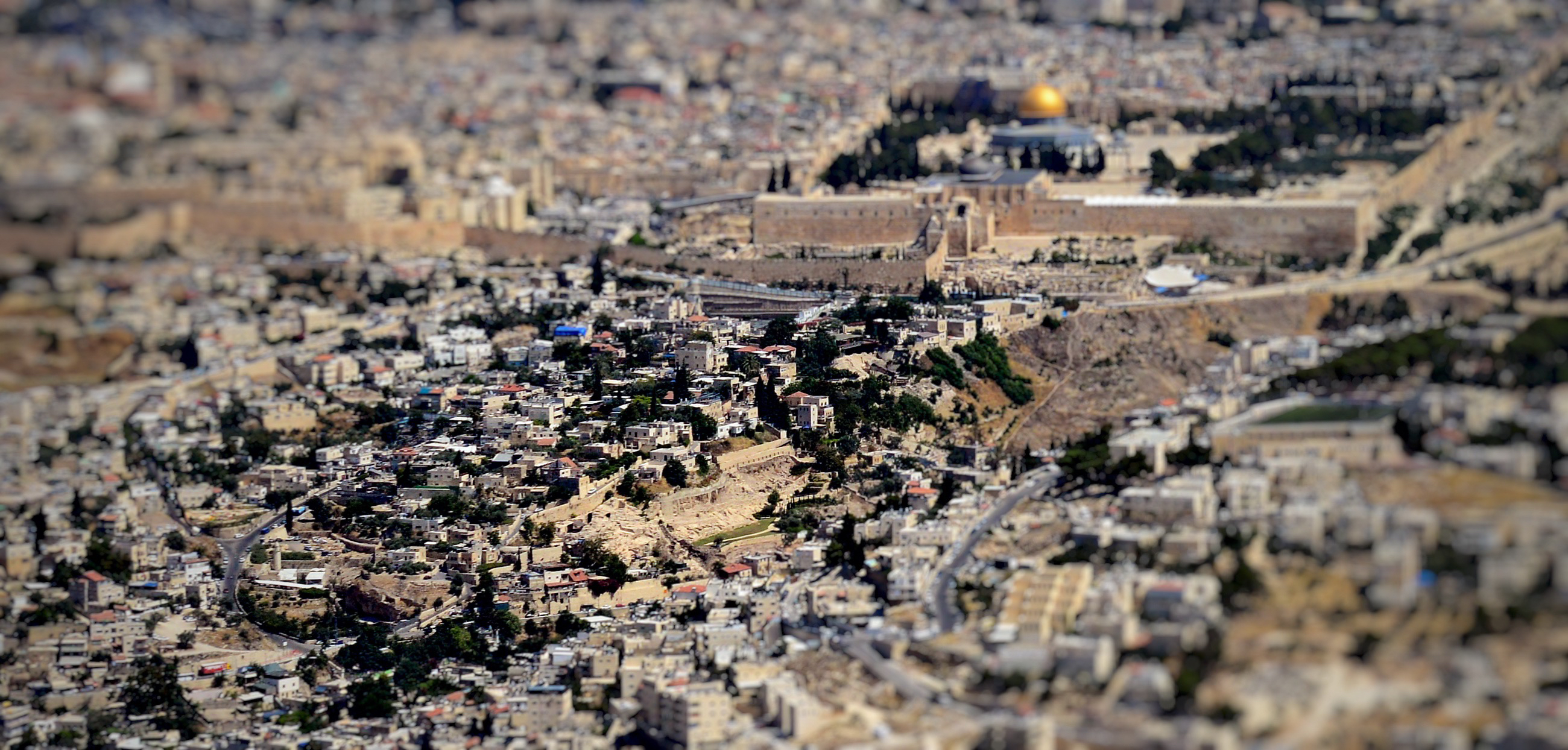
The "City of David", or the Palestinian village of Wadi Hilweh, shown from the air in 2013

The Wadi Hilweh neighborhood developed as an extension of the village of Silwan. Silwan originated on Ras el-Amud, the southwestern slope of the Mount of Olives, and started to expand across the Kidron Valley in the early twentieth century. The resulting Wadi Hilweh neighborhood stretches over historical Jerusalem's Southeast Hill (Note: "The Southeast Hill is the most excavated place in Jerusalem, with a history of more than 150 years of exploration.") (sometimes called the Ophel, although the meaning of that term is more vague), extending down from the southern wall of the Old City. On the western site is the Tyropoeon or central valley. The Arabic name of the neighborhood may come from a section of this valley. On the eastern side is the Kidron Valley, known in Arabic by different names, including Wadi Sitti Maryam or the Valley of St. Mary.

== Modern history ==
=== Late Ottoman period ===
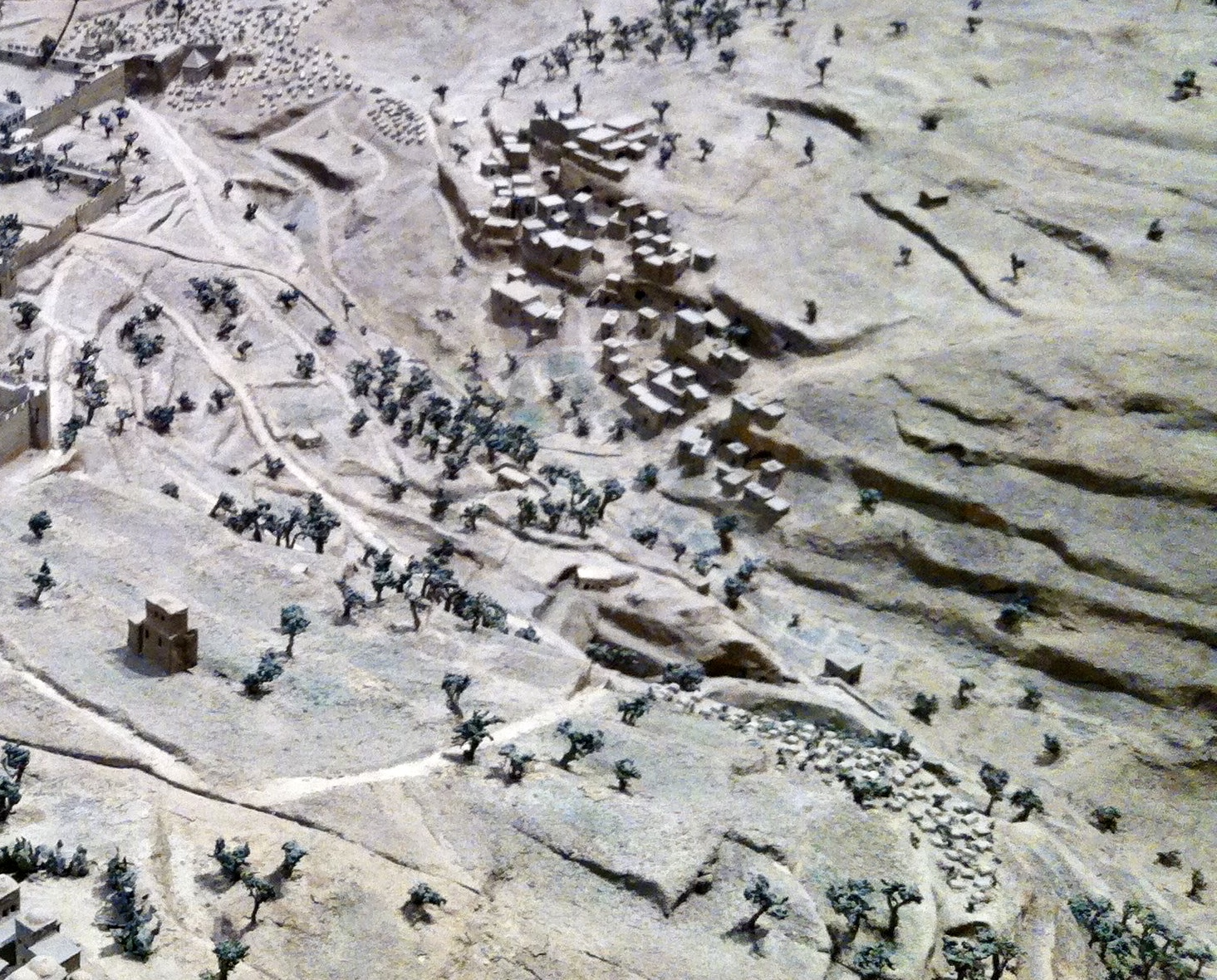
c.1870 (Illés Relief)

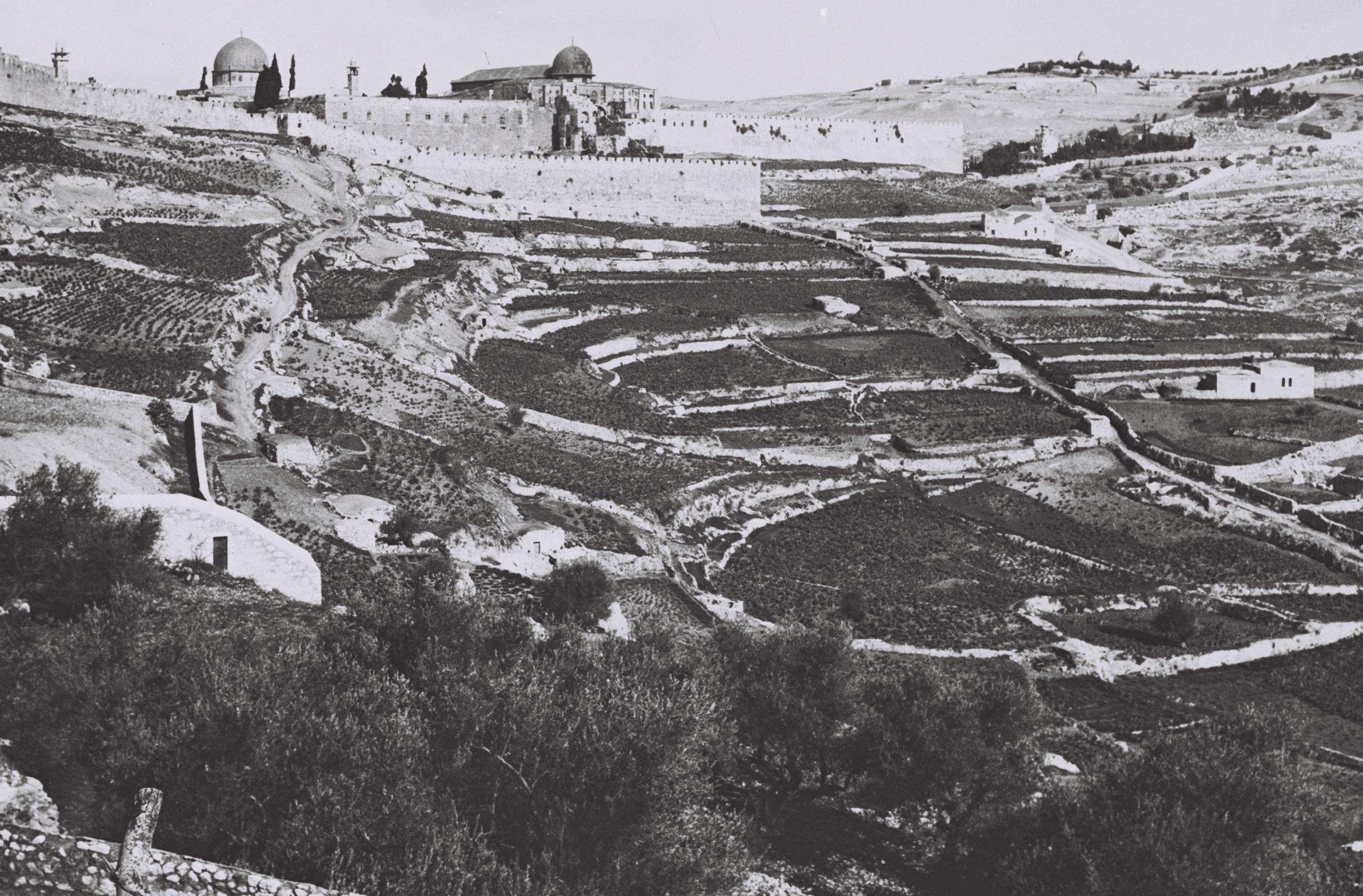
1910

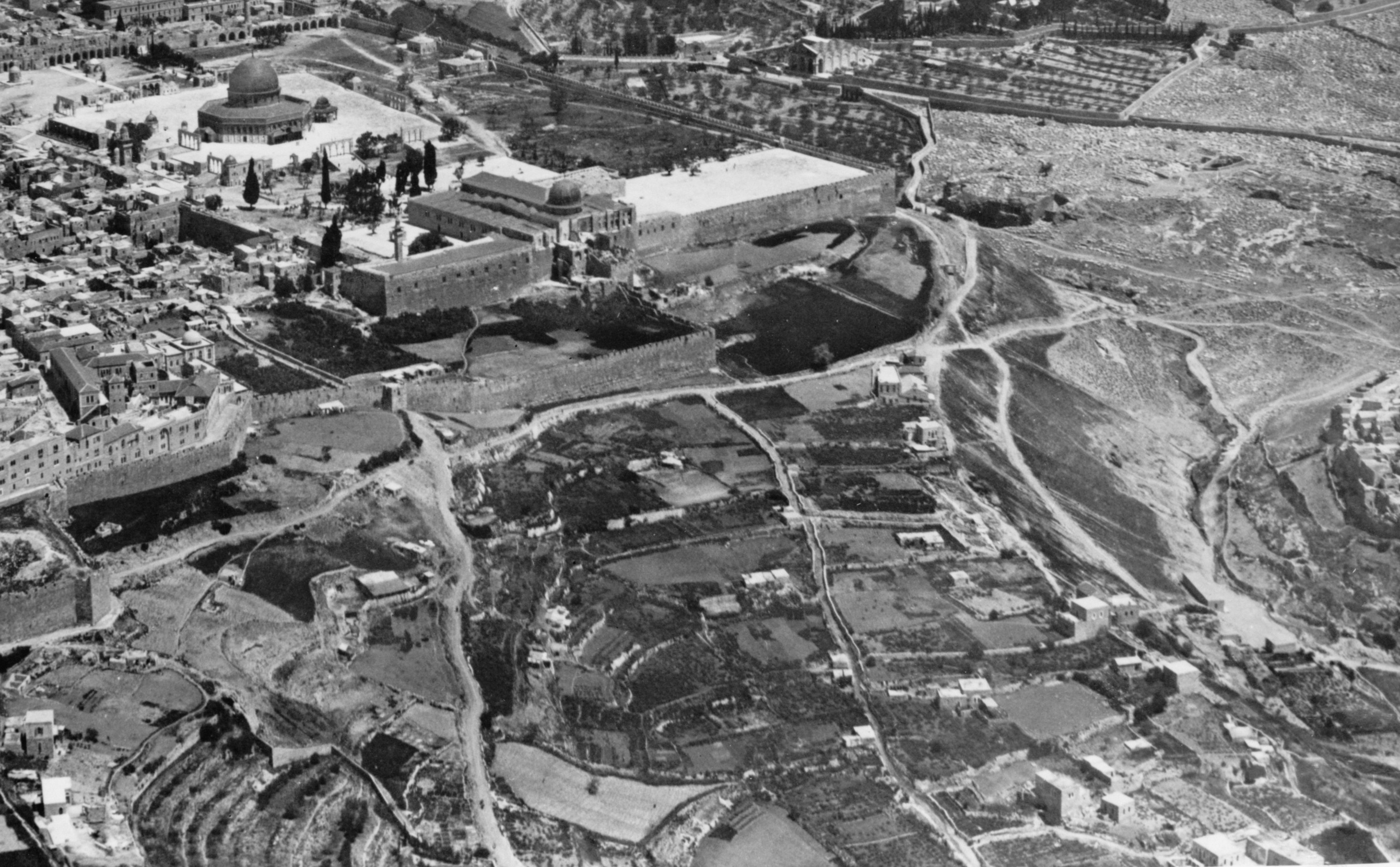
1931

The development of the City of David / Wadi Hilweh area, 1870–1931. A few small buildings can be seen on the hill facing the houses of Silwan in 1870; further houses were constructed in the following decades

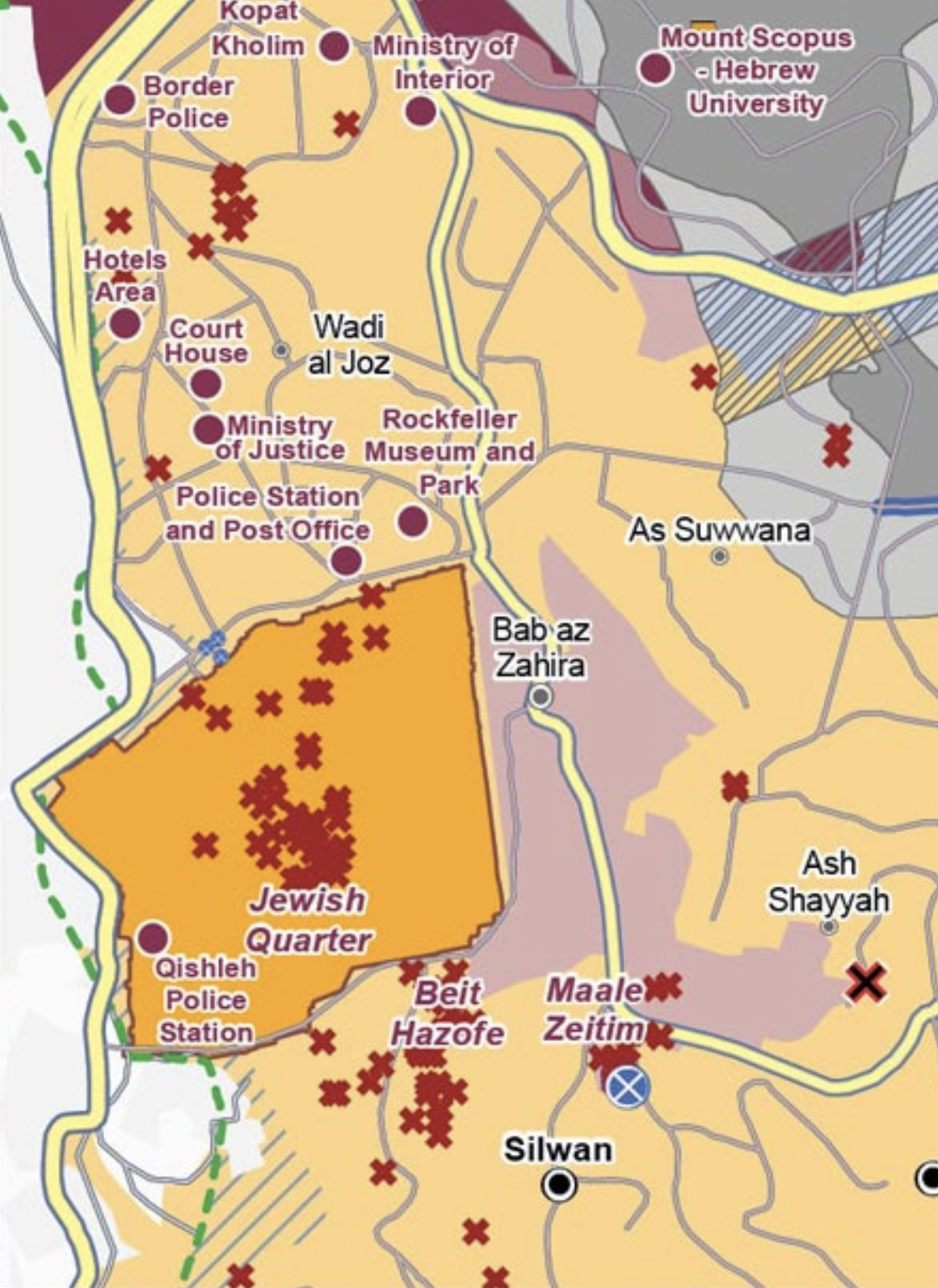
UN map showing the City of David area as a series of Israeli "Inner Settlements" – each represented as red crosses – around "Beit Hazofe" (בית הצופה, "Observation House"), and adjacent to Silwan and Ma'ale HaZeitim.

The area immediately outside the walls of Jerusalem was undeveloped for most of early modern history, with the exception of the village of Silwan. Modern settlement outside of the walls began in the late 19th century. In the Illés Relief, created between 1864 and 1873, there are a few small buildings visible on the hill facing Silwan. In 1873–1874 a member of the notable Jewish Meyuchas family moved to a house towards the bottom of the hill of what has been described as Silwan, but is outside Israel's modern borders of Silwan in what it calls the City of David. The Meyuchas family left the in the 1930s; no other Jewish families are known to have settled in the area during the period.

When archaeological excavation began, the area was referred to as Mount Ophel. In 1911 an amateur archaeologist claimed he had found proof this particular area was the location of the "ancient City of David." The claim led Baron Edmond de Rothschild to purchase land in the area. He directed archaeologist Raymond Weill to investigate the claim, and in 1913 Weill agreed it was the location of the "City of David."

=== Mandatory Palestine ===
The area continued to be known in English as Mount Ophel during the Mandatory Palestine period. Excavations continued during the Mandate period with the site being referred to unofficially by the local government with archaeologists as "City of David." During the later stages of the Mandate era the houses of the nearby Arab village of Silwan expanded across the Kidron Valley and up the ridge of what became Wadi Hilweh.

=== Jordanian period ===
After the 1948 Arab–Israeli War, the whole area fell on the eastern side of the Green Line under Jordanian rule. In 1950, Jordan's Custodian of Enemy confiscated Jewish owned property. Baron Edmond de Rothschild was Jewish, and the confiscation of land he had purchased for archaeological excavations would create problems in future decades. The Jordanian Department of Antiquities continued excavations, announcing a major find from the Jebusite era in 1964. In their archaeological publication, they referred to the "Davidic and Solomonic cities of the Iron Age," but did not use the term "City of David." It was believed at the end of this period that the site "had been picked clean by archeologists over the past century." Prominent British archaeologist Dame Kathleen Kenyon wrote of the three thousand year old city, "Our excavations have revealed little of it. I believe the archaeological evidence for more does not survive.

=== Post 1967 and Israeli settlement ===
Arab families continued to live on the ridge and to build houses there after 1967. From 1968 to 1977, the Israel Exploration Society conducted excavations on the hill that rises to the north of the Wadi Hilweh neighborhood led by Benjamin Mazar and Eilat Mazar. However, it was considered a largely excavated site until the early 1980s. At that point, unexpectedly, a structure was accidentally found that initially appeared to be around the age of the ancient City of David. The discovery marked the start of what had largely been an archaeological dig and minor tourist site turning into a place of angry protests and controversy. Excavation stopped during this period. In 1991, the right wing Ir David Foundation foundation began attempts to claim properties that had been seized by Jordan's Custodian of Enemy property. These could be claimed if the land had not been formally transferred to a new owner. Hundreds of cases were initiated in the area attempting to argue that ownership had of land not been transferred to new owners. Some of these were overturned by the courts and were heavily criticized. According to Israeli NGO Emek Shaveh, most of the land transferred to the Jewish National Fund in 1991 had been bought by Baron Rothschild for archaeological purposes, together with "a very small area" purchased by the 19th century Ottoman Jewish community.

According to Ronny Reich, in 1995 no one else at his university would agree to work at the site. The Ir David Foundation controversially won a contract to run the City of David visitor center. However, after the protests in the 1980s, the legal controversy of the early 1990s, and perhaps in part due to an attack on head of the foundation, it does not appear any public company wanted to run the site. The foundation continued to win contract renewals.

The discovery in 2004 of the Pool of Siloam and what might be the remains of the Palace of King David in 2005, led to a major surge of interest in the area. The sites are of importance to both Judaism and Christianity. The small Wadi Hilweh neighbourhood became the scene of massive archaeological exploration, a growth of hundreds of thousands of tourists annually, and Israeli settler activity. This led to a huge growth of criticism and controversy surrounding the archaeology and the foundation.

It had become embroiled in what archaeologist Raphael Greenberg called "the Israeli national project of unifying Jerusalem and the settler project of breaking Palestinian Jerusalem apart", both of which have "joined to disenfranchise the people living above and among the antiquities".

Greenberg noted that, as of 2014, the local settlers were "a tiny, belligerent minority in Silwan", while the "indigenous [Palestinian] community are deprived of their materiality", calling it a "classic case of residual colonialism".

In October 2014, Uri Ariel, politician from The Jewish Home party and at that time Israeli Minister of Housing and Construction, caused controversy when he suggested he was considering taking up residence in the area.

The area was controversially renamed "City of David" by Israel's Jerusalem municipality..

The project also has strong supporters. In 2025, United States Ambassador to Israel Mike Huckabee said of the project, "Think about the fact that it was hidden for 2000 years, underground, people living their lives on top of it, streets and roads and houses being built above it, nobody understanding that underneath here was maybe the greatest archeological discovery in history."

==== National Parks ====
The Jerusalem Walls National Park was declared in 1974 on "a large part of the neighborhood of Silwan." Other parks in East Jerusalem include Tzurim Valley Park in 2000 and in 2013, Mount Scopus Slopes National Park (located between al-'Esawiyah and a-Tur), and Refa'im Stream National Park (on lands belonging to al-Walaja). These parks were approved on privately owned Palestinian lands and in built-up areas or areas bordering the built-up sections of Palestinian neighborhoods and villages. According to B'Tselem these parks are not meant simply to protect nature, landscape and heritage but are also, "perhaps mainly", meant to promote political agendas. By declaring parts of the city as parks entails no development in these areas and serves the political agenda far better than any municipal restrictions on planning and building.

In 1997, management of the City of David within the park was assumed by the Ir David Foundation (commonly known as Elad). The term "City of David" was used officially from the 1970s onward, following the capture of East Jerusalem by Israel, but today the name with its biblical and political connotations is questioned by some in the archaeological academic community. Since El'Ad took over the management of the park in 1997, 'David's City' has essentially become a religious-nationalist battle cry that has transformed the area from an ordinary Palestinian neighbourhood with a few excavation pits, into a religious settlement and major national biblical monument with hundreds of thousands of visitors a year and an official education site for Israeli school children and soldiers.

Around 70 homes in the Al-Bustan area of Silwan are under threat of demolition. According to Ir Amim plans, the establishment of the King's Garden touristic and archaeological park would extend the City of David southwards to cover the entirety of Al-Bustan and towards the settler enclave in central Silwan (Batan al-Hawa) where the Ateret Cohanim settler organization is active.

After having been run by Elad for three years, management of the Jerusalem Archaeological Park/Davidson Center, south of the Western Wall Plaza, with effect from July 2021, reverted to the government's Company for the Reconstruction and Development of the Jewish Quarter.

==== Development projects ====
A US$60–66 million project to construct a 1.4 km cable-car running from the First Station compound, passing over the neighborhoods of Abu Tor and the Valley of Hinnom, then through the Mount Zion parking lot and ending at the Kedem visitor center in Silwan/City of David was put on hold following a judgement by the Israeli High Court on 24 February 2021. Since 2019, the court has examined multiple petitions against the project, which is closely connected with Elad. The court gave until 22 April to provide a response to the petitions. The court rejected petitions against the project in 2022. However, the project remained stuck due in 2024 over failure to find an international company interested in it.

The Israel Nature and Parks Authority and Elad were planning the construction of a 16,000 m^{2} new large visitor center to accommodate the large increase in tourists to the area. It was to be located on the opposite side of the Wadi Hilweh Street, at the former Givati parking lot, the "Kedem Compound." It was given preliminary approval in April 2014. The project was denounced by UNESCO in October 2016. A series of archaeological discoveries were made at the Givati Parking Lot dig after the initial project approval. As of early 2026, the project has not been able to proceed and the foundation is "still grappling with how best to open up the cramped quarters of the cultic installation to a flood of pilgrims."
