= Jerusalem Walls National Park =

Israeli national park located in occupied East Jerusalem

- גן לאומי סביב חומות ירושלים העתיקה
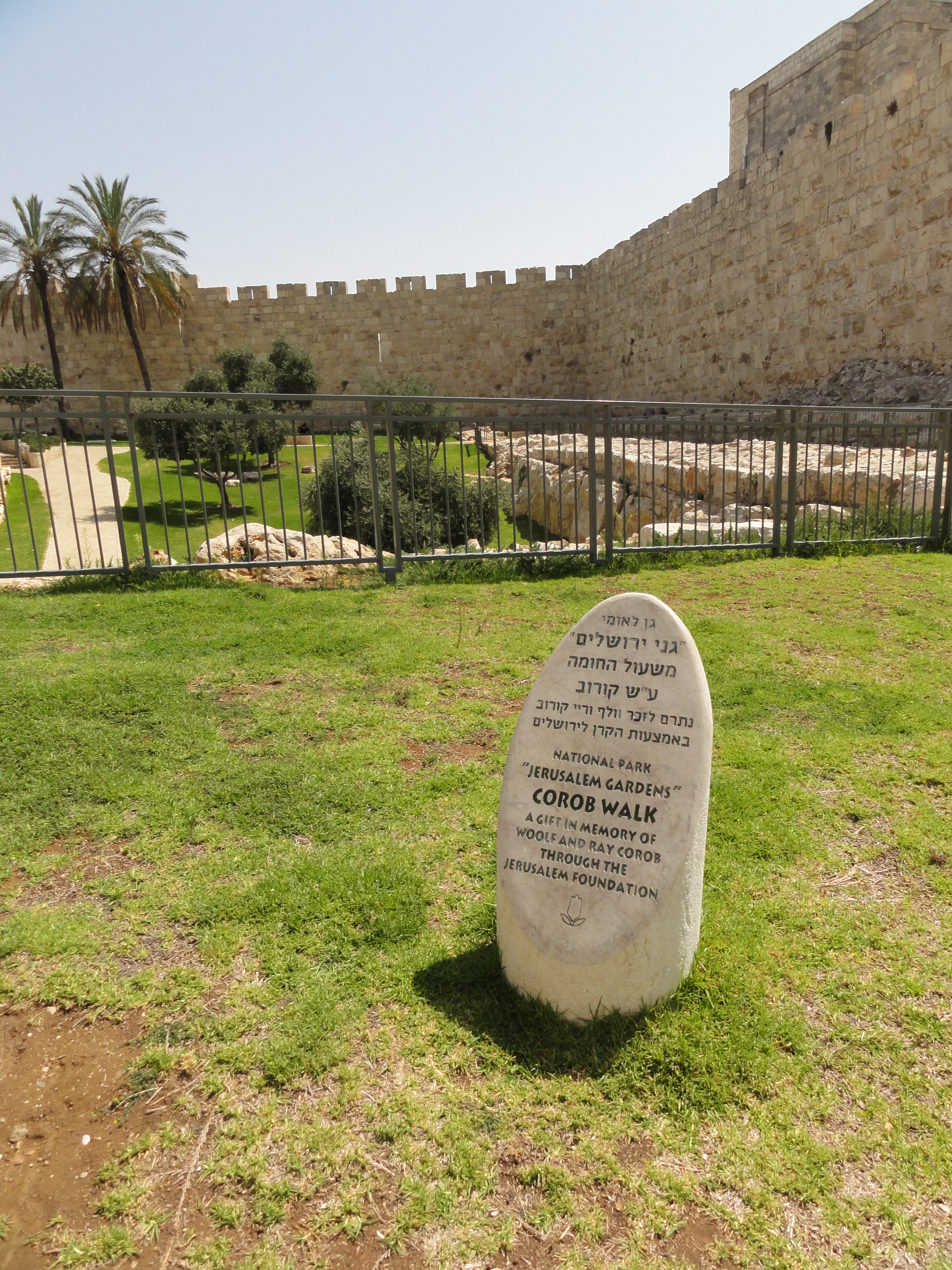
- Corob Walk, one of many segments of the park
- Interactive map of Jerusalem Walls National Park
- Location: Jerusalem, Israel
- Coordinates: 31°46′56.78″N 35°13′51.51″E
- Area: 1,100 dunams (270 acres; 110 ha)
- Established: 31 March 1974

Jerusalem Walls National Park (also known as Jerusalem Walls-City of David National Park) is an Israeli national park which surrounds—but does not include—the ancient walls and gates of the Old City of Jerusalem. Development of the park started soon after Israel gained control of East Jerusalem in 1967, and was meant to create a green belt space around the old city to demarcate the ancient from the modern and prevent development from encroaching too close to the walls.

The national park includes the site of the City of David on the southern end and connects to the Emek Tzurim National Park on the north-east part.

== Development ==
During the three-decades long British rule of the region, five different master plans of Jerusalem were devised, all of which included a green belt area around the walls of the old city. This open space was meant to protect this part of the city and its ancient, spiritual sites from the rapidly developing modern city. Due partially to the required demolition of structures in the planned area, and fear of political unrest that would likely follow, the plans were never implemented under the British.

However, following the Israeli conquest of East Jerusalem during the Six-Day War, the political situation in the city changed. Arieh Dvir, chief landscape architect of Israel's National Park Authority (NPA), quickly revived the plans in the immediate aftermath of the war. Within a few weeks Prime Minister Levi Eshkol had given his approval to Dvir's plan, local master plan number 6 was then approved by planning authorities in April 1969, and the Minister of Interior gave the final required authorization for the park on 31 March 1974. The approval was only for phase one, which included 1,100 dunams (270 acres; 110 ha). Plans, yet unrealized, were made for three phases total, which would include 3,000 dunams (740 acres; 300 ha).

The project ended up being severely underfunded by the government, and Jerusalem's Mayor Teddy Kollek had to rely on Jewish philanthropists providing money through groups like the Jerusalem Foundation to fund construction. The lack of government funds, and the complexity of land ownership, archaeological remains, and religious tension resulted in only isolated sections of the planned park being developed. This fragmented implementation of the plan led to confusion, even over the official name of the park, with various plaques added in different parts of the park and at different stages using different names, including "Jerusalem Gardens National Park." Additionally, Dvir's conceptual plan did not include details, so various landscape architectural teams were given responsibility for developing the different segments, based on his guidelines.

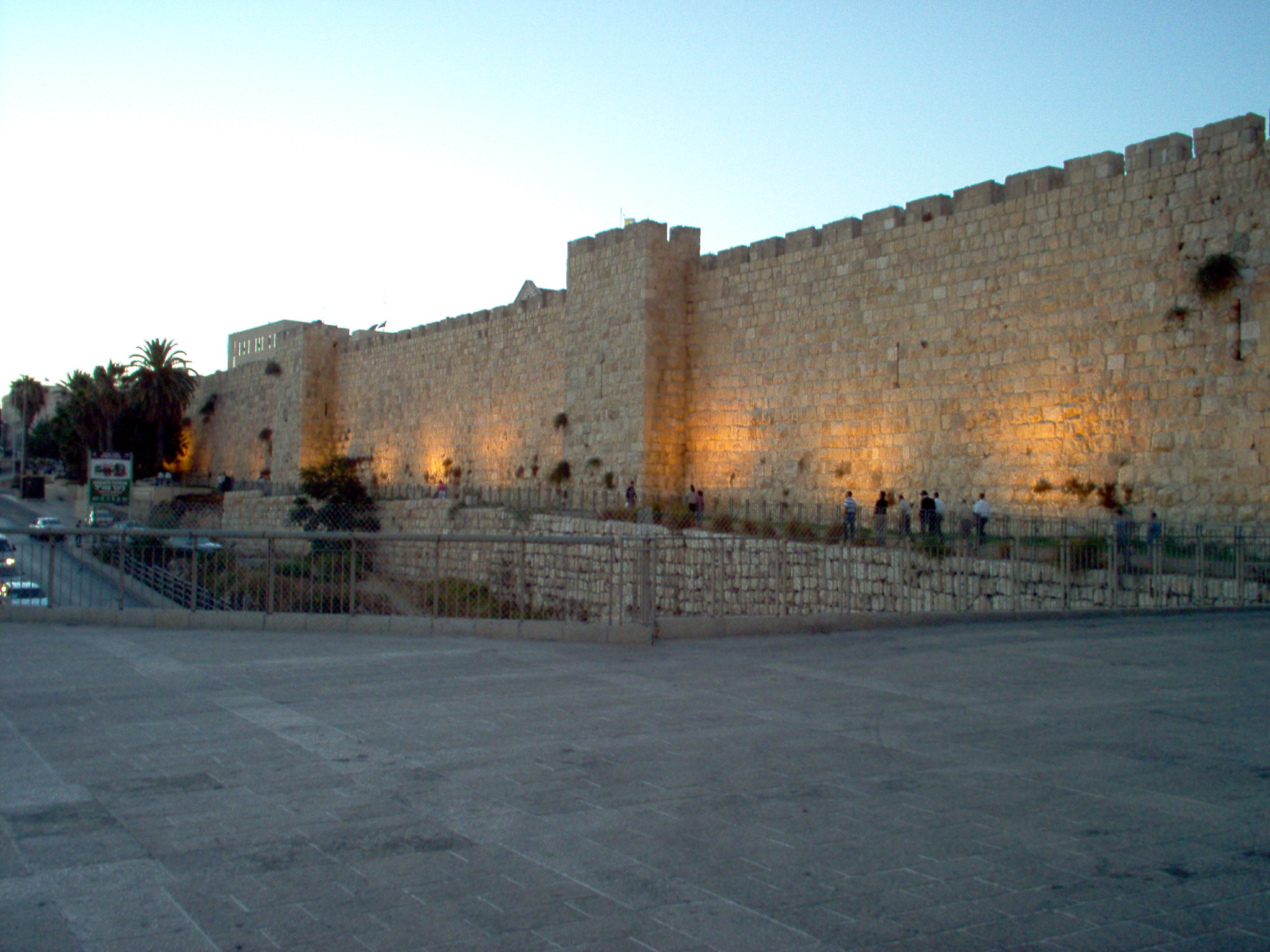
The old city walls near the Jaffa Gate.

The development of the park has not been without controversy, most especially regarding the Wadi Hilweh neighborhood of Silwan, a predominantly Palestinian area of the city. Here tensions remain, given the ever-expanding excavations at the City of David site. In the early 2020s, Israel's Nature and Parks Authority announced plans to expand the park onto the slopes of the Mount of Olives, near several sites that are holy to Christianity. Christian leaders expressed fear this would damage the religious sites and violate the status quo and in early 2022 the Authority put the plans on hold.

== Sites located in the National Park ==
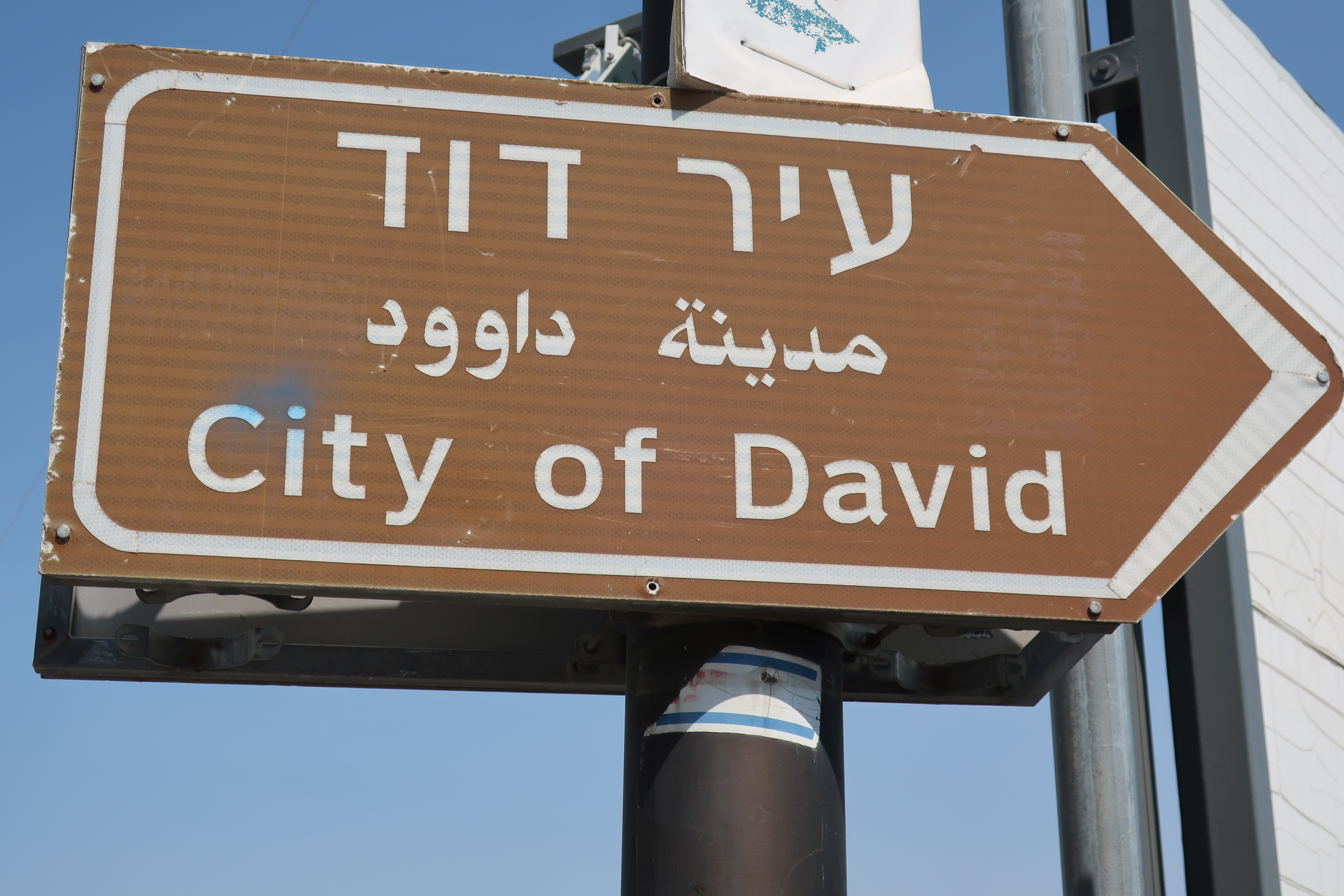
Signpost directing to the City of David Visitor Center

The walls and promenade of the Old City of Jerusalem are not included in the boundaries of the park. However, several archeological sites, parks and gardens are found within its borders, some of the features include:

- City of David – archaeological and tourism site
- Mount Zion – includes David's Tomb, the Holocaust chamber and several holy sites for Christians, among them the Hagia Maria Sion Abbey, the Cathedral of St. James and more
- Ophel Garden/Jerusalem Archaeological Park
- Tower of David – consists of a museum for the History of Jerusalem and an antiquities site
- Cemeteries:
  - Jewish
  - Christian Orthodox
  - Protestant (Mount Zion Cemetery)
- Gardens and parks:
  - Mitchell Park and Sultan's Pool
  - Wolfson Park

As the National Park was being developed, a number of parks and gardens were created in conjunction with the Jerusalem Foundation, such as Liberty Bell Park and Orson Hyde Memorial Garden, which were noted as being part of the park, although they fall outside its official boundaries.

== Archaeology ==
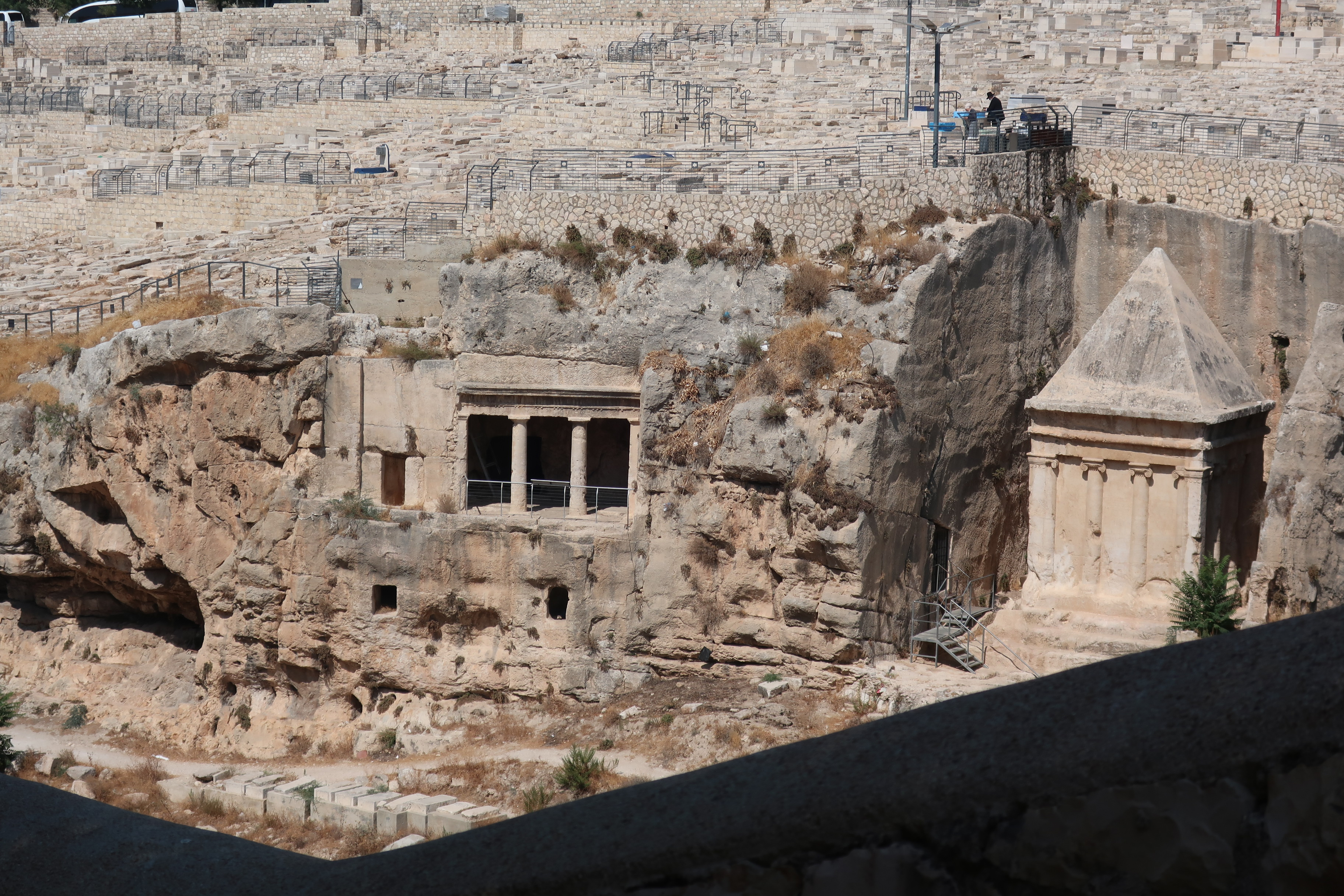
Zechariah's Tomb

The national park consists of important archaeological sites as well as the Ophel Garden/Jerusalem Archaeological Park, which includes archaeological finds from the Solomon's Temple period until the Ottoman period.

The eastern side of the garden includes a Muslim cemetery.

West and south of the Old City is Gehenna.

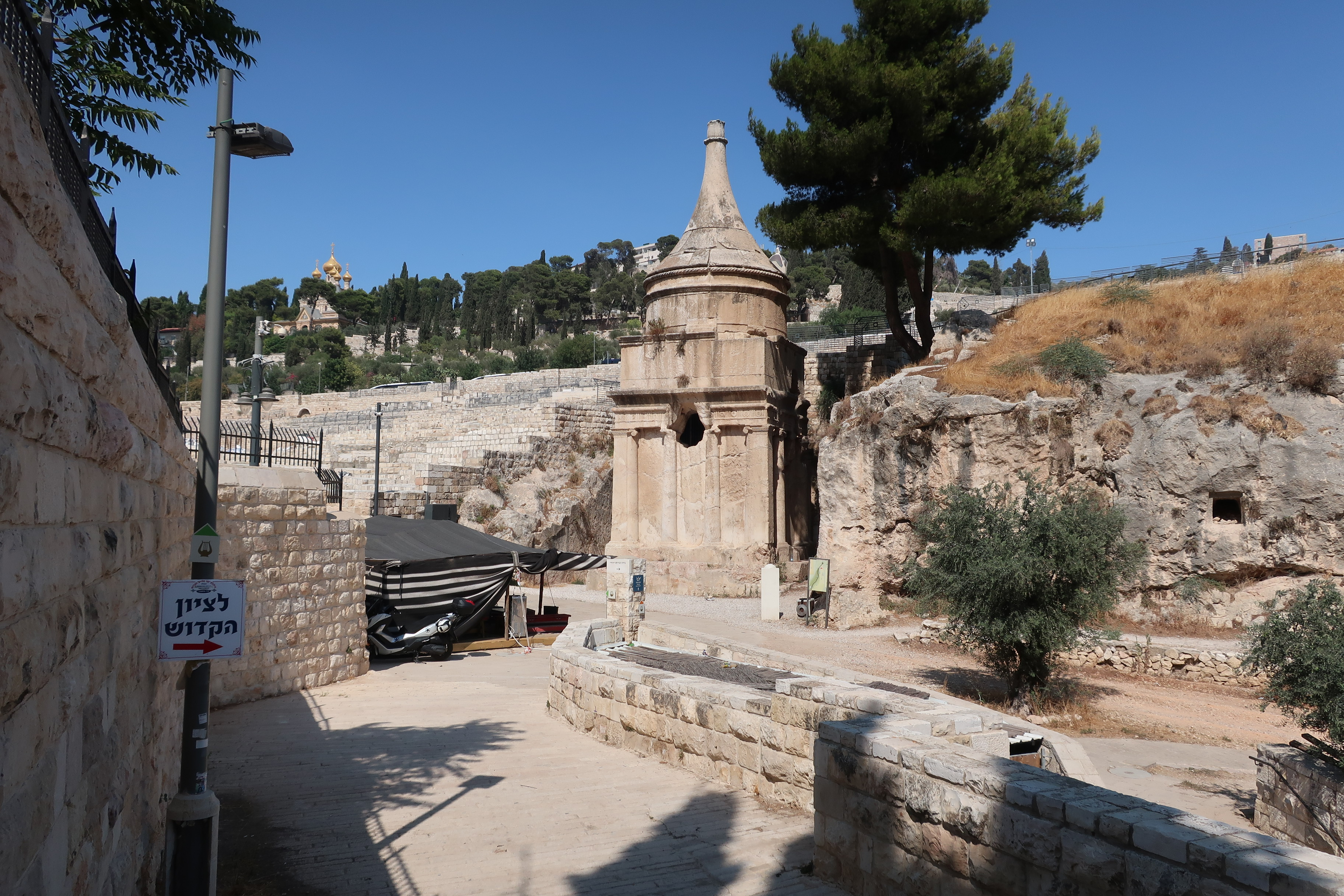
Absalom's Memorial

The Kidron Valley which is also located on the grounds of the National Park consists of a number of burial constructions, including Tomb of Absalom and Tomb of Zechariah.

Under the northern wall, between the Damascus Gate and Herod's Gate, is a site called Zedekiah's Cave. Researchers believe that this was a quarry from Herod's period.

== See also ==
- Gates of the Old City of Jerusalem
- Walls of Jerusalem

== Bibliography ==
- Wilkof, Shira; Nitzan-Shiftan, Alona (2023). "Holy green: Silwan, design knowledge, and the 1967 making of Jerusalem's Old City Walls National Park". Planning Perspectives. 38 (5). Routledge: 1079–1102. doi:10.1080/02665433.2023.2173278.
- Wilkof, Shira; Nitzan-Shiftan, Alona (2017). "הזדמנות היסטורית: נוף, ממלכתיות ותחרות בהקמת הגן הלאומי סובב חומות ירושלים" [Historical Opportunity: Landscape, Statism, and Competition in the Making of the Walls of Jerusalem National Park, 1967–1969] (PDF). קתדרה [Cathedra] (in Hebrew) (163). Yad Ben Zvi: 163–190.
