= Meyuchas =

Jerusalem Sephardi family of rabbis and merchants

Meyuchas family מיוחס
- Current region: Jerusalem
- Origin: Spain before the Alhambra Decree
- Connected members: Raphael Meyuchas ben Samuel; Moshe Yosef Mordechai Meyuchas

The Meyuchas (Meyuhas, Meyouhas) are a Jerusalem Sephardi family that has produced influential rabbis and merchants for hundreds of years. They trace their ancestry to Spain before the Alhambra Decree.

Modern settlement on the site of the City of David began in 1873-74 when the Meyuchas family moved a short distance outside the city walls to a newly built house on the ridge.

Raphael Meyuchas ben Samuel (1695?-1771) was born in Jerusalem and was the brother of Abraham ben Samuel Meyuchas and the father of Moses Joseph Mordechai Meyuchas. Served as Rishon l'Zion from 1756 until his death in 1771. He is known to have attempted to bring about some kind of reconciliation with the Karaites and to have admitted Karaite children to the Jewish school. He was the author of ‘Minchat Bikkurim (Salonika, 1752) a commentary on the Talmud, and of Peri ha-Adamah, (four parts, Salonika 1752-57), a commentary on the Mishneh Torah of Maimonides.

Abraham ben Samuel Meyuchas (died 1767) - Born in Jerusalem. Authored a commentary on the Torah, Sedeh ha-Eretz (three parts, Salonika, 1784,1789, Livorno 1788) of Diglo Ahavah, a commentary on the Derech Etz ha-Chaim of Isaac Luria.

Moshe Yosef Mordechai Meyuchas (Moses Joseph Mordechai Meyuchas) (1738-1805) - born in Jerusalem. Served as Rishon l’Zion from 1802-1805. He is the author of Sha’ar ha-Mayim (Salonika, 1768), Berachot Mayim (Salonika, 1789), and Mayin Shaal (Salonika 1799).
