= Company for the Reconstruction and Development of the Jewish Quarter =

Israeli state-owned organization

- Native name: החברה לשיקום ולפיתוח הרובע היהודי
- Romanized name: ha-Ḥevrah le-shiḳum u-fituaḥ ha-rovaʻ ha-Yehudi ba-ʻir ha-ʻatiḳah bi-Yerushalayim
- Type: Ltd.
- Industry: Historic preservation
- Founded: 1968–1969
- Founder: Ministry of Construction
- Headquarters: Batei Mahse, Jerusalem
- Website: travelrova.co.il

The Company for the Reconstruction and Development of the Jewish Quarter (Hebrew: החברה לשיקום ולפיתוח הרובע היהודי) is a state-owned enterprise established in 1968 to restore the Jewish Quarter in the Old City of Jerusalem and develop it to become a national, religious, historical, and cultural site. In the 1980s, the company completed the refurbishment and reconstruction of the Jewish Quarter. Although it was supposed to close once its initial goal was complete, as of 2021, the company continues to operate under the jurisdiction of the Ministry of Jerusalem and Heritage.

== Founding and early history ==
Among the lands expropriated by Israel in April 1968 was the Jewish Quarter in the Old City of Jerusalem, which covers an area of about 134 dunams. This includes both the Western Wall area and the surrounding buildings. In July 1968, the government decided to establish the Company as a state-controlled enterprise, and it was formally founded by January 1969.

The quarter is located in an area administered by the Israel Land Administration. In 1970, the administration leased the quarter to a company under a primary lease. The company subleased the residential buildings to those who were occupying the quarter. From its establishment until 1985, the company reinvigorated the dilapidated state of the Jewish Quarter, building 500 apartments, 100 shops, and several public buildings.

== Repopulation of the district ==
In its initial years, the company allocated apartments to citizens according to predetermined criteria for residency. In 1971, the company established an occupancy committee composed of members of the company's board of directors and employees. The occupancy policy stated that those who could be eligible to reside in the Old City are either:

1. An Israeli citizen who resided in the country prior to 1967 who has served in the IDF
2. New immigrants to Israel who have gained citizenship and were not in the country at the time of conscription for the 1948 or 1967 wars.

The population policy was planned strategically, and at the time the population had consisted of around half secularized Jews and half National religious Jews. However, beginning in the 1980s, the quarter became a desirable area among ultra-Orthodox and other religious families.

=== High Court of Justice Muhammad Saeed Burqan ===
Arab non-Jews living in the Jewish Quarter were removed from the area under eminent domain for financial compensation, with many moving to Abu Dis, a Palestinian town in the Jerusalem Governorate. Muhammed Sa'id Burqan, an Arab evicted from his home who moved to Beit Hanina, petitioned the Supreme Court of Israel to gain rights to his past property back, and was rejected by decision of Haim Cohn, who stated:

The need to restore the Jewish Quarter arose only because the Jordanian army invaded it and expelled the Jews, robbed them of their property, and destroyed their homes. Naturally, the restoration came in order to restore the crown of Jewish settlement in the Old City to its previous state, so that the Jews would once again have, as in the past, a quarter unique to them, near the Muslim Quarter, Christian Quarter, and Armenian Quarter. There is no wrongful discrimination in the unique circumstances of these quarters and its community. — HCJ 114/78 Muhammad Sa'id Burqan v. Minister of Finance, Company for the Reconstruction and Development of the Quarter, Minister of Housing P.D. Lev (2) 800

The decision of the Supreme Court backed the actions of the company and the Israeli government, and was essentially a blessing to continue the mission of the company to restore the Jewish Quarter as a place of residency for the people of Israel.

=== Activity outside the Jewish Quarter ===
Since the early 1990s, the company has mainly focused on maintenance within the quarter, including cleaning and preservation of preexisting structures, as well as management and development of archaeological sites. In addition, contrary to the established principle of its dedication to the Jewish Quarter, the company also began construction and maintenance in other quarters of the city, mainly the Muslim Quarter. One such example is the Galicia Courtyard, located on a rooftop in the Muslim Quarter which is maintained by the Custodian General of the Ministry of Justice, and the company has a contract from the Custodian to develop, clean, and maintain the area occupied.

=== Sale of Western Wall Plaza ===
In 2000, it was revealed in an exposé by Globes that in July 1999, the company had sold part of the Western Wall Plaza to "Ezrat Menachem" association. The sale was carried out in a quiet auction. The stated association was the only organization to put in a bid for the land, and according to the contract signed, they were entitled to build a large visitor center in the plaza, which would also serve as a Beit midrash and a private venue hall. Senior officials allegedly knew about the deal for a long time, but had kept the sale out of public knowledge. Later, it was revealed that the heads of the association were diamond magnate Lev Leviev, head of Colel Chabad Shalom Duchman, Chabad rabbi Adin Steinsaltz, and Shmuel Slavin, Israeli Minister of Finance. Israeli Land Administration Director General Avi Drechsler fought to cancel the deal, arguing that it deviated from the mission of the organization, which was to preserve it as a national, religious, historical, and cultural site. He argued that selling government assets to third parties for profit violated the purpose of the company, and his position was accepted by the legal office of the then-Prime Minister, Ehud Barak, who put a freeze on the proceedings for the deal's implementation. Regardless of the previous decision, it was revealed that in the 1990s, the company sold four other sites of historical value to private entities, three of which were sold to ultra-Orthodox organizations, which used them to run Talmud Torahs.

== Company projects ==
The company has undergone many individual projects since its initial goal was complete, and has also worked on many minor renovations that have been necessary in the past few decades. Tiferet Yisrael Synagogue in Jerusalem, for example, is one of a few buildings that was part of a 2019 grant of 200 million shekels ($55 million USD) to the organization for the upkeep of historical buildings in the Jewish Quarter.

=== Parking lots ===
The original grand plan for the quarter from the 1970s included a plan to build a parking lot with four levels and a commercial building on top of it. According to the plan, access to the parking lot would be through a tunnel dug under the walls of the Old City, near Zion Gate. It would contain about 1,300 parking spaces for private cars and a separate area for transportation buses. After a long lawsuit with Society for the Protection of Nature in Israel, which feared destruction of archaeological sites and damage to the walls of the Old City, the original plan was scrapped. A later plan included part of the area being leveled for aparking lot with about 200 spaces, which operated without a business license for decades. In 2001, the Jerusalem Municipality filed an indictment against the company for operating the space without a license. In 2003, the Jerusalem Local Affairs Court ruled the company could no longer legally operate the parking lot. In 2007, the matter was settled.

In November 2004, the company's board of directors approved a plan to build a multi-level underground parking lot of 18,000 square meters, which would include a combined mix of residential and commercial areas, although the project never came to fruition. In 2015, Itai Bezalel, the incoming CEO, announced that a new plan was in the works with an underground parking lot for 600 parking spaces, along with the construction of 150 hotel rooms for tourists to the area.

=== Hurva Synagogue ===
The company engaged in a project for the restoration of the Hurva Synagogue, which was built at the beginning of the 18th century and served as a center of religious activities for the Jews in Eretz Yisrael during the Ottoman Period of occupation. The building was destroyed in the 1948 Palestine war while being occupied by the Jordanian army. After the Six-Day War, proposals were made to restore the synagogue or to construct another one entirely. In the end, no proposal was decided on and the ruins sat until a 21st-century initiative to restore it, which was completed by the company in 2010.

=== Church of the Nea Vaults ===
The southern part of the Jewish Quarter contains the remnants of the 6th-century Nea Church at excavated sites. In the area of residential buildings outside the lind of the old city wall, there lie the remains of the church, which contained retaining vaults, which are divided into six tall, plastered halls that rest on massive pillars. At the op of the southern wall lays an inscription in Greek indicating its establishment by Emperor Justinian I. In the 1980s, the company developed the vaults as an archaeological tourism site. They were renovated and structurally strengthened, and an amphitheater was built above them. Due to the opposition by ultra-Orthodox Jews of building an amphitheater near a Christian site, the surface was mostly installed with a garden and playgrounds. The place is called the "Garden of Resurrection", and contains sports facilities as well. Since then, the Near Church has been closed and is not accessible to the public.

There have been multiple calls by organizations to reopen the site due to its historical and cultural significance, such as by Emek Shaveh, an Israeli archaeology NGO.

=== Jerusalem Archaeological Park ===
Jerusalem Archaeological Park, also known as Ophel Garden, is an aerchaeological site located in the northern Ophel of Jerusalem, at the foot of the Temple Mount's Southern Wall, and includes Davidison Center Museum. The garden has ancient archaeological finds from the Bronze Age, and even includes finds from up to the Ottoman rule of Israel. While previously managed by Elad, it has been managed by the company since 2021.

== Attempts at dissolution ==
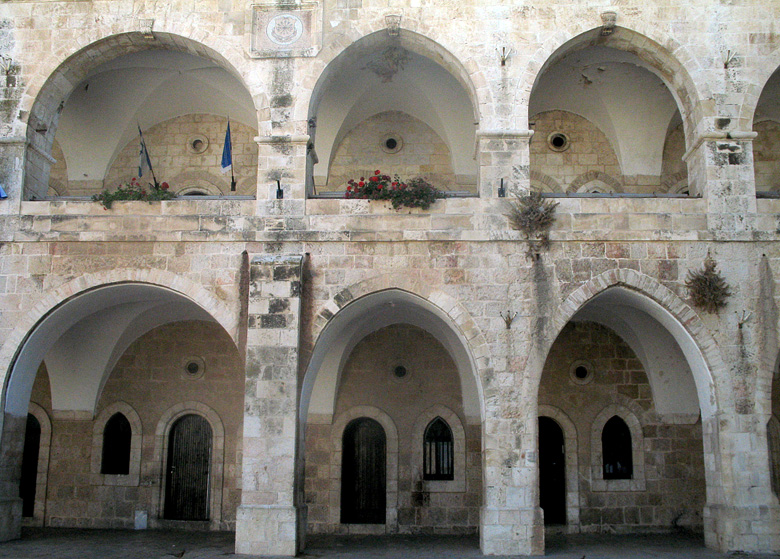
The Rothschild House at Batei Mahse, the current headquarters of the company

Before the full completion of the initial project by the company, in 1982 the State Audit Committee recommended the government merge the company with two others engaged in similar activity to conserve manpower and increase efficiency, the East Jerusalem Development Company and the Karta Company. In January 1983, the Knesset plenary session approved the consensus of the State Audit Committee, but the decision never went into effect. The Government Companies Authority intermittently discussed the future of the company for a long time without reaching any definite consensus. The inaction of the government was criticized by 1980s comptroller Miriam Ben-Porat.

In 2000, Knesset member Ophir Pines-Paz supported a motion to dissolve the company following the scandal surrounding the sale of the Western Wall Plaza, but did not garner enough support to act on it. 4 years later, the chairman of the State Audit Committee asked Prime Minister Ariel Sharon to deal with the merger implementation proposed by the Knesset, although their request was never fulfilled. August of that year saw Minister Tzipi Livni propose that an agreement be signed between the company and a government agency, and a revised draft was submitted to the Cabinet Secretariat for government approval, which wished that the role of managing company be assigned to a government tourism organization, stating that since the original purpose of the company had been fulfilled, the remaining duties could be managed under a preexisting organization. The proposal was never voted on by the government.

"Thus, after more than 23 years since the Knesset decided to approve the recommendations of the State Audit Committee to merge the companies, and 14 years after the State Comptroller's report on this matter was published, no suitable way has yet been found to dissolve the company or an alternative that will allow its continued existence." — 2005 State Comptroller Report

Another recommendation by the State Audit Committee in October 2009 proposed to dissolve the company, while leaving authority to manage and maintain public national assets in the hands of some government agency. The committee hoped to see a target date for liquidation by January 2013:

"The State Audit Committee again recommends that the government dissolve its company... in its current form. The committee recommends that by January 2013, the companies be dissolved from their positions and their functions gradually transferred to the municipality. The government must find solutions to preserve the assets that will remain in the hands of a state-owned company." — Meeting of the State Audit Committee - Wednesday, October 28, 2009, remarks by Chairman MK Otniel Schneller

As of January 2024, the company is still in operation and has not moved forth with any of the dissolutions proposed by various departments of the government of Israel.
