= Raphael Meyuchas ben Shmuel =

Chief Rabbi of Israel from 1756 to 1771

- רפאל מיוחס בן שמואל
- Preceded by: Isaac HaKohen Rapoport
- Succeeded by: Haim Yosef David Azulai

Personal details
- Born: c. 1695 Jerusalem, Ottoman Palestine
- Died: 1771 Jerusalem, Ottoman Palestine
- Children: Moshe Yosef Mordechai Meyuchas
- Relatives: Avraham ben Shmuel Meyuchas (brother)
- Occupation: Chief Rabbi (Rishon l’Zion)
- Known for: Chief Rabbi of Israel (1756–1771)

Raphael Meyuchas ben Shmuel (Hebrew: רפאל מיוחס בן שמואל; 1695?-1771) served as Chief Rabbi of Israel (Rishon l’Zion) from 1756 until his death in 1771.

Meyuchas was born in Jerusalem to the Meyuchas family. His brother was Avraham ben Shmuel Meyuchas. His son was Moshe Yosef Mordechai Meyuchas.

Meyuchas attempted to negotiate a reconciliation between the Karaites and other Jews, and tried to gain admission to Jewish schools for Karaite children. His books include Minchat Bikkurim (Salonika, 1752) a commentary on the Talmud, and Peri ha-Adamah, (Salonika 1752–57, 4 volumes) a commentary on Maimonides's Mishneh Torah.
