= Beit Haliba Excavations =

Archaeological excavation site in Jerusalem's Old City

A "four-room house" style dwelling discovered during archaeological excavations beneath the Western Wall Plaza in Jerusalem.

The Beit Haliba Excavations (also known as the Western Wall Plaza Excavations) refer to a major archaeological excavation conducted in the western portion of the Western Wall Plaza in the Old City of Jerusalem. Conducted by the Israel Antiquities Authority (IAA) prior to the planned construction of the "Beit Haliba" visitor and educational center, the dig uncovered a continuous sequence of archaeological remains spanning over 2,500 years, from the First Temple period to the modern era.

== Overview and Location ==
The excavation site is located in the western portion of the Western Wall Plaza, within the Jewish Quarter of Jerusalem's Old City, approximately 100 meters west of the Western Wall itself.

The archaeological project was undertaken ahead of the planned construction of "Beit Haliba" (House of the Core), a multi-story building proposed by the Western Wall Heritage Foundation. Designed as a visitor and administrative center, the complex was intended to host educational programs, interactive displays, classrooms, and administrative facilities for tourists and worshipers visiting the Western Wall. Because the project was situated within a historically rich zone, Israeli antiquities law mandated comprehensive salvage excavations prior to any subterranean construction.

== History of Excavations ==
Excavations at the site began in 2005 as a large-scale salvage operation mandated by Israeli antiquities law prior to construction in historic zones. The dig was conducted by the Israel Antiquities Authority (IAA) and funded by the Western Wall Heritage Foundation.

Led by IAA archaeologists Dr. Shlomit Weksler-Bdolah and Alexander Onn, along with Brigitte Ouahnouna and Shua Kisilevitz, the team systematically excavated the area down to the natural bedrock. Due to the extreme density of archaeological strata and the site's proximity to the Temple Mount, the dig extended over several years. This systematic work provided researchers with a rare, intact stratigraphic column documenting continuous urban life in the heart of Jerusalem across two and a half millennia.

== Archaeological Findings ==
The excavations revealed a continuous archaeological record spanning over 2,500 years. The site provided valuable insights into the urban planning and daily life of Jerusalem across multiple historic periods.

=== First Temple Period (8th–6th Centuries BCE) ===
The deepest layers reached bedrock and yielded significant architectural and administrative remains from the Kingdom of Judah:

- Structures and Rock-Cut Chambers: Remains of solid stone walls and rock-cut rooms indicating a developed residential and administrative district on the Western Hill of ancient Jerusalem.
- Administrative Artifacts: Numerous stamped jar handles, pottery vessels, and clay seal impressions (bullae). Among the most notable discoveries was a 2,700-year-old clay seal impression bearing the inscription "belonging to the governor of the city" (sar ha’ir in Ancient Hebrew script), confirming the existence of a high-ranking civic official mentioned in the Hebrew Bible.

=== Second Temple Period (1st Century BCE – 1st Century CE) ===
Occupational strata from the Hasmonean and Herodian periods reflected the area's close proximity to the Temple Mount complex:

- Residential Units and Ritual Baths: Structural foundations of private dwellings accompanied by stone-cut ritual baths (mikva'ot) and water cisterns.
- Artifacts: High quantities of limestone vessels, which were commonly used due to Jewish purity laws during this era, alongside coinage and imported table wares.

=== Roman Period (Aelia Capitolina, 2nd–4th Centuries CE) ===
Following the destruction of Jerusalem in 70 CE, the Romans established Aelia Capitolina, significantly altering the city’s urban grid:

- The Eastern Cardo: A well-preserved 11-meter-wide paved colonnaded street running north-to-south. The street was constructed of large limestone slabs laid diagonally, flanked by open-front shops and sidewalk arcades.
- Public Infrastructure: Subterranean drainage channels and architectural elements, including decorative capitals and column bases, showcasing Roman monumental engineering.

=== Byzantine, Early Islamic, and Later Periods (5th–19th Centuries CE) ===
The site maintained continuous urban occupation through medieval and early modern times:

- Byzantine and Early Islamic: Structures utilizing recycled Roman architectural stones, residential complex foundations, and industrial facilities.
- Mamluk and Ottoman Periods: Vaulted subterranean halls, complex water networks, and structural foundations that formed part of the historic Maghrebi Quarter (Harat al-Maghariba) prior to its demolition in 1967.

== Controversy and Planning Debate ==
The proposed construction of the "Beit Haliba" center and the extensive excavations associated with it triggered intense public, political, and professional debates.

=== Architectural and Spatial Impact ===
Prominent Israeli architects, urban planners, and public figures argued that erecting a substantial, modern multi-story building within the Western Wall Plaza would disrupt the historic open landscape and alter the traditional character of the site. Critics expressed concern that the building would visually dominate the plaza and obstruct views toward the Old City's historic quarters.

=== Heritage and Conservation Concerns ===
Archaeologists and heritage experts raised questions regarding the preservation of the exposed archaeological remains. While proponents maintained that the building's foundations were designed to incorporate and showcase the findings, conservationists argued that significant features—particularly the Roman Eastern Cardo—should remain fully exposed as an open-air archaeological park rather than being enclosed beneath a modern facility.

=== Political and Security Considerations ===
Due to the site's extreme geopolitical sensitivity and its proximity to the Temple Mount (Al-Aqsa compound), the project drew international scrutiny. In 2015, amid heightened regional tensions, Israeli Prime Minister Benjamin Netanyahu temporarily froze the construction plans for Beit Haliba to mitigate security and diplomatic concerns.

== Current Status ==
Following the completion of the primary excavation seasons, plans for the Beit Haliba building underwent multiple modifications in response to legal challenges and public objections. While active subterranean construction on the proposed building was paused at various points, the archaeological findings—most notably the preserved sections of the Roman Eastern Cardo—have been integrated into visitor itineraries and public displays managed in proximity to the Western Wall Plaza.
