= Emek Tzurim National Park =

Israeli national park located in occupied East Jerusalem

- עמק צורים
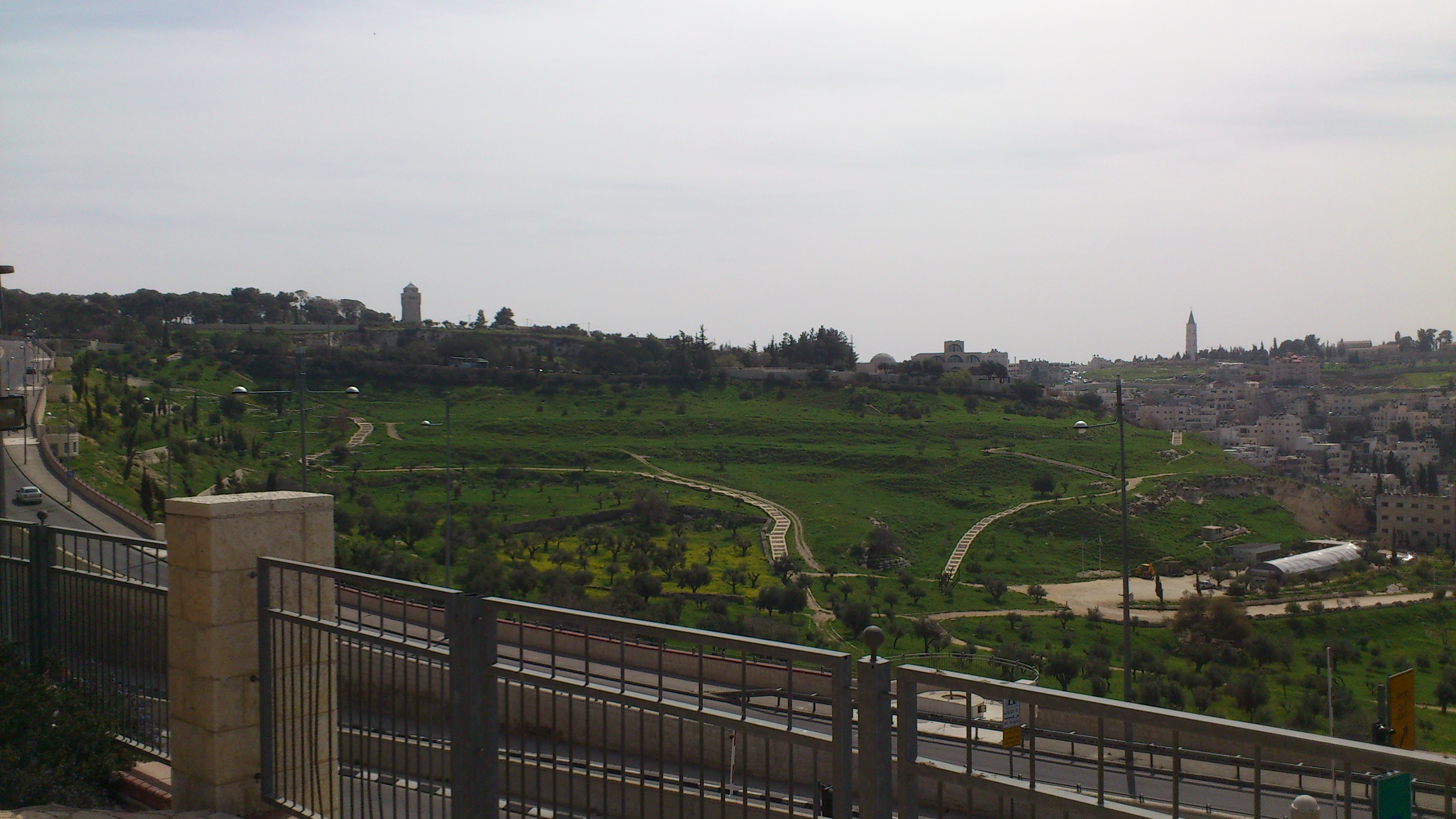
- Interactive map of Emek Tzurim National Park
- Coordinates: 31°47′22″N 35°14′36″E
- Area: 170,000 square metres

Emek Tzurim National Park (Hebrew: עמק צורים, lit. Valley of Flints) is a national park in East Jerusalem.

== Location ==
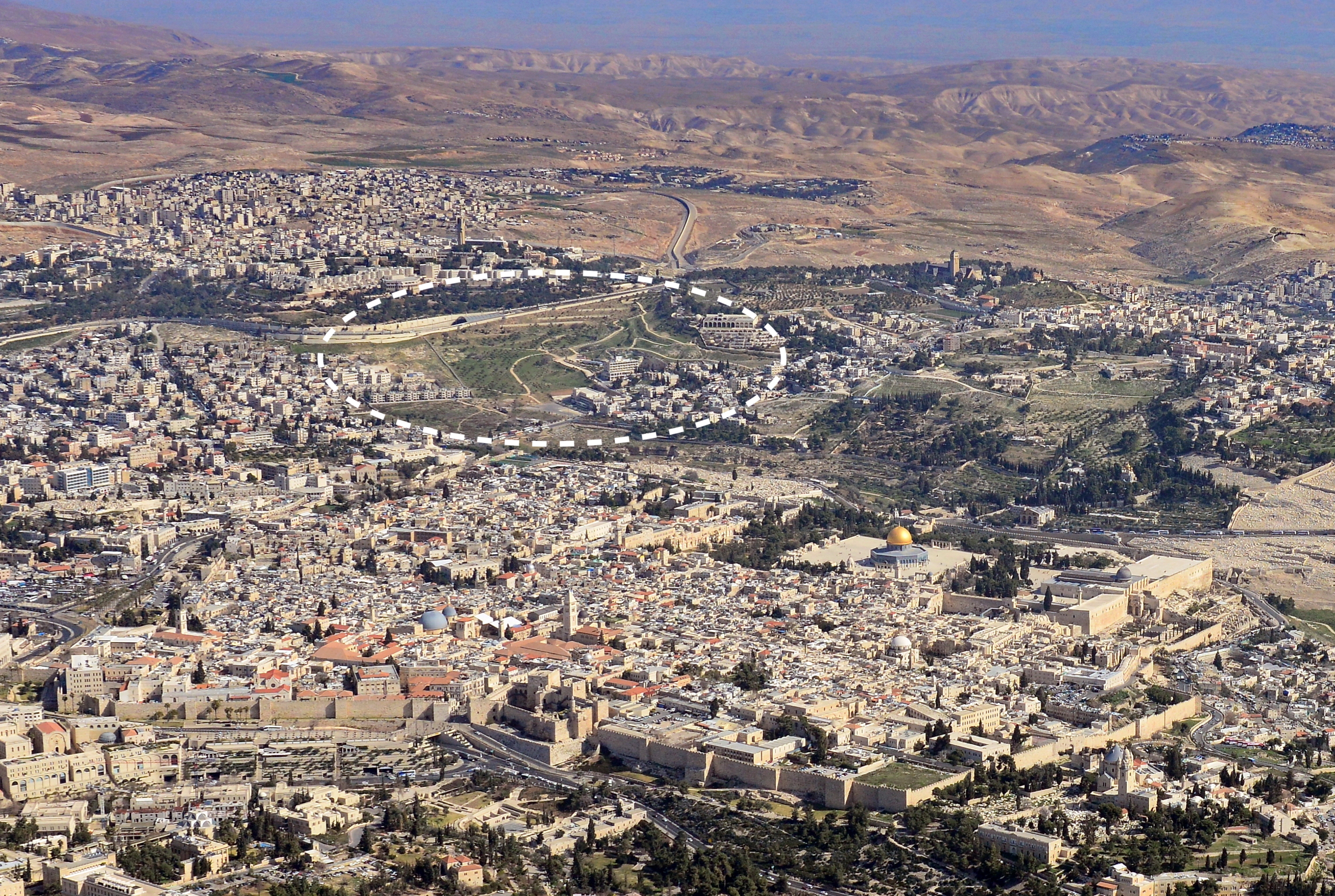
Location of Emek Tzurim park

Emek Tzurim National Park is located on the lower western slope of the Mount of Olives and Mount Scopus and the upper reaches of the Kidron Valley. It abuts the neighborhoods of Wadi al-Joz, At-Tur and Beit Orot, as well as the campus of Brigham Young University Jerusalem Center. On its northern side, the Park borders Highway 1 and is overlooked by the Hebrew University of Jerusalem Mount Scopus campus. The grounds cover 170,000 square meters.

== Temple Mount Sifting Project ==
In 2004—2017, the park housed the Temple Mount Sifting Project, where visitors participate in sifting soil from the Temple Mount in search of archaeological artifacts. When this project moved to a different locale, the facility was renamed the Ancient Jerusalem Sifting Project and engages in sifting finds from other archaeological excavations in Jerusalem.

== See also ==
- National parks and nature reserves of Israel
