= Jerusalem Archaeological Park =

Archaeological park in East Jerusalem

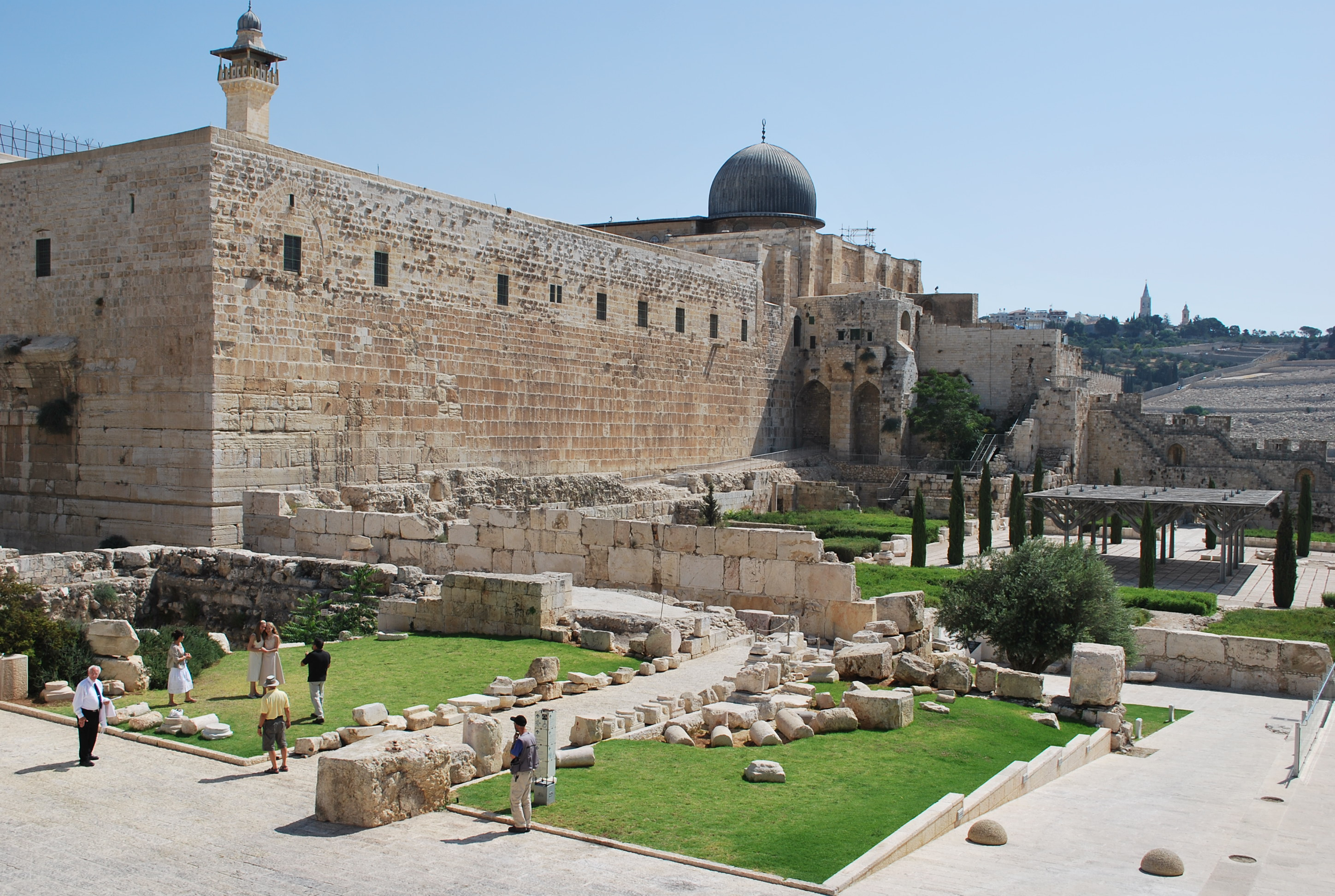

- Location within Old City of Jerusalem
- 31°46′31″N 35°14′06″E
- Cultures: Ancient Israel; Second Temple Judaism; Roman Empire; Byzantine Empire; Umayyad Caliphate
- Satellite of: Company for the Reconstruction and Development of the Jewish Quarter
- Location: Old City of Jerusalem

Site notes
- Excavation dates: Various from 1860s-present
- Archaeologists: Charles Warren; Benjamin Mazar; Ronny Reich; Eilat Mazar
- Website: https://travelrova.co.il/language/en/the-archeological-garden-davidson-center-2/

Jerusalem Archaeological Park, also known as Ophel Garden, is an archaeological park established in the 1990s in the Old City of Jerusalem. It is located south of the Western Wall Plaza and under the Dung Gate. The park was managed by the Ir David Foundation until 2021, when it changed management to the Company for the Reconstruction and Development of the Jewish Quarter.

The park contains an exhibition building, the Davidson Center, which displays finds from the surrounding excavations, including stone weights, ossuaries, and fragments of the Herodian Temple Mount's decorative stonework. The center reopened in 2023 after renovations, adding interactive galleries and new technology, and exhibits a rare coin minted by the last Hasmonean king, Antigonus II Mattathias, bearing the earliest known artistic depiction of the Temple menorah, predating the Temple's destruction by 107 years.

== Location ==
The Park is located in the northern Ophel of Jerusalem at the foot of the Temple Mount's Southern Wall. It contains archaeological finds from the Bronze Age in 3,000 BC up to the Ottoman Period in the early 20th century. The area of the property is around 20 dunams, and is partly bounded by the Ophel Road. Its entrance is through an underpass on the access road to the Western Wall.

Ophel is a biblical term for an elevated part of the city where the administrative center was located. Its ascent to the Temple was from the City of David through the Ophel, which is mentioned in the Book of Chronicles.

=== Compound division ===
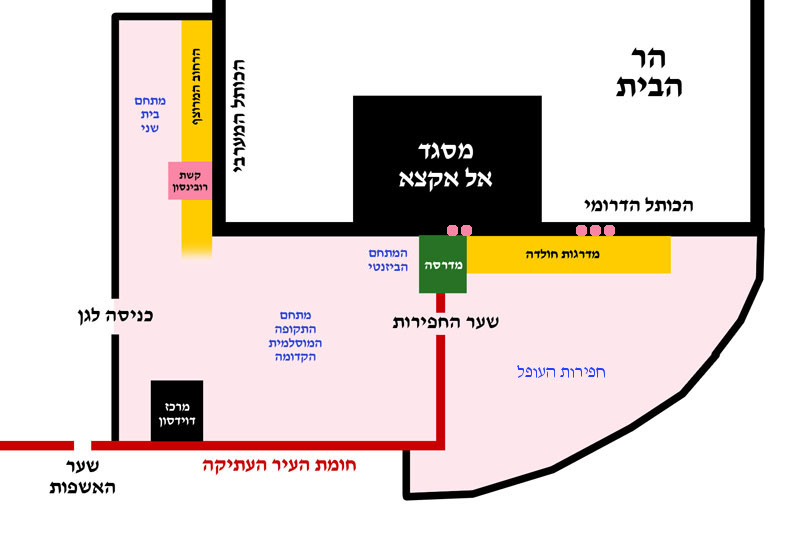
Map of the archaeological park

The excavation team had to decide which layer to preserve on site, as there were multiple layers of history on location continuously for 3,000 years. In the end, it was decided that the park would be divided into 3 sections, each based on a single layer excavation, to varying depths. They are as follows:

- Second Temple Compound - The area adjacent to the Western Wall was excavated up to the Second Temple period, around 2,000 years ago.
- Byzantine Compound - The area adjacent to the eastern half of the Southern Wall mainly displayed artifacts from the Byzantine period, about 1,500 years ago.
- Early Muslim Period Compound - The area adjacent to the western half of the Southern wall focuses on the Early Muslim Period, around 1,300 years ago.

== History ==
British archaeologist Charles Warren was the first to excavate the area in the 1860s. Ottoman authorities forbade him to dig on or near the Temple Mount, claiming that it would damage a site holy to Islam. To circumvent the rules, he travelled through tunnels and underground shafts. Using the more difficult method, he discovered many important findings. In the 1960s, when the Old City was under Jordanian control, Kathleen Kenyon was granted ability to excavate there, mostly near the City of David.

Following the Six-Day War in 1967, Israeli archaeologists began excavating in and around the Old City. Due to religious tension, it was decided that they would not excavate by the Temple Mount, and they instead searched around the Temple Mount. Benjamin Mazar of the Archaeological Institute at the Hebrew University of Jerusalem was appointed chief archaeologist for the project. The land, owned by the Jerusalem Waqf, was leased for him to do his archaeological dig. The excavation lasted for a decade, and became one of the largest archaeological projects in Israeli history. Archaeologists' publications called their research the "Excavations of the Temple Mount", even though the Mount itself was not excavated. The dig and many of its discoveries brought forth great interest in both the academic community, as well as among the general public.

The excavation ended in 1978, although another of smaller reports were published afterwards, along with many scholarly analyses of the published findings. In 1989, Mazar and his granddaughter Eilat published a report. Benjamin died in 1995 before his final report was issued, and a team headed by his daughter published the rest of the report from the site. At the end of the 1990s, the site was declared a park by the Israeli government, and the Davidson Center Museum was opened, displaying artifacts discovered within its limits.

== Second Temple Compound ==
Previous excavations in the park showed that the area near the junction of the Southern Wall to the Western Wall is rich in finds from the Second Temple period. Due to this, it was decided to deepen excavations of the site for this eldest layer, dismantling the staging of the finds from later layers. The decision also cancelled the deepening of the excavation up to the First Temple period, or earlier periods.

=== Herodian Street ===
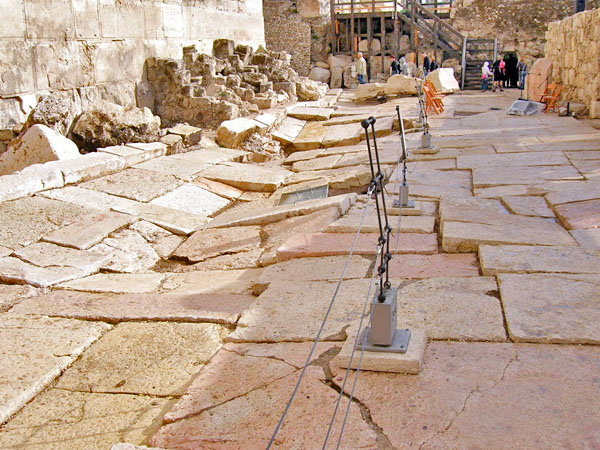
Segment of the surviving street, damaged by the destruction of the Temple

One of the most striking finds located in the Second Temple compound of the park is a paved street adjacent to the Western Wall. The street was part of the complex, from which pilgrims could access the western entryway of the Temple. Along the street, adjacent to the wall, a series of shops were uncovered, perhaps for ritual items related to worship. The continuation of the street was discovered in 2007 on the slopes of the City of David near the Pool of Siloam, where the road ends.

Parts of the street had already been discovered by Warren in the 19th century prior to the formal establishment of the park, and Mazar had further excavated other parts of it, but the rest of the street (about 75 meters) had been discovered by Ronny Reich. The street is around 750 meters long and eight meters wide, and is bounded on both sides by high stone curbs. It was almost entirely covered by a pile of stones from the wall, which had been thrown from high above by the Romans during the Siege of Jerusalem in 70 AD. The majority of those stones were cleared and moved into another part of the garden.

Reich and colleague Yaakov Billig additionally excavated 15 ancient coins from under the road, the latest coin having been minted under the reign of Pontius Pilate, indicating that the road had been built after he began his rule. The paving stones, which were unworn, imply that the road was not used long after its construction was completion. The road had initially been attributed to King Herod, but more contemporary scholars date it to Agrippa II. Josephus states in the early days of Roman commissioner Albinus (AD 62–64), the streets began to be paved with white stone due to make up for the fact that the completion of the construction of the Temple Mount had caused a severe lack of employment in the region.

=== Trumpeting Place inscription ===
Discovered by Mazar in 1968, one of the stones from the landslide, where it fell to its location of discovery, was found near the southwestern corner of the Temple Mount. It was the cornerhead of one of the walls that had been thrown by the Romans during the Temple Mount's dismantling. The "Trumpeting Place" stone bears an inscription that states "To the house of takiah to..." before the text becomes illegible. The house of takiah potentially refers to a place where the Israelites blew the shofar to announce the begin of holidays and the Sabbath, as explained by Josephus.

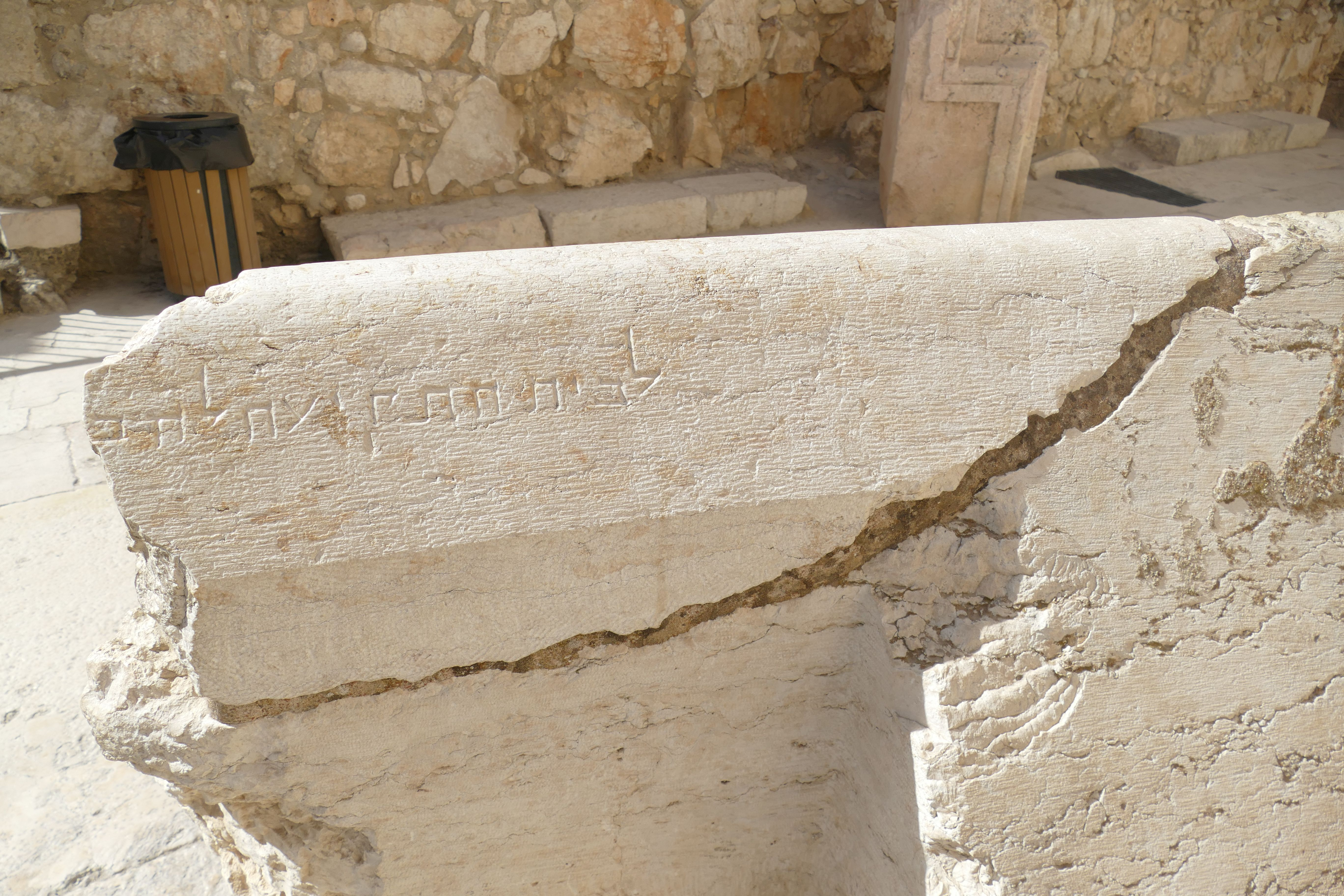
Replica of the Trumpeting Place inscription

The location of impact indicated that the location of the stones discovered by Mazar had been at the top of the corner connecting the Western and Southern Walls at a high point overlooking the city to ensure the sound was able to be heard by all residents of the area.

== Byzantine Compound ==
The second compound of the park displays the remains from the period of occupation by the Byzantine Empire, whose inhabitants lived on top of the remnants of the ruins of the Jewish period. The neighborhood was dense with construction by the end of the 4th century in the Eastern part of the Ophel and included many churches, shops, and homes. There are many mosaics among the surviving floors, some of which have geometric designs. It is theorized that the neighborhood was destroyed during the Persian invasion of 614, and it was not rebuilt afterwards.

== Muslim Compound ==
=== Umayyad Palaces ===
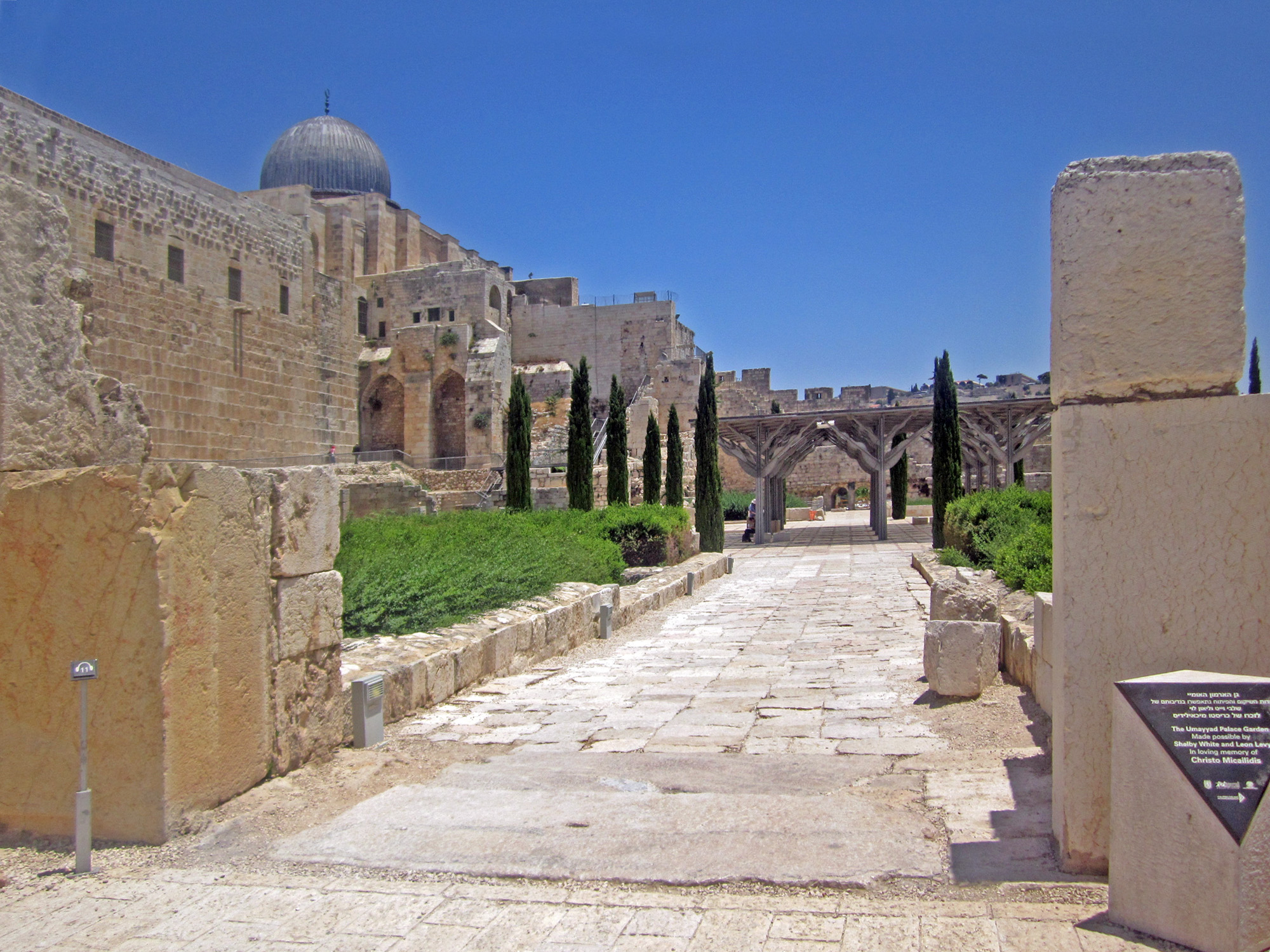
Entrance to the Umayyad Palace, 2006

The third and most recent layer, the early Muslim compound, is dated to the seventh century. Mazar uncovered four palaces from the reign of al-Walid I during the Umayyad Caliphate. These cover the entire area of the garden and formed a ruling complex for royalty. The garden displays the remains of only one of them, "#2," whose roof once was connected by a bridge to the al-Aqsa Mosque. Some of the walls were built using stones that had once belonged to the Temple Mount prior to the Roman destruction. The palace was sometimes as three stories high, and archaeologists theorize that the palaces were destroyed during an earthquake in the mid-eighth century. It was not rebuilt following its destruction. It was subsequently abandoned, and the remains were used several centuries later in fortifications by the Fatimid Caliphate.

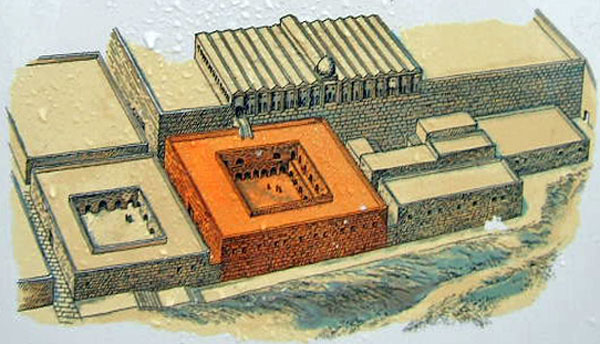
A painting reconstructing Umayyad palaces in the Archaeological Park

In the 16th century, the Ottoman Empire used the outer wall of the palace and mounted a city wall onto it. Because of that, the Ottoman wall only reaches the corner of the palace, and then turns at a 90-degree angle northwards and connections in an arbitrary manner to the Temple Mount in the middle of the Southern Wall. In order to continue the garden, the excavators broke a hole through the wall to have a contiguous garden.

=== Synagogue ===
West of the palace are the remains of a synagogue from the period of Muslim rule. The building was presumably two stories and included a courtyard in the building boundaries. The identification of the building as a synagogue is largely based on two red paintings of a menorah on the walls, as well as another painting of a menorah on stone, which was discovered in a room that had collapsed. Holes were discovered in all entrances to the rooms, which are hypothesized to have been small alcoves for mezuzot. Christians during the Byzantine period may have occupied the building, and Jews were allowed to return to the building when the Arab period began. The synagogue served for 60 years until the Umayyad Palace was built on it.

== Davidson Center ==
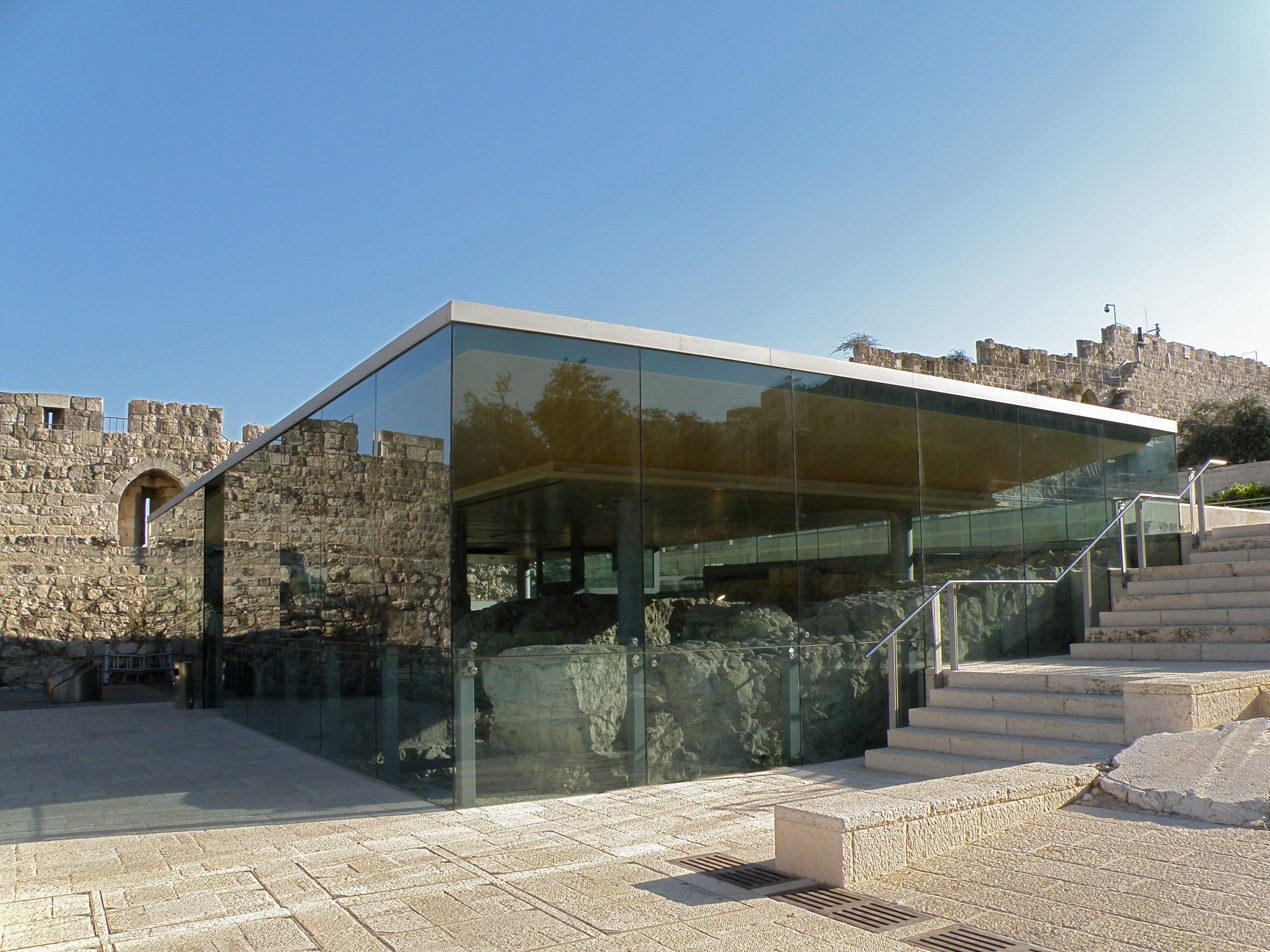
Davidson Center

The Ethan and Miriam Davidson Exhibition and Virtual Reconstruction Center was opened in April 2001. The center exhibits a selection of artifacts found during excavations in the area and presents a virtual reconstruction of how the Temple Mount may have appeared before its destruction in 70 AD. The center is housed in part of the Umayyad palace and was established by the East Jerusalem Development Company (EJDC) and Israel Antiquities Authority. The center was built without permits, leading to a court case between the EJDC and the Company for the Reconstruction and Development of the Jewish Quarter (JQDC). The court decided that ownership would be conferred on the JQDC, and the two organisations also agreed to allow the Elad Foundation to run the center in exchange for paying the EJDC's outstanding rent to JQDC.
