= Western Wall Plaza =

Public square in the Old City of Jerusalem

Coordinates: 31.776481°N 35.233667°E

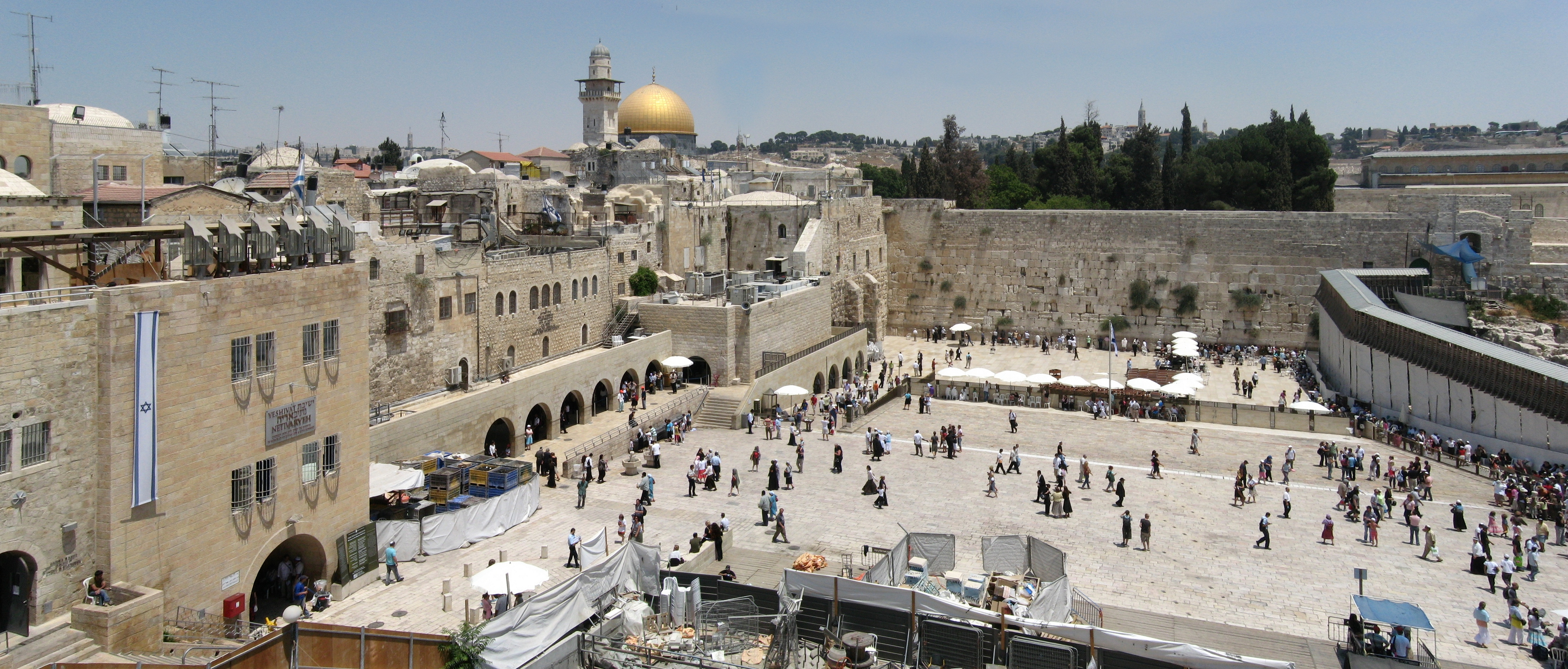
Western Wall Plaza with the Western Wall in the background

The Western Wall Plaza is a large public square situated adjacent to the Western Wall in the Jewish Quarter of the Old City of Jerusalem, Israel. It was formed in 1967 as a result of the razing of the Mughrabi Quarter neighborhood at the very end of the Six-Day War.

== Location ==
The Western Wall Plaza abuts the Western Wall, part of the ancient retaining wall erected by Herod the Great to surround and increase the surface area of the Temple Mount. Apart from the Western Wall to the east, the plaza is bordered on its north side by the two Western Wall Foundation facilities (the Chain of Generations Center and the entrance to the Western Wall Tunnels), Yeshivat Netiv Aryeh, and a passage to the Muslim Quarter to the Valley Street (HaGay or al-Wad); by Aish HaTorah, Porat Yosef Yeshiva and the Jewish Quarter via the Yehuda HaLevi Stairs on its west side; and by the Jerusalem Archaeological Park and the exits towards Dung Gate on its south.

The plaza measures 10,000 square meters and can accommodate up to 400,000 persons per day.

== History ==
=== Mughrabi Quarter (12th-20th century) ===
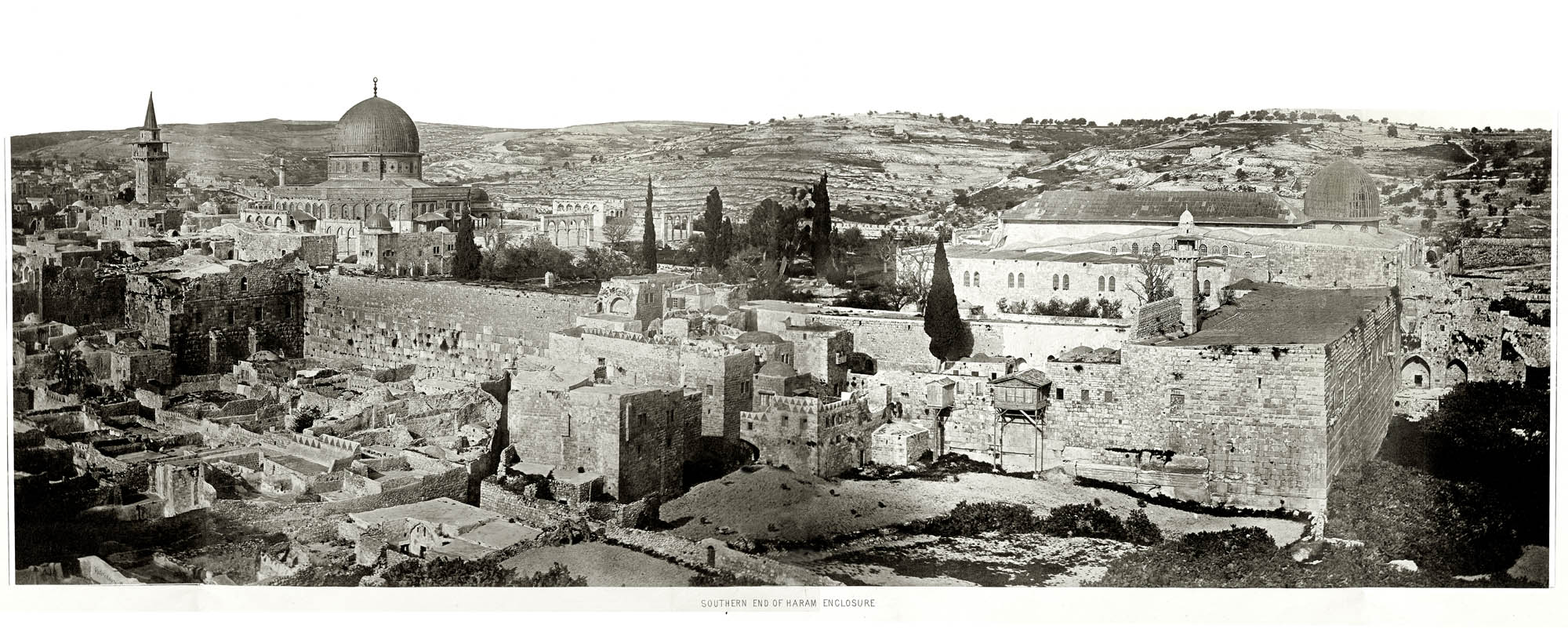
19th century view of the area which became the Plaza

The site was the location of the Mughrabi Quarter, a neighbourhood founded by El Afdal, son of Saladin, in 1193.

In the second half of the nineteenth century, the viability of the Mughrabi Quarter in Jerusalem began to decline, due in part to the ambitions of the emerging secular Zionist movement. A small number of wealthy Zionists sought to acquire the Western Wall but were unsuccessful. Among them was Edmond James de Rothschild, who in 1887 attempted to purchase the entire quarter with the intention of demolishing it and creating a plaza. Rabbi Chaim Hirschensohn and the Zionist Palestine Land Development Company also tried to acquire the Western Wall in 1895, without success.

In 1914, amid the Ottoman Empire’s bankruptcy and its involvement in the First World War, Zeki Bey, the Ottoman governor of Jerusalem, offered unsuccessfully to sell the Mughrabi Quarter for £20,000. Five years later, in 1919, following the League of Nations’ granting of the British Mandate for Palestine, Zionist leader Chaim Weizmann sought to raise £75,000 to purchase the quarter, demolish it, and relocate its residents; however, the British authorities upheld the existing status quo.

Zionist attempts to challenge the status quo continued into the 1920s, contributing to ongoing tensions. In 1926, American Jewish philanthropist Nathan Straus proposed leasing and eventually purchasing the Mughrabi Quarter, but this too was rejected by the British authorities, who maintained the status quo ante.

In August 1929, tensions escalated into violent riots between Jews and Muslims over access to the Western Wall, sparked by an incident in which a group of Jews raised the Zionist flag and sang the Zionist anthem. Despite official prohibitions by the Mandatory authorities, Zionist demonstrations at the site persisted through the 1930s and 1940s.

=== Demolition (1967) ===
On June 10, three days after the capture of the Old City by the Israel Defence Forces and still during the Six-Day War of 1967, one hour before midnight, civil contractors began work by demolishing a toilet built up against the Western Wall, which had provoked the ire of Prime Minister David Ben-Gurion during his visit a day earlier. A request had gone out to the inhabitants of the Moroccan Quarter to evacuate all 135 houses, which along with the Sheikh Eid Mosque were bulldozed to make way for the plaza. This was done ahead of the upcoming holiday of Shavuot, during which it was anticipated that many thousand Israelis would seek to visit the site. It was also seen as an opportunity that would not return, given the chaotic situation during the closing days of the war and its immediate aftermath. The only surviving relic from the neighborhood was the so-called Mughrabi Bridge, a ramp which overlooked the plaza and terminated at the Mughrabi Gate, allowing for access to the Temple Mount above.

=== First Intifada incident (1990) ===
On 8 October 1990, during the First Intifada, Jewish worshipers in the plaza were pelted with stones hurled by Palestinians attending prayers in the al-Aqsa Mosque, the plaza known to Jews as the Temple Mount.

== Archaeology ==
=== Northwest area ===
Archaeological excavations took place at the northwestern edge of the Western Wall Plaza, c. 100 meters west of the Temple Mount.

==== Late First Temple period ====
The archaeologists made numerous Late First Temple period findings characteristic of the Kingdom of Judah in the time between the end of the 8th century BCE and the destruction of Jerusalem in 586 BCE. These included building remains, some preserved to a height of more than 2 meters. A large quantity of pottery was discovered, including numerous fertility and animal figurines and jar handles with the stamped inscription "LMLK". Another inscription in ancient Hebrew script reads "[belonging] to the king of Hebron".

A First Temple period seal made of semi-precious stone containing ancient Hebrew writing which includes the name "Netanyahu ben Yaush" was found as well. Netanyahu is a name mentioned several times in the Book of Jeremiah while the name Yaush appears in the Lachish letters. However, the combination of names was unknown to scholars.

==== Late Roman period ====
During the same excavations, part of the Roman 2nd-century CE Eastern Cardo was uncovered, as well as a street segment dated around 130 CE and leading westwards towards the Temple Mount.

=== North side (Beit Strauss) ===
In October 2020, archaeologists led by Dr. Barak Monnickendam-Givon from the Israel Antiquities Authority (IAA) announced the discovery of a 2,700-year-old two-shekel limestone weight. That places it in the First Temple period, during the Iron Age. According to the IAA, there were two parallel Egyptian symbols resembling a Greek gamma on the surface of the smooth round stone weighing precisely 23 grams (one shekel weighed 11.5 gr) and confirming the development of trade and commerce in ancient Jerusalem.

== Usage ==
The plaza is divided by a low wall of Jerusalem stone into two sections. A smaller section immediately adjacent to the Western Wall, and further divided into two sections by a mechitza for opposite genders, serves as an open-air synagogue. It has since become a popular place to hold bar mitzva ceremonies.

The larger section immediately west and south of the smaller one acts as a crowd overflow area for the first, but by itself serving as the location for induction ceremonies of IDF soldiers.

While the plaza is open to all, the Ministry of Religious Services employs modesty guards to ensure visitors dress appropriately to the holiness of the site and as a courtesy to worshipers.

== Other plans ==
In August 1967, the architect Yosef Shenberger was called upon to present a design for the plaza, but his idea quickly became the first of many to be torpedoed by planning boards.

In 1970, landscape architect Shlomo Aronson proposed digging the eastern plaza down to the street level of the Second Temple period.

In 1972, Moshe Safdie was hired to submit a proposal for the plaza. He followed Aronson's plan somewhat, with a series of terraced plazas descending to the Herodian era street level adjacent to the Western Wall, but his proposal was scrapped as well.

In 1976, Irwin Shimron headed the Shimron Committee, which was set up to explore all the options for the development of the plaza. The committee recommended implementing Safdie's proposal, with nothing coming of it to date.

== See also ==
- Beit Haliba Excavations
- List of city squares by size
