= Bircas HaTorah =

Coordinates: 31°46′30.79″N 35°13′49.6″E

Yeshivas Bircas HaTorah is an Haredi yeshiva located in the Jewish Quarter of the Old City of Jerusalem, founded by Rabbi Shimon Green in 1989. The Yeshiva utilizes a logical and rhetorical method that makes precision-Talmudic learning accessible to anyone who follows it diligently.

== History ==
The yeshiva was founded in 1989 by Rabbi Shimon Green with two goals: To make high-level talmudic learning more widely accessible, and to allow students of all ages and backgrounds to study in an intensive yeshiva atmosphere. Yeshivas Bircas HaTorah started in the building of the original Etz Chaim Yeshiva, located in front of the Old City's Hurva Synagogue, with only a few students. As the number of students grew steadily, the Yeshiva moved, in 2000, to its current location on Ohr HaChaim Street just above the Cardo in the Jewish Quarter.

In June 2010, his student, Rabbi Nissim Tagger became Rosh HaYeshiva and Rabbi Asher Baruch Wegbreit was named Mashgiach Ruchani. Since then, the yeshiva has steadily grown the size of its Post-High School Yeshiva Program and is expanding to incorporate the site of the original Jerusalem Heritage House, soon to become known as the Gershon Burd Building. The Gershon Burd Building expansion is scheduled to open in early 2020.

The yeshiva's students hail from New York, Johannesburg, Jerusalem, Toronto, England, Los Angeles, Memphis, Antwerp, Denver and others. Some students earn college degrees through the Rechtschaffen Institute of Judaic Studies, affiliated with Touro College, Excelsior College, Thomas Edison University, Charter Oak University and Empire State College. The yeshiva offers a semicha program administered by Rabbi Dov Sendler. Many of its alumni have returned to their home cities and continue their Torah education in local yeshivas and kollels. Other graduates go on to study at major universities.
