= Israelite Tower =

- המגדל הישראלי
- Location within Jerusalem
- 31°46′35.09″N 35°13′54.62″E
- Type: fortification
- Periods: Iron Age, Hasmonean

History
- Built: 8/7th century BCE
- Abandoned: 586 BCE

Site notes
- Material: stone
- Excavation dates: 1969-1982
- Archaeologists: Nahman Avigad
- Public access: limited

Map of Jerusalem's Jewish Quarter. The Israelite Tower stands north of the Broad Wall (number 4)

The Israelite Tower (Hebrew: המגדל הישראלי) is an archaeological site in Jerusalem's Jewish Quarter. The site features remains of the city's Iron Age fortifications which were later incorporated into the Hasmonean city walls. It was excavated by Israeli archaeologist Nahman Avigad during the 1970s. Finds unearthed at the site attest to the Babylonian destruction of Jerusalem in 586 BCE.

== Excavation ==
Between 1969 and 1982, Nahman Avigad conducted extensive excavations in the Jewish Quarter, situated on Jerusalem's southwestern hill. These excavations, covering an area of some 5 acres, proved crucial for the understanding of the history of settlement in this section of the old city. In the northern part of the quarter, Avigad and his team uncovered three well-preserved segments of late Iron Age (First Temple period) fortifications. One of these was the Israelite Tower, described as "one of the most impressive fortification remains from biblical times to have been found in the Land of Israel".

=== Israelite Tower ===
Slightly north of the Broad Wall, excavations revealed two perpendicular walls about 4 metres (13 ft) wide and surviving to a maximal height of 7 metres (23 ft). One is 12 metres (39 ft) long, running from east to west, and the other 8 metres (26 ft) long and runs from north to south. Standing on bedrock 45 feet below modern ground level, the walls were built of rough-hewn field stones placed in courses along both faces, with the spaces in-between filled with small stones. A surface of beaten earth tightly bonded to the tower, covered by ashes, produced Late Iron Age II sherds characteristic of the 8th and 7th centuries BCE. Avigad identified the tower as the corner of a four-chambered gatehouse in Jerusalem's northern wall, perhaps the "Middle Gate" mentioned in Jeremiah 39:3. It had been built to protect the city's vulnerable northern perimeter, probably during the 8th century BCE but perhaps during the reign of Menasseh in the 7th century BCE. It is physically close to the Broad Wall, built during the reign of king Hezekiah, but appears to have come into use after the Broad Wall had already fallen into disuse.

Finds at the tower attest to a battle. On the last day of the 1975 excavation season, Avigad's team unearthed four arrowheads buried in the layer of soot and ashes at the base of the tower. One was made of iron and the other three of bronze, including one distinguished from the others by three triangular fins and a hollow socket for the shaft. This was identified as a Scytho-Iranian type in widespread use by Babylonian archers after 600 BCE. As the pottery found within the conflagration layer is dated earlier than 586 BCE, the range of dates for the possible battle at the site is reduced significantly. The four arrowheads are therefore likely remnants of the Babylonian siege and destruction of Jerusalem in 586 BCE. They are thought to be the first remains ever recovered of the Babylonian siege, having come to rest in the ashes of the burning city, as described in 2 Kings 25.

Avigad's discoveries also provided an answer to a contemporary debate about the extent of Iron Age Jerusalem. Before the excavation of the Jewish quarter, scholars had been divided between those that believed the city had been confined to its eastern ridge, including the Temple Mount and the City of David, and those who believed the biblical city has already expanded to encompass the southwestern hill. Avigad's discoveries, since augmented by additional finds, had proven that by the end of the First Temple period, Jerusalem's city walls had expanded to the Hinnom Valley in the west and had encompassed the entire southwestern hill.

=== Hasmonean Tower ===
Abutting and incorporating the Israelite Tower are the remains of another tower and city wall. Shaped like the Greek letter π, the tower extends north from the wall. Constructed of medium-size, well-cut, close-fitting rectangular ashlars, the tower walls are 9 metres (30 ft) long and between 2.5m and 3m thick. The masonry is characteristic of the 1st or 2nd centuries BCE, as is the pottery found on and below another surface bonded to the wall, 1.3 meters above the earlier 6th century floor. These have linked the later defences to the Hasmonean "First Wall", described in detail in Josephus' The Jewish War. Although Josephus erroneously attributes it to David, Solomon and the kings of Judah, construction of the wall was initiated by Jonathan Maccabeus and completed by his brother Simon during the 2nd century BCE. A nearby gap between fragments of the wall hints that another city gate stood at the site, possibly the Gennath gate also mentioned by Josephus.

== Access ==
The Israelite Tower is located at the modern junction of Plugot HaKotel and Shonei HaLakhot streets, preserved underneath a school. Access is limited and requires reservation.

== See also ==
- Architecture of ancient Israel
- Jerusalem during the Second Temple period
