= Broad Wall (Jerusalem) =

Ancient wall in Jerusalem built by Hezekiah

- החומה הרחבה (Hebrew)
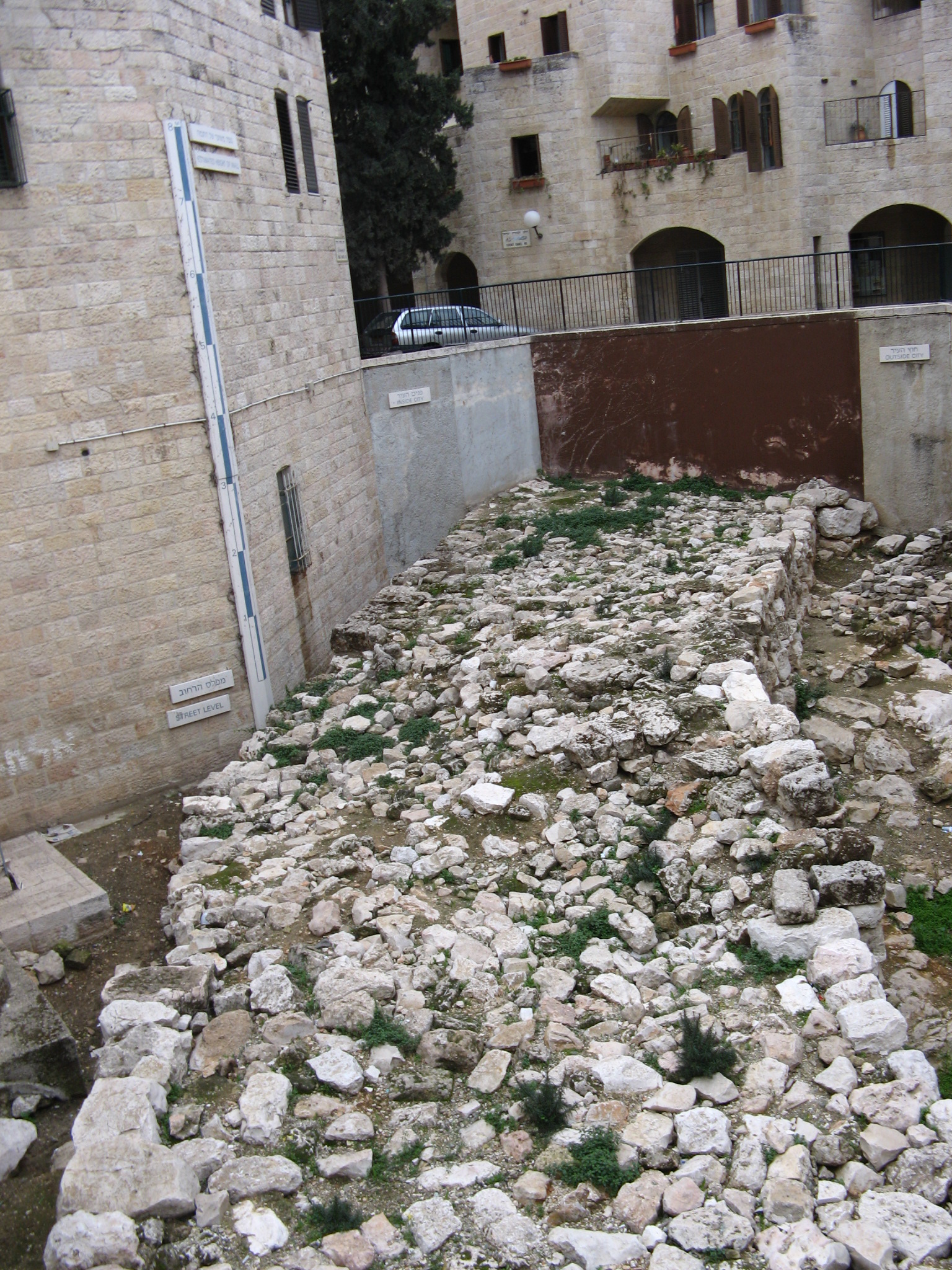
- Marker (on the wall to the left) showing presumed height of the wall

- Map of Jerusalem's Jewish Quarter, showing the Broad Wall
- Interactive map of Broad Wall
- 31°46′33.9″N 35°13′54.8″E
- Type: Defensive wall
- Periods: Iron Age (First Temple period)
- Cultures: Judahite
- Location: Jewish Quarter, Jerusalem

History
- Built: 8th century BC
- Built by: King Uzziah
- Abandoned: 586 BCE
- Event: Second Siege of Jerusalem

Site notes
- Material: Limestone
- Height: 3.3 metres (11 ft)
- Length: 65 metres (213 ft)
- Width: 7 metres (23 ft)
- Excavation dates: 1970s
- Archaeologists: Nahman Avigad
- Condition: Exposed archaeological site
- Year of event: 587 BC

UNESCO World Heritage Site
- Type: Cultural
- Criteria: ii, iii, vi
- Designated: 1981
- Part of: Old City of Jerusalem and its Walls
- Reference no.: 148

The Broad Wall (Hebrew: החומה הרחבה, romanized: HaChoma HaRechava) is an ancient defensive wall, located in the Jewish Quarter of Jerusalem's Old City. The wall was unearthed in the 1970s by Israeli archaeologist Nahman Avigad. Originally dated to the reign of King Hezekiah (reigned 716/15–687/86 BC), it has been attributed in 2024, based on carbon-dating, to the reign of King Uzziah (reigned 791–750 BC).

== Size ==
The Broad Wall is a massive defensive structure, 7 metres (7.7 yd) thick. The unbroken length of wall uncovered by Avigad's dig runs 65 metres (71.1 yd) long and is preserved in places to a height of 3.3 metres (3.6 yd).

== Indications of being part of Uzziah's rebuild of Jerusalem after an earthquake ==
It was long believed that the city in this period was confined to the fortified, narrow hill running to the south of the Temple Mount known as the City of David. Avigad's dig demonstrated that by the late eighth century BC the city had expanded to include the hill to the west of the Temple Mount. As long as the wall was attributed to Hezekiah, the motivation for building it was believed to have been Sennacherib's campaign in Judah, and the presumption was that it might be referred to in Book of Nehemiah (Nehemiah 3:8) and the Book of Isaiah (Isaiah 22:9–10). Uzziah's motivation, however, was to rebuild the city after the damage brought about by a strong earthquake.

== See also ==
- Archaeology of Israel
- Architecture of ancient Israel
- Israelite Tower
- Walls of Jerusalem
