= Jewish Quarter (Jerusalem) =

One of the four traditional quarters of Jerusalem's Old City

Coordinates: 31°46′34″N 35°13′56″E

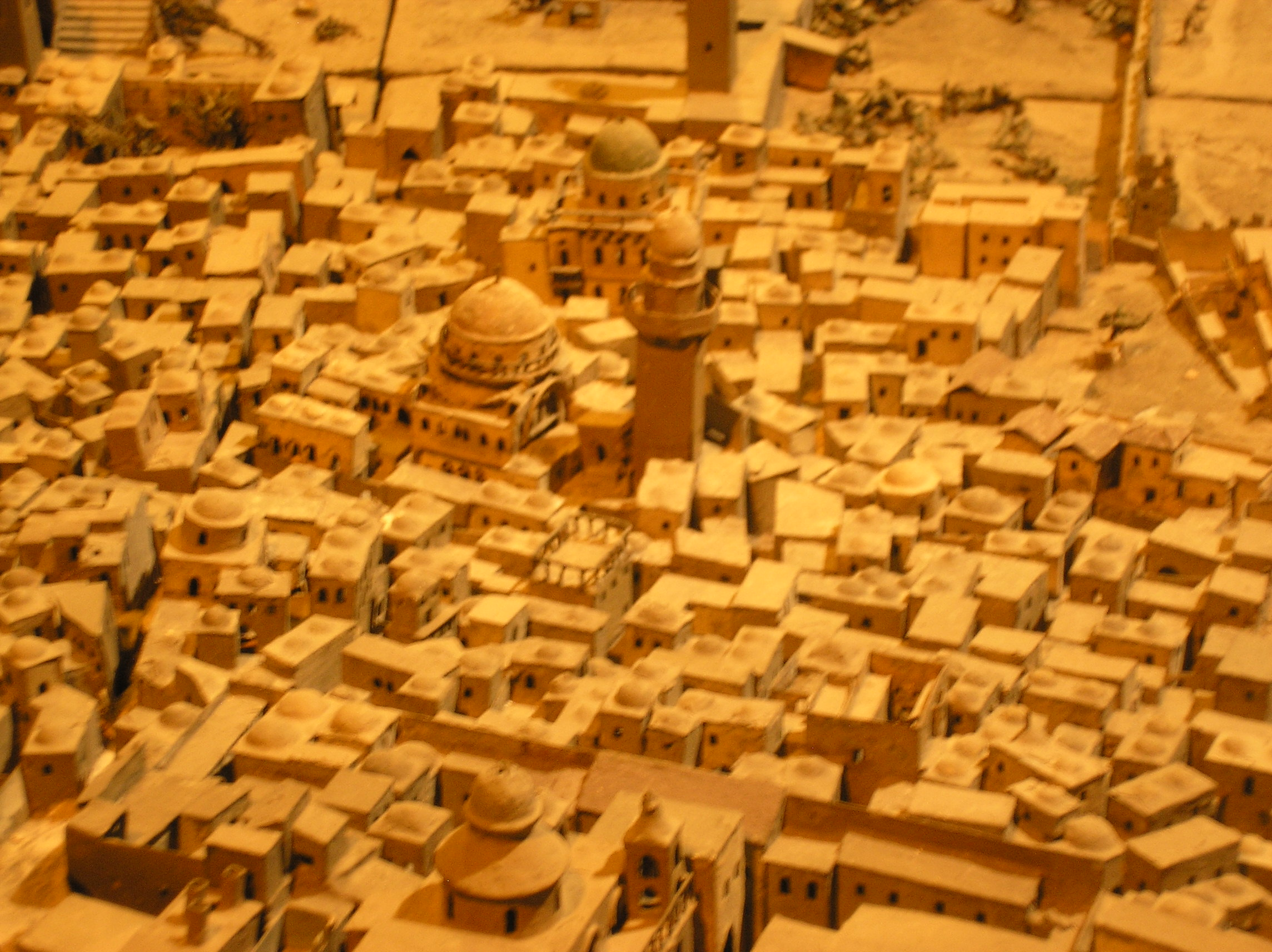
Illes Relief (1864–1873)

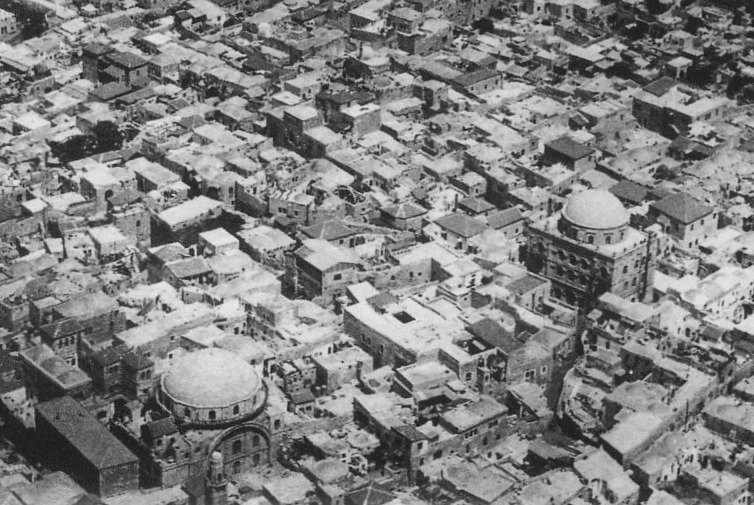
1937 aerial view by Zoltan Kluger

Jewish quarter in the late 19th and early 20th centuries: The two large domes are the Hurva Synagogue (built 1864) and the Tiferet Yisrael Synagogue (built 1872), and the minaret belongs to the Sidna Omar Mosque.

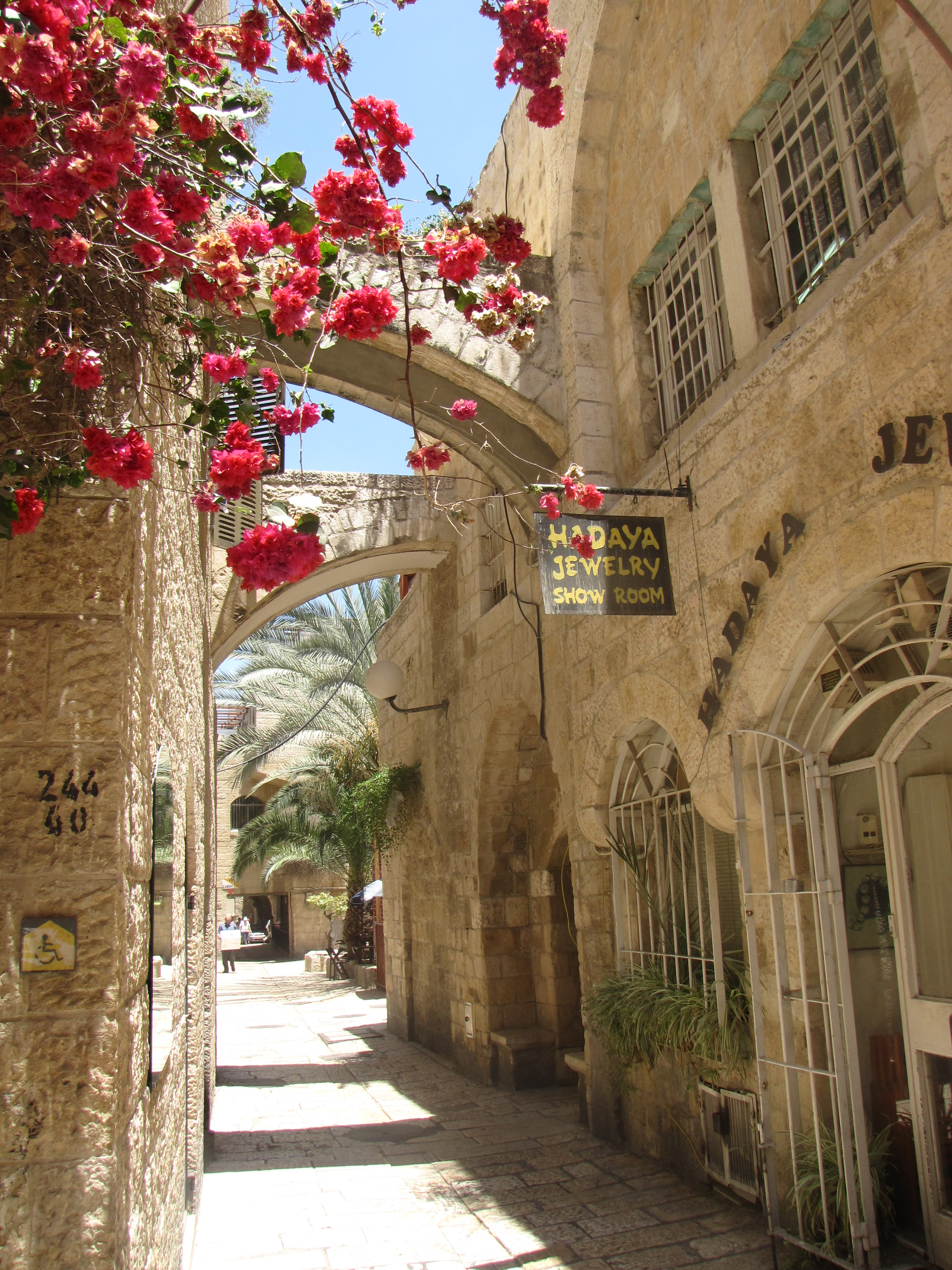
Alley in Jewish Quarter

The Jewish Quarter (Hebrew: הרובע היהודי, romanized: HaRova HaYehudi; Arabic: حارة اليهود, romanized: Ḥāraṫ al-Yehūd) is one of the four traditional quarters of the Old City of Jerusalem. The area lies in the southwestern sector of the walled city, and stretches from the Zion Gate in the south, along the Armenian Quarter on the west, up to the Street of the Chain in the north and extends to the Western Wall and the Temple Mount in the east. In the early 20th century the Jewish population of the quarter reached 19,000.

During the 1948 war, the Jewish Quarter fought the Arab Legion as part of the battle for Jerusalem, and the Hurva synagogue was blown up by Arab legionnaires. In May 1948, the Jewish Quarter surrendered; some Jews were taken captive, and the rest were evacuated. A crowd then systematically pillaged and razed the quarter.

After Israel captured East Jerusalem during the 1967 Six-Day War, the quarter was earmarked for rehabilitation as a tourist destination and a residential neighborhood, and in the years that followed, a large-scale reconstruction and conservation project was undertaken. This project included archeological excavations, which uncovered many remains from the First and Second Temple periods, including the Israelite Tower, the Broad Wall, the Burnt House and the Herodian Quarter, along with remains from later periods, such as the Byzantine Cardo and the Nea Church.

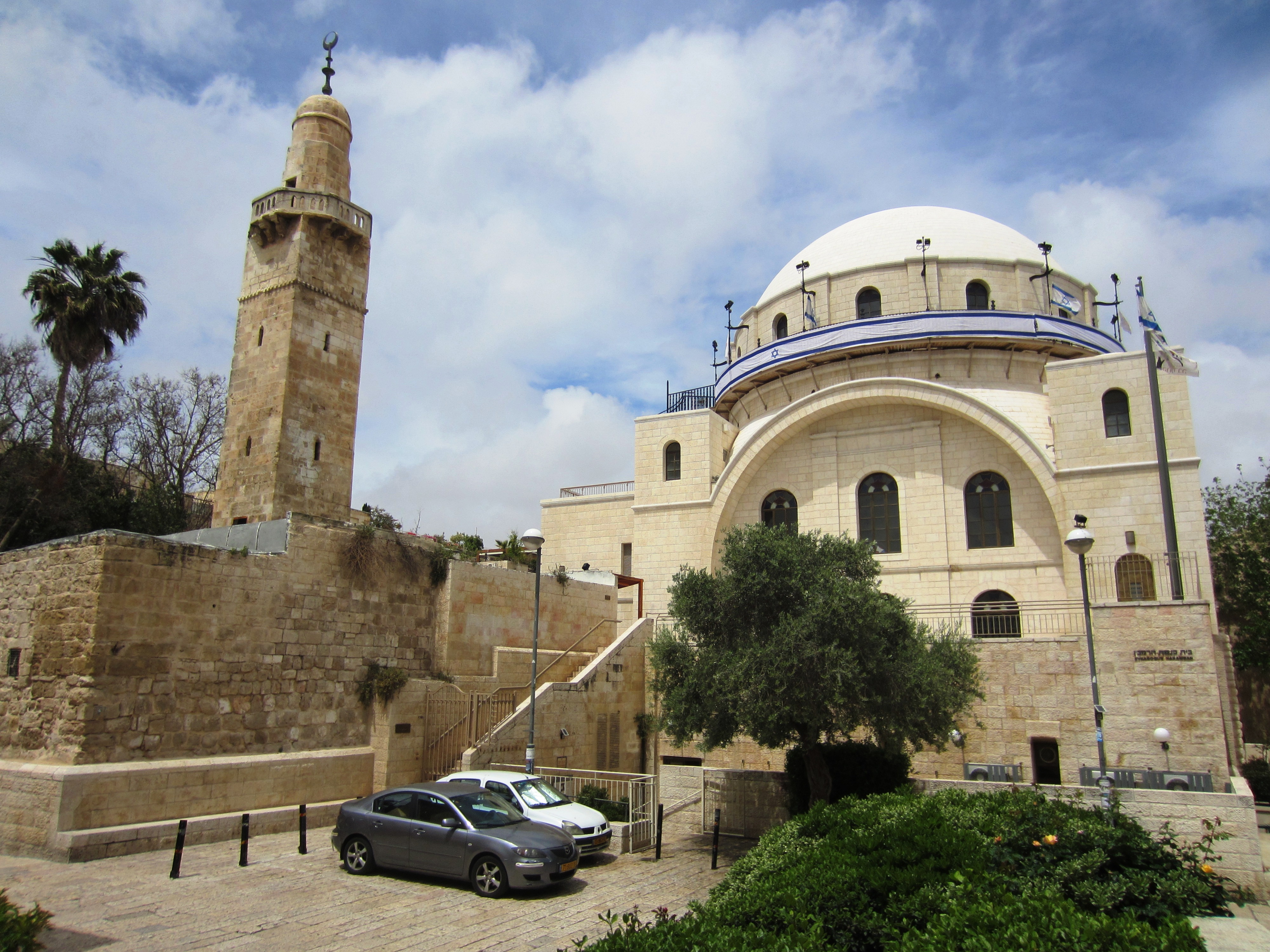
Sidna Omar Mosque and the Hurva Synagogue

As of 2013, the quarter is inhabited by around 3,000 residents and 1,500 students, and is home to numerous yeshivas and synagogues, most notably the Hurva Synagogue, destroyed numerous times and rededicated in 2010. The quarter is also the site of two historical mosques – the Sidna Omar Mosque and the Al Dissi Mosque – both of which have been closed since the Six-Day War.

== Boundaries ==
In late medieval times, the southwest part of what is today known as the Jewish Quarter was known as Haret el-Yahud (where Yahud is Arabic for Jews). The convention of the modern boundaries of the Jewish Quarter may have originated in its current form in the 1841 British Royal Engineers map of Jerusalem, or at least Reverend George Williams' subsequent labelling of it. The city had previously been divided into many more harat (Arabic: حارَة, romanized: Hārat: "quarters", "neighborhoods", "districts" or "areas", see wikt:حارة). From the mid-19th century onwards, the population of Jews in Jerusalem grew considerably, into the eastern part of the Armenian Quarter and the southern part of the Moslem Quarter; as Adar Arnon writes: "neither the traditional term 'Haret el-Yahud' nor its modern counterpart 'Jewish Quarter' could cope with the expansion of the area inhabited by Jews in the south of the Old City in the late nineteenth century".

The table below shows the evolution of the Jewish Quarter and the overlapping Armenian Quarter, from 1495 up until the modern system:

	Local divisions				Western divisions	
Date	1495	1500s	1800s	1900	1840s onwards	
Source	Mujir al-Din	Ottoman Census	Traditional system	Ottoman Census	Modern maps	
Quarters	Bani Harith	Bani Harith	Jawa'na	Sharaf	Armenian Quarter	West
Quarters	Dawiyya	Bani Harith	Jawa'na	Sharaf	Armenian Quarter	North
Quarters	Arman ("Armenian")	Sihyun	Arman	Sharaf	Armenian Quarter	South
Quarters	Yahud ("Jewish")	Sihyun	Yahud			East
Quarters	Yahud ("Jewish")	Risha	Yahud	Silsila	Jewish Quarter	South
Quarters	Yahud ("Jewish")	Maslakh	Yahud	Silsila	Jewish Quarter	South
Quarters	Saltin	Khawaldi	Yahud	Silsila	Jewish Quarter	South
Quarters	Sharaf	Sharaf (Alam)	Yahud	Silsila	Jewish Quarter	South
Quarters	'Alam	Sharaf (Alam)	Yahud	Silsila	Jewish Quarter	North
Quarters	Magharba ("Moroccan / Maghrebi")	Magharba	Magharba	Silsila	Jewish Quarter	East

== History ==
=== Second Temple period ===
Jerusalem stood on two heights during the late Second Temple period, the western hill being the one which was called the "Upper Market," or simply the "Upper City" by Josephus (Hebrew: שוק העליון). The Phasael tower (now called the Tower of David) was also situated in the Upper City, a place used as a stronghold for Simon Bar Giora during the First Jewish–Roman War.

=== Late Roman period ===
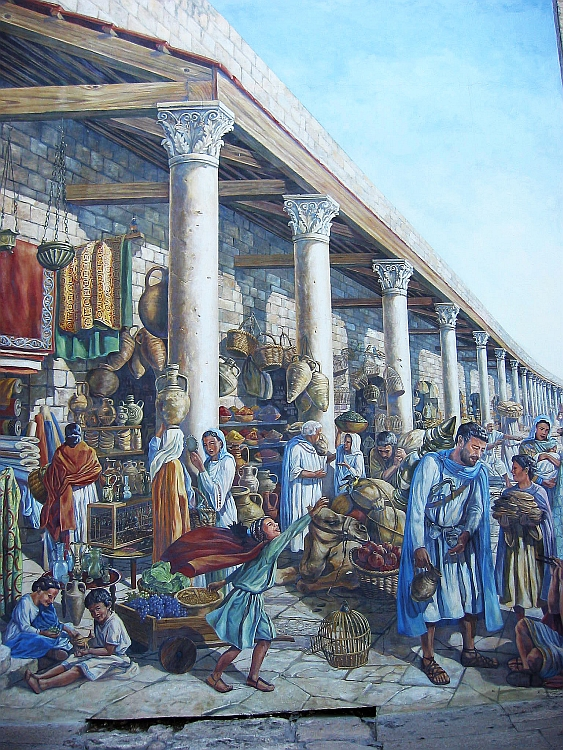
Mural of Roman cardo, Jewish Quarter

In CE 135, when the Roman Emperor Hadrian built the city of Aelia Capitolina on the ruins of ancient Jerusalem, the Tenth Legion set up their camp on the land that is now the Jewish Quarter. New structures, such as a Roman bathhouse, were built over the Jewish ruins.

=== Ottoman period ===
The Jewish quarter was initially located near the Gate of the Moors and Coponius Gate, in the southwestern part of the Western Wall. Most of the housing property consisted of Muslim religious endowments, and was rented out to Jews.

The population of the quarter was not homogeneously Jewish, such a rule being neither desired by the Jewish inhabitants nor enforced by the Ottoman rulers. During the Ottoman era, most of the homes in the quarter were leased from Muslim property owners. This is one of the reasons for the growth of buildings west of the city in the last years of the Ottoman Empire since land outside the city wall was freehold (mulk) and easier to acquire.

While most residents of Jerusalem in the 19th century preferred to live near members of their own community, there were Muslims living in the Jewish Quarter and Jews living in the Muslim Quarter. Many Jews moved to the Muslim Quarter toward the end of the century due to intense overcrowding in the Jewish Quarter.

In 1857, an organization of Dutch and German Jews named Kollel Hod (kolel standing for "society" or "community" and Hod being an abbreviation of Holland and Deutschland) bought a plot of land on which, between 1860 and 1890, the Batei Mahse ("Shelter for the Needy" in Hebrew) housing complex was built. The most prominent building of the project, the two-storey Rothschild House, built in 1871 with money donated by Baron Wilhelm Carl von Rothschild, stands on the west side of the Batei Mahse Square.

Rashid Khalidi claimed that the quarter "originally" covered "four or five acres" (c. 16,200–20,250 m^{2}), of which prior to 1948 the Jewish-owned property amounted to less than 20%.

=== British Mandate period ===
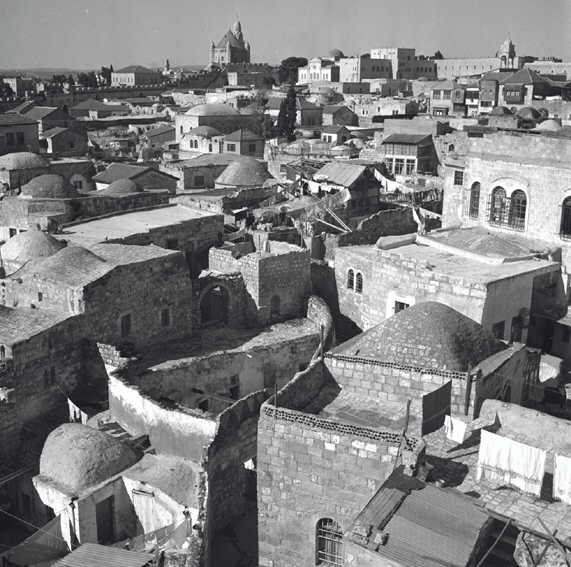
Jewish Quarter 1937

Between December 1917 and May 1948, the entire city of Jerusalem was part of British-administered Palestine, known after 1920 as Mandatory Palestine.

=== 1947–48 hostilities ===
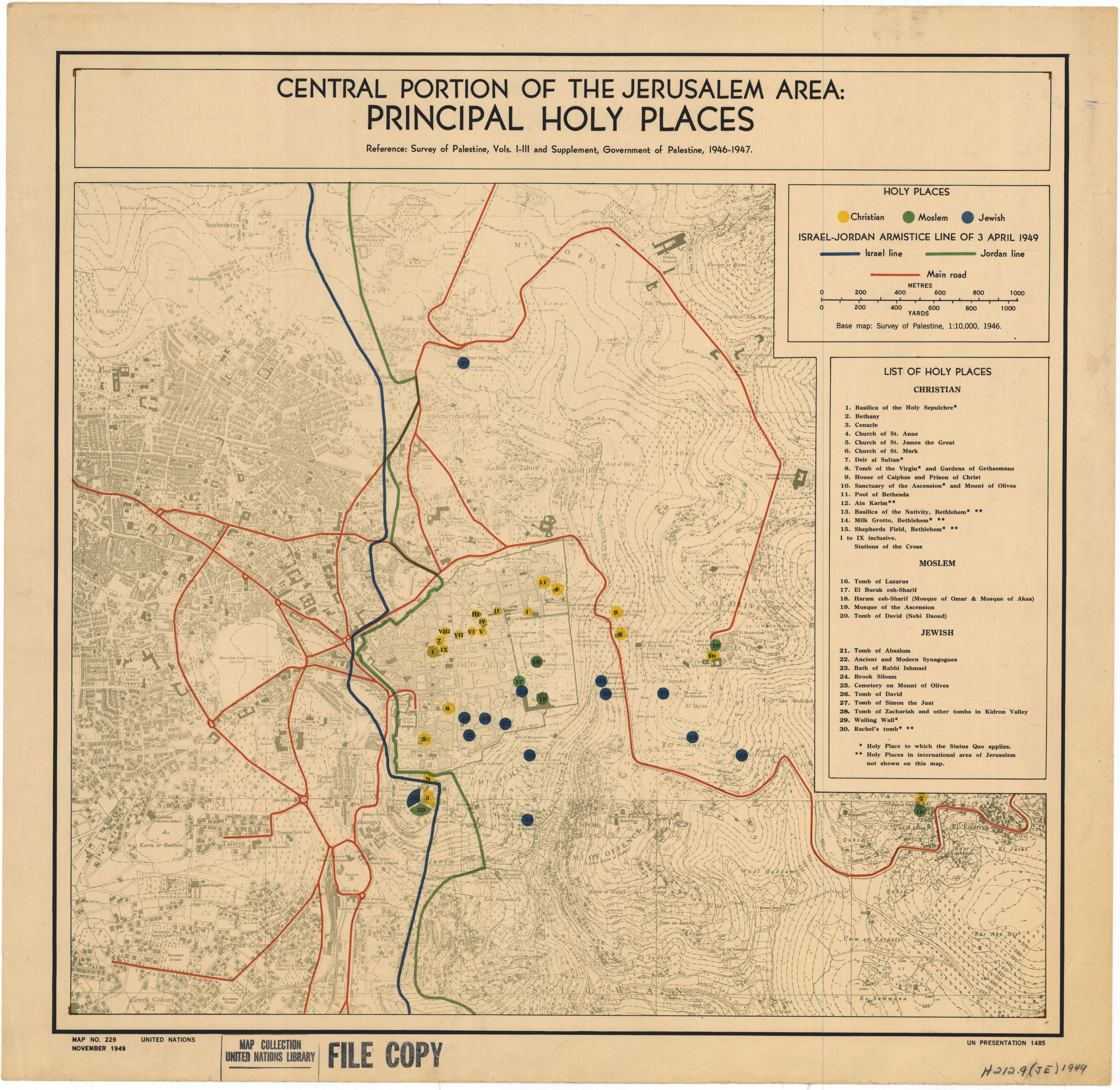
UN Map of Central Jerusalem November 1949

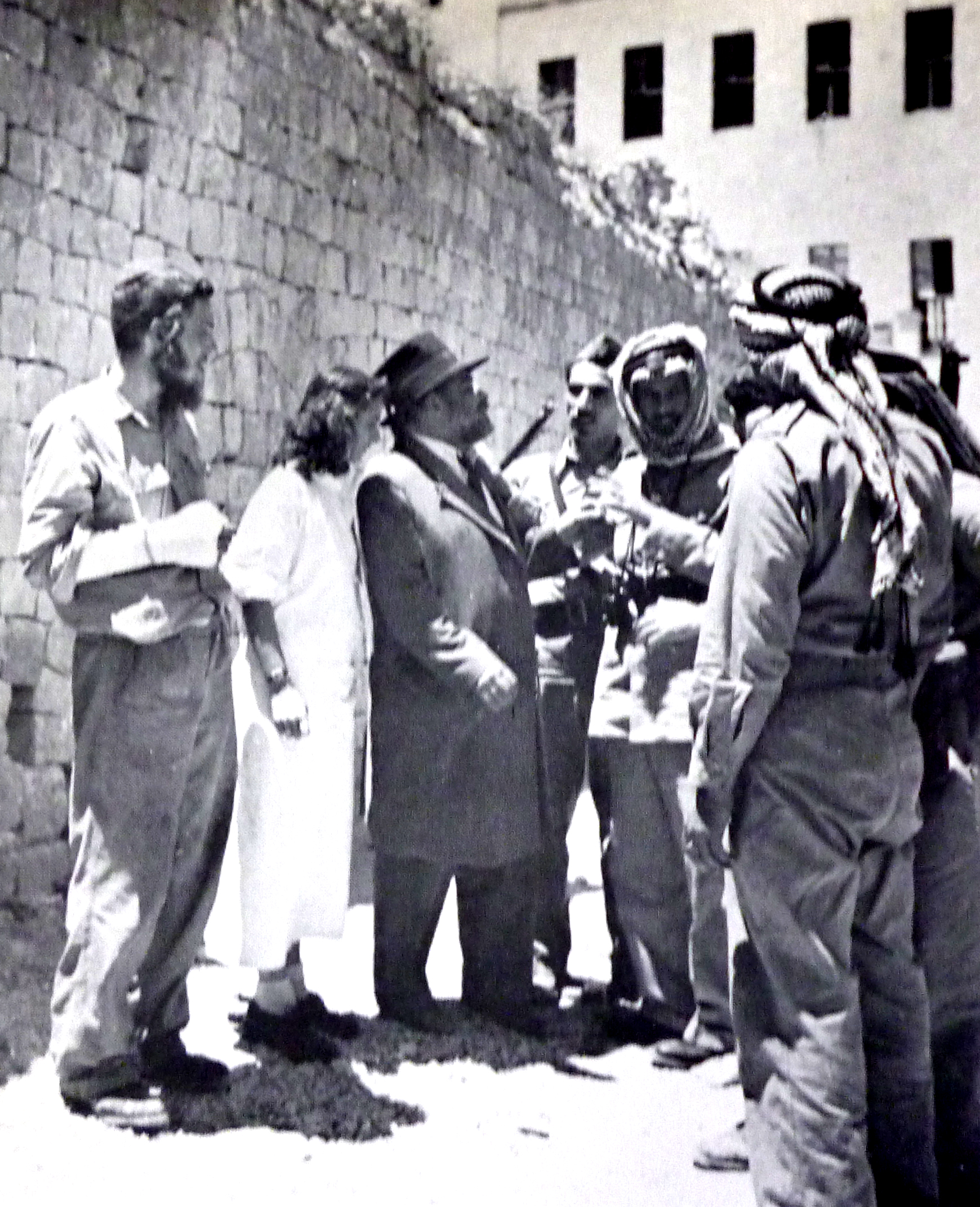
Weingarten negotiating the surrender with Arab Legion soldiers

==== Background ====
Between 1910 and 1948, the number of Jews in Jerusalem rose from 45 to 100 thousand and within these totals the Old City's Jewish population fell from 16 to 2 thousand over the same period. According to Benny Morris, quoting a British diplomat, the nearly all-Orthodox community were "on good terms with their Arab neighbours", resented the Haganah presence, and "were loath to see their homes sacrificed to Zionist heroics". Before 1948, the quarter extended over 4 or 5 acres, and according to Rashid Khalidi, Jewish-owned property amounted to less than 20% of that.

==== December 1947 events ====
Following a battle on the 11 December 1947, the day after Jewish forces in the quarter had been reinforced by Irgun and Haganah units, the British set troops to positions between the Arabs and Jews and after this, the Old City remained largely quiet until the British evacuation.

After Irgun bomb attacks outside the Damascus Gate on 13 and 29 December 1947, resulting in the death of 18 Arabs and 86 injured including women and children, the Arabs set roadblocks outside the Old City cutting off the Jewish Quarter. The British approved this while ensuring supplies of food and the safety of the residents.

==== May 1948 cease-fire agreement ====
On April 28, 1948 Francis Sayre, the President of the United Nations Trusteeship Council announced that both Moshe Shertok of the Jewish Agency and Jamal al-Husayni of the Higher Arab Committee had agreed to recommend to their respective communities in Palestine: (a) the immediate cessation of all military operations and acts of violence within the Old City; (b) the issue of cease-fire orders to this effect at the earliest possible moment; and (c) that the keeping of the truce should be observed by an impartial commission reporting to the Trusteeship Council. At the May 3 Trusteeship Council meeting, Sayre announced that a cease-fire order had been issued the previous day. On May 7, General Cunningham, the High Commissioner met Arab League representatives including Azzam Pasha, the Secretary-General of the League and obtained approval for a cease-fire agreement covering all of Jerusalem provided that the Jews also agreed, this being forthcoming later the same day when the Haganah issued a cease-fire order to its troops in the Jerusalem area.

==== British withdrawal ====
According to a diary covering the period 12 May to July 16, 1948, of Hugh Jones, a British clergyman with Christ Church, British troops were withdrawn from their positions protecting the Jewish Quarter in the evening of May 13, 1948. Haganah forces occupied the positions vacated by the British army and the High Commissioner left Jerusalem early the next morning. Morris says that there were 90 mostly Haganah defenders, joined by 100 more after the British left their positions.

==== Fighting ====
In a letter sent to the United Nations in 1968, in response to Jordanian allegations, Israel noted that Colonel Abdullah el Tell, local commander of the Jordanian Arab Legion, described the destruction of the Jewish Quarter in his memoirs (Cairo, 1959):

"The operations of calculated destruction were set in motion. ... I knew that the Jewish Quarter was densely populated with Jews who caused their fighters a good deal of interference and difficulty. ... I embarked, therefore, on the shelling of the Quarter with mortars, creating harassment and destruction. ... Only four days after our entry into Jerusalem the Jewish Quarter had become their graveyard. Death and destruction reigned over it.... As the dawn of Friday, May 28, 1948, was about to break, the Jewish Quarter emerged convulsed in a black cloud—a cloud of death and agony."

— Abdullah el-Tal according to Yosef Tekoah (Permanent Representative of Israel to the United Nations).

Abdullah al-Tal justified the destruction of the Jewish quarter by claiming that had he not destroyed the homes, he would have lost half his men. He adds that "the systematic demolition inflicted merciless terror in the hearts of the Jews, killing both fighters and civilians."

==== Jewish surrender ====
The defenders surrendered on May 28, 1948, and Mordechai Weingarten negotiated the surrender terms.

==== Expulsion of the inhabitants ====
The Jordanian commander is reported to have told his superiors: "For the first time in 1,000 years not a single Jew remains in the Jewish Quarter. Not a single building remains intact. This makes the Jews' return here impossible."

==== Hurva and Tifereth Israel Synagogues ====
In respect of the destruction of the Hurva Synagogue, originally built in 1701, according to author Simone Ricca, Israeli, Jordanian and Palestinian sources generally present divergent versions of the events that led to the destruction of the building. Whereas Israeli sources say that the Jordanian army purposefully demolished the synagogue after the cessation of the fighting, Jordanian and Palestinian sources present the destruction of the synagogue as a direct result of the fighting that took place in the Old City.

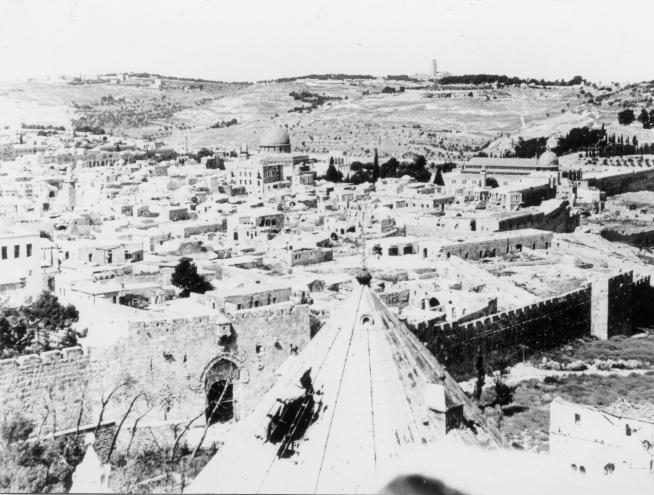
Jewish Quarter 1948

Vatikiotis writes of the diary kept by Constantine X. Mavridis of the Greek Consulate General, Jerusalem, "an eyewitness account of the contest between Arabs and Jews for the control of the Old City which went on for at least six months during the Palestine War (1948)". According to the diary:

The Arab guerrilla fighters who later joined with the Legion of Transjordan were preoccupied with clearing the Jews from the Jewish Quarter inside the Old City, who even used their own synagogues as strongholds from where attacks were made. Qawuqji and the Transjordanian army were continuously pounding the Jewish Quarter. The Tiferet Yisrael Synagogue was first destroyed, and was followed by the most famous and historic Hurva Synagogue, which was destroyed on May 27. But the Arab Headquarters had warned the Jewish Headquarters through the International Red Cross that unless the armed Jewish forces withdrew from the Synagogue within a certain time limit, they would be compelled to attack it. Since there was no reply from the Jewish side, as it was stated officially by the Red Cross, the Arabs bombed and destroyed it.

=== Jordanian period ===
==== Damage and destruction ====
According to Chief Rabbi Rabbi Isaac Herzog, speaking in Tel Aviv less than two weeks after the surrender and reported on 9 June 1948, of 27 synagogues in the Old City, 22 had been "razed by fire and explosives", with over 500 scrolls and scores of old Jewish manuscripts and sacred vessels being destroyed since the surrender date. During the following nineteen years of Jordanian rule, a third of the Jewish Quarter's buildings were demolished. This one-third destruction is doubted by British archaeologist Kay Prag, based on an aerial photograph published by Yigal Yadin in 1976. She comments that the quarter, damaged and evacuated in 1948, had been rather neglected than systematically destroyed, especially since it had been used as a home by Arab refugees. As part of a letter sent by Israel to the United Nations in 1968 in response to Jordanian complaints, it was stated all but one of the thirty-five "Jewish houses of worship" in the Old City were destroyed and that "the synagogues" were "razed or pillaged and stripped and their interiors used as hen-houses or stables." According to Dore Gold addressing the United Nations Security Council in 1998, "Fifty-eight synagogues, including the 700-year-old Hurva synagogue, were destroyed and desecrated."

==== Palestinian refugees ====
In the wake of the 1948 war, the Red Cross housed Palestinian refugees in the depopulated and partly destroyed Jewish Quarter. This grew into the Muaska refugee camp managed by UNRWA, which housed refugees from 48 locations now in Israel. Over time many poor non-refugees also settled in the camp. Conditions became unsafe for habitation due to lack of maintenance and sanitation. Jordan had planned transforming the quarter into a park, but neither UNRWA nor the Jordanian government wanted the negative international response that would result if they demolished the old Jewish houses. In 1964 a decision was made to move the refugees to a new camp constructed near Shuafat. Most of the refugees refused to move, since it would mean losing their livelihood, the market and the tourists, as well as reducing their access to the holy sites. In the end, many of the refugees were moved to Shuafat by force during 1965 and 1966. The Al-Bashura Market, today's Cardo souvenir market, specialised in selling second-hand clothing.

=== State of Israel ===
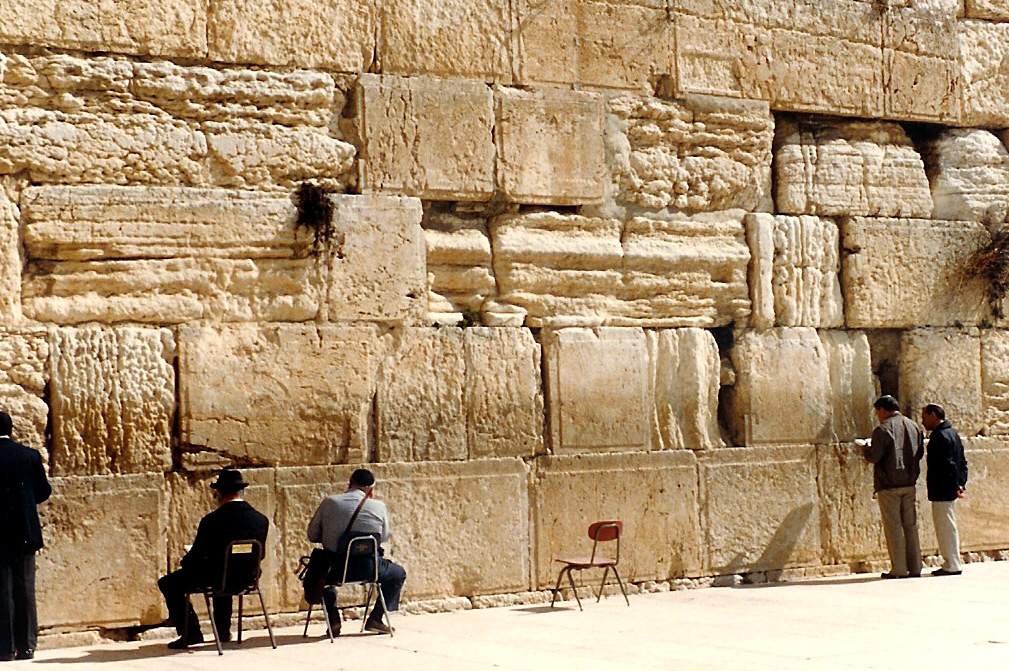
The Western Wall

The Jewish Quarter remained under Jordanian rule until the Six-Day War in June 1967 when Israel occupied it. During the first week after taking the Old City, Israel dynamited the Mughrabi Quarter, demolishing 135 houses, and two mosques on waqf property and evicting the 650 Arab residents in order that, on the razed ground, a plaza could be created at the foot of the Western Wall.

On 18 April 1968, the Israeli minister of finance, Pinchas Sapir, issued an order for the expropriation of 29 acres (116 dunums) extending from the Western Wall to the Armenian Quarter, and from Tariq Bab al-Silsilah in the north, to the city's southern walls. 700 stone buildings were subject to the expropriation. Of these 105 had been Jewish properties before 1948. The remainder was Palestinian property, comprising 1,048 apartments and 437 workshops and business stores. The aim, stated to be assuming land for "public purposes", was to establish residences for an Israeli Jewish community. In 1969, the Jewish Quarter Development Company was established under the auspices of the Construction and Housing Ministry to rebuild the desolate Jewish Quarter.

According to an article by Thomas Abowd in the Jerusalem Quarterly (Hawliyat al-Quds), the Arab population of the quarter reached approximately 1,000, most of whom were refugees who had appropriated the evacuated Jewish houses in 1949. Although many had originally fled the Quarter in 1967, they later returned after Levi Eshkol ordered that the Arab residents not be forcefully evacuated from the area. With Menachem Begin's rise to power in 1977, he decided that 25 Arab families be allowed to remain in the Jewish Quarter as a gesture of good will, while the rest of the families who had not fled during the Six-Day War were offered compensation in return for their evacuation, although most declined. The quarter was rebuilt in keeping with the traditional standards of the dense urban fabric of the Old City. Residents of the quarter hold long-term leases from the Israel Lands Administration. As of 2004 the quarter's population stood at 2,348 and many large educational institutions have taken up residence.

Beginning in the years immediately after 1967, around 6,000 Arabs were evicted from the Jewish Quarter, and the start of exclusion of Palestinians from appropriated land by the private company in charge of its development, for the reason that they were not Jewish. This later became legal precedent in 1978 when the Supreme Court made a decision in the case of Mohammed Burqan, in which the Court ruled that, while Burqan did own his home, he could not return because the area had "special historical significance" to the Jewish people.

== Archaeology ==
=== Settlement periods; excavations ===
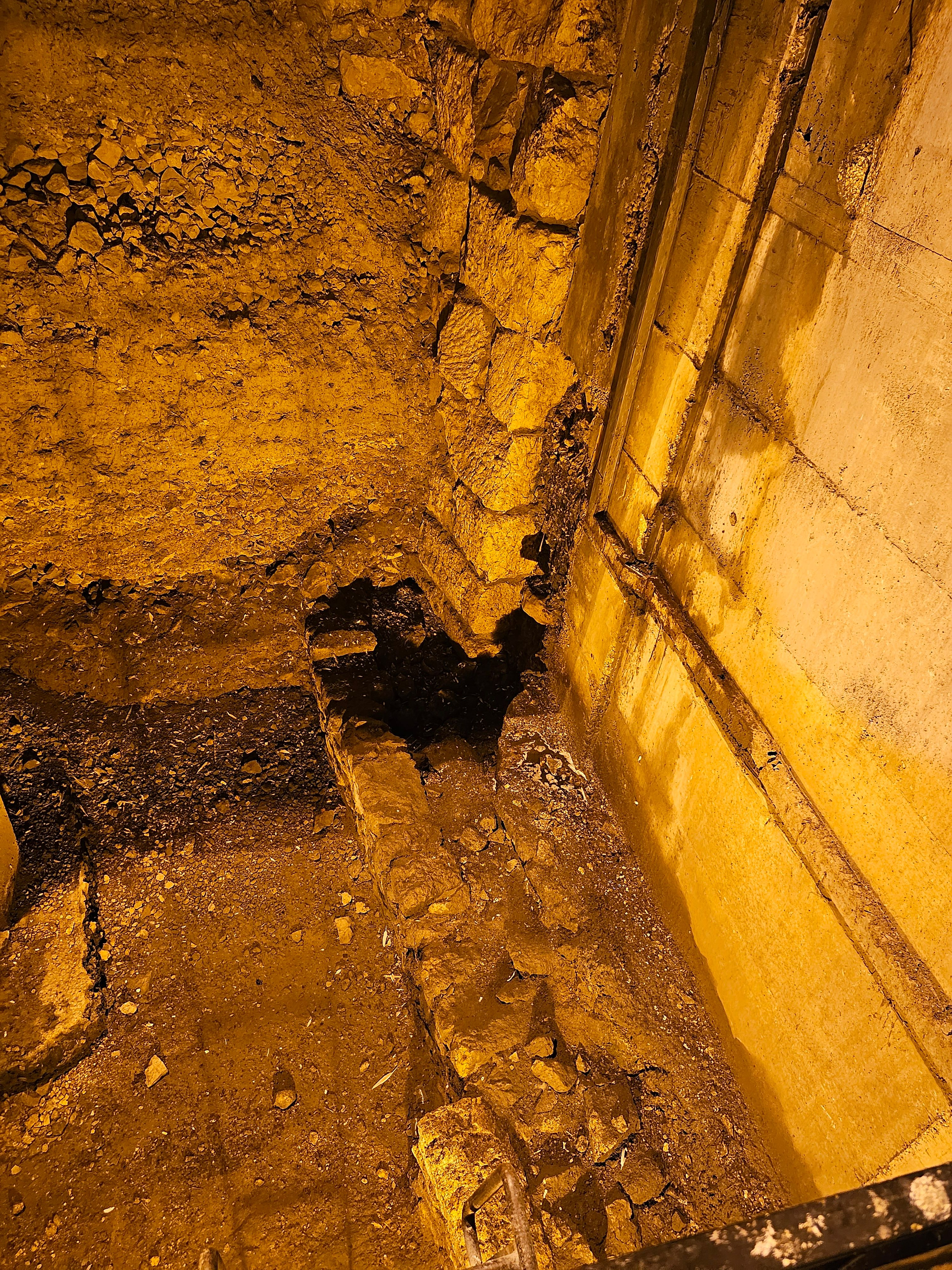
A section of Hasmonean (c. 2nd–1st century BCE) city wall, sitting atop ruins of a First Temple-period (c. 8th century BCE) wall.

The area in which the modern Jewish Quarter now stands is the western hill of the historical Old City, which has been part of the pre-medieval walled city twice: during the First Temple period between the reign of King Hezekiah around 700 BCE and the destruction by Nabuchadnezzar in 586 BCE, and again from the Hasmonean period to the Roman destruction of 70 CE. This was documented after 1967, when before being rebuilt, the quarter was partially excavated under the supervision of Hebrew University archaeologist Nahman Avigad. Some archaeological remains were left in situ and made accessible, either in outdoor parks, or in a series of museums set up between one and three storeys beneath the level of the current city.

=== First Temple period ===
Among the First Temple period finds were portions of the 8th and 7th century BCE city walls, in the area of the Israelite Tower, probably including parts of a gate where numerous projectiles were found, attesting to the Babylonian sack of Jerusalem in 586 BCE. Another part of the late 8th-century BCE fortification discovered was dubbed the "broad wall", after the way it was described in the Book of Nehemiah, built to defend Jerusalem against the Assyrian siege of Jerusalem of 701 BCE.

=== Second Temple period ===
From the Second Temple period Avigad unearthed a palatial mansion from the Herodian period, possibly the residence of Annas the High Priest. In its vicinity archaeologists found a depiction of the Temple menorah, carved while its model still stood in the Temple, engraved in a plastered wall. The palace has been destroyed during the final days of the Roman siege of 70 CE, suffering the same fate as the so-called Burnt House, a building belonging to the Kathros priestly family.

=== Roman period ===
In 2010, Israeli archaeologists uncovered a pool built by the Roman Tenth Legion "Fretensis". The dig uncovered steps leading to the pool, a white mosaic floor and hundreds of terracotta roof tiles stamped with the name of the Roman unit, indicating that the pool had been roofed over. It may have been part of a larger complex where thousands of soldiers once bathed and suggests that the Roman city was larger than previously thought.

=== Byzantine period ===
Avigad's dig also unearthed the remains of the Byzantine Nea Church, standing along the Byzantine southern section of the cardo maximus, a 22.5-metre (74 ft)-wide road (a 12.5 m wide street bordered by pavements each 5 m wide) flanked by shops which also passed by the Constantinian Church of the Resurrection further to the north.

=== Early Muslim (Abbasid) period ===
An Arabic inscription, unearthed in the Jewish Quarter in 2010, dates back to 910 CE and commemorates the granting of an estate in Jerusalem by the Abbasid Caliph.

== Landmarks ==
Map of the Jewish Quarter(2010)

=== Archaeological sites ===
- Broad Wall – 8th-century BCE city wall segment
- Burnt House – mansion of the Kathros/Qatros priestly family, burnt down in 70 CE
- Cardo – ancient Byzantine street
- Herodian Quarter – Wohl Archaeological Museum with the palatial Herodian mansion, burnt down in 70 CE
- Israelite Tower – Iron Age fortifications, later incorporated into the Hasmonean city walls
- Nea Church – remains of huge 6th-century Byzantine church
- Church of Saint Mary of the Germans – remains of a 12th-century Crusader church

=== Apartment buildings ===
- Batei Mahse
- "The Chush" or "the Hush", compound of residential courtyards dating from the early 1800s, restored in 1977 by the Israeli architect Moshe Safdie

=== Markets ===
- Cardo market
- Hurva Square

=== Mosques ===
- Sidna Omar Mosque (not in use)
- Al Dissi Mosque (not in use)

=== Museums ===
- Old Yishuv Court Museum
- Siebenberg House
- Wohl Archaeological Museum

=== Yeshivas ===
- Aish HaTorah
- Beit El Kabbalist yeshiva
- Bircas HaTorah
- Porat Yosef Yeshiva
- Yeshivat HaKotel (Western Wall Yeshiva)
- Yeshivat Netiv Aryeh

=== Other ===
- The Temple Institute, aiming at building a third Jewish temple on the Temple Mount. Runs a Temple museum in the Jewish Quarter.
- Metivta Sephardic Center
- Midreshet HaRova

== Gallery ==
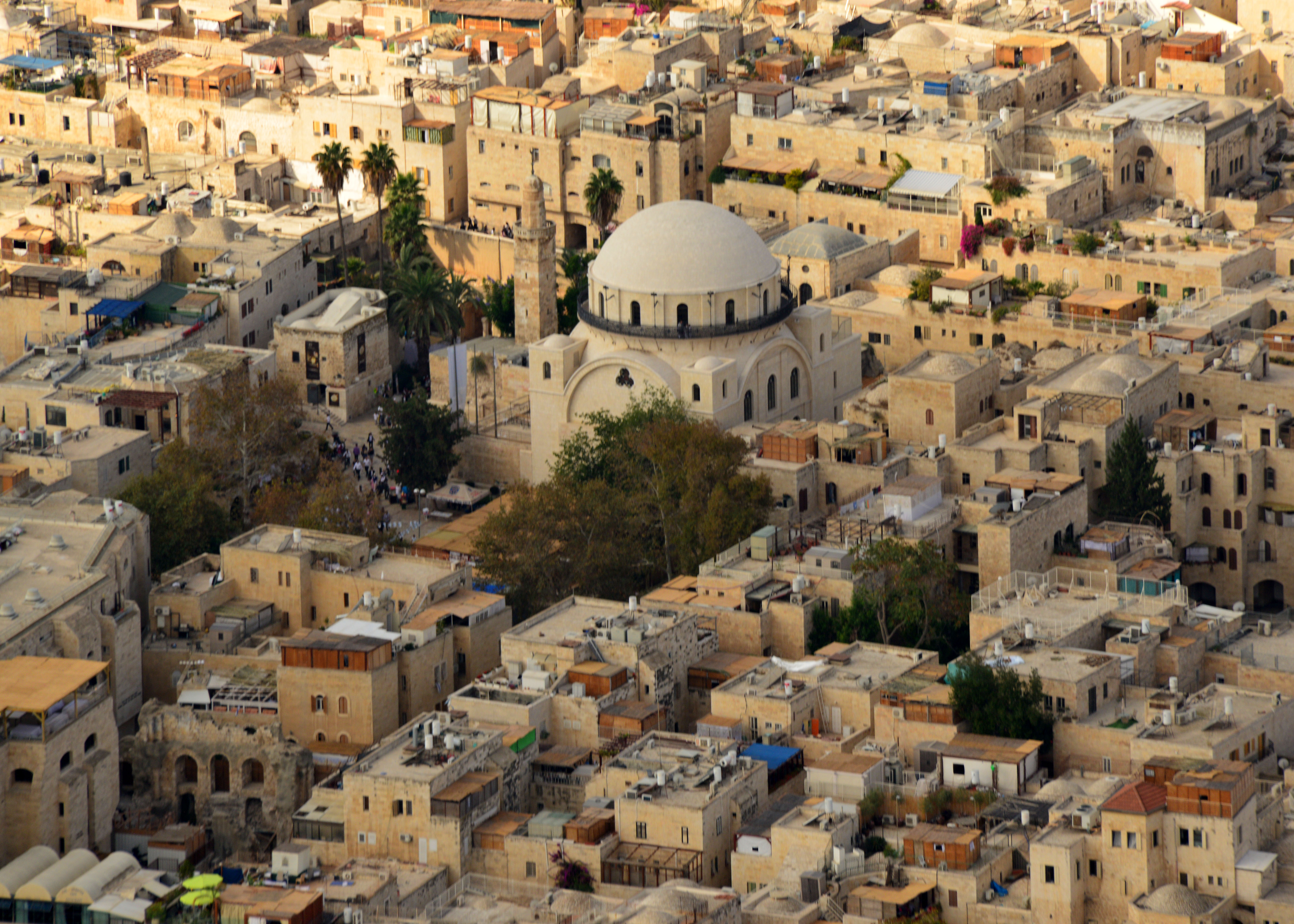
Hurva Synagogue and Sidna Omar mosque in the Jewish Quarter

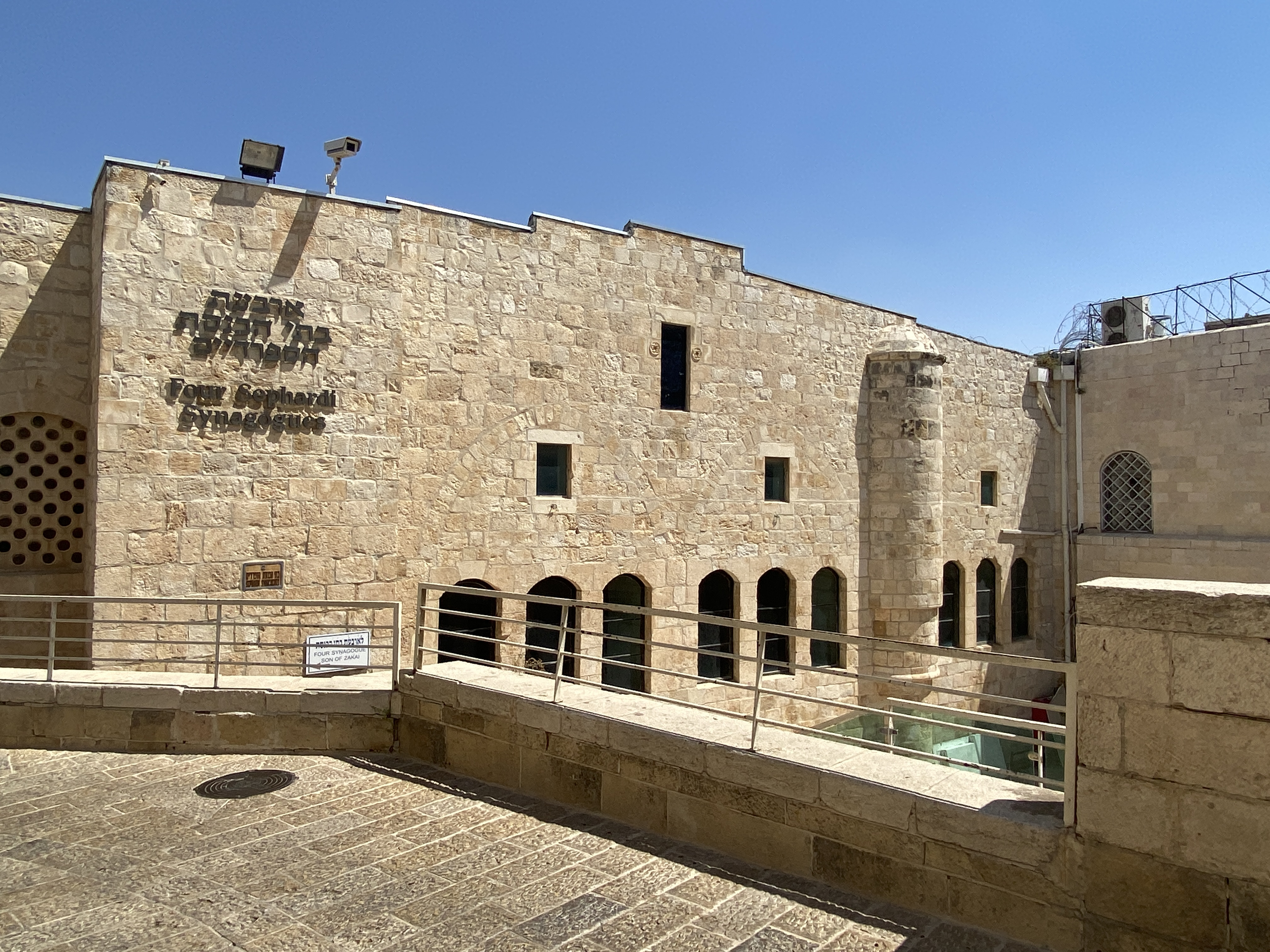
Four Sephardic Synagogues

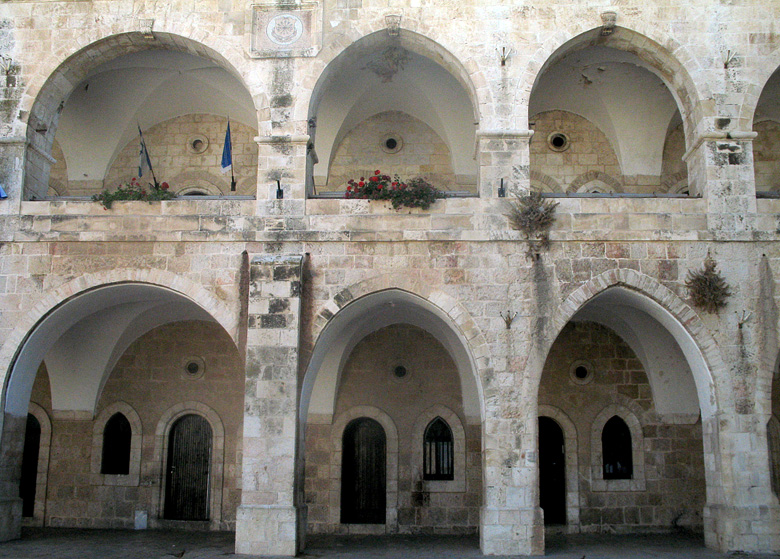
Rothschild House (1871), part of Batei Mahse complex (1860–1890)

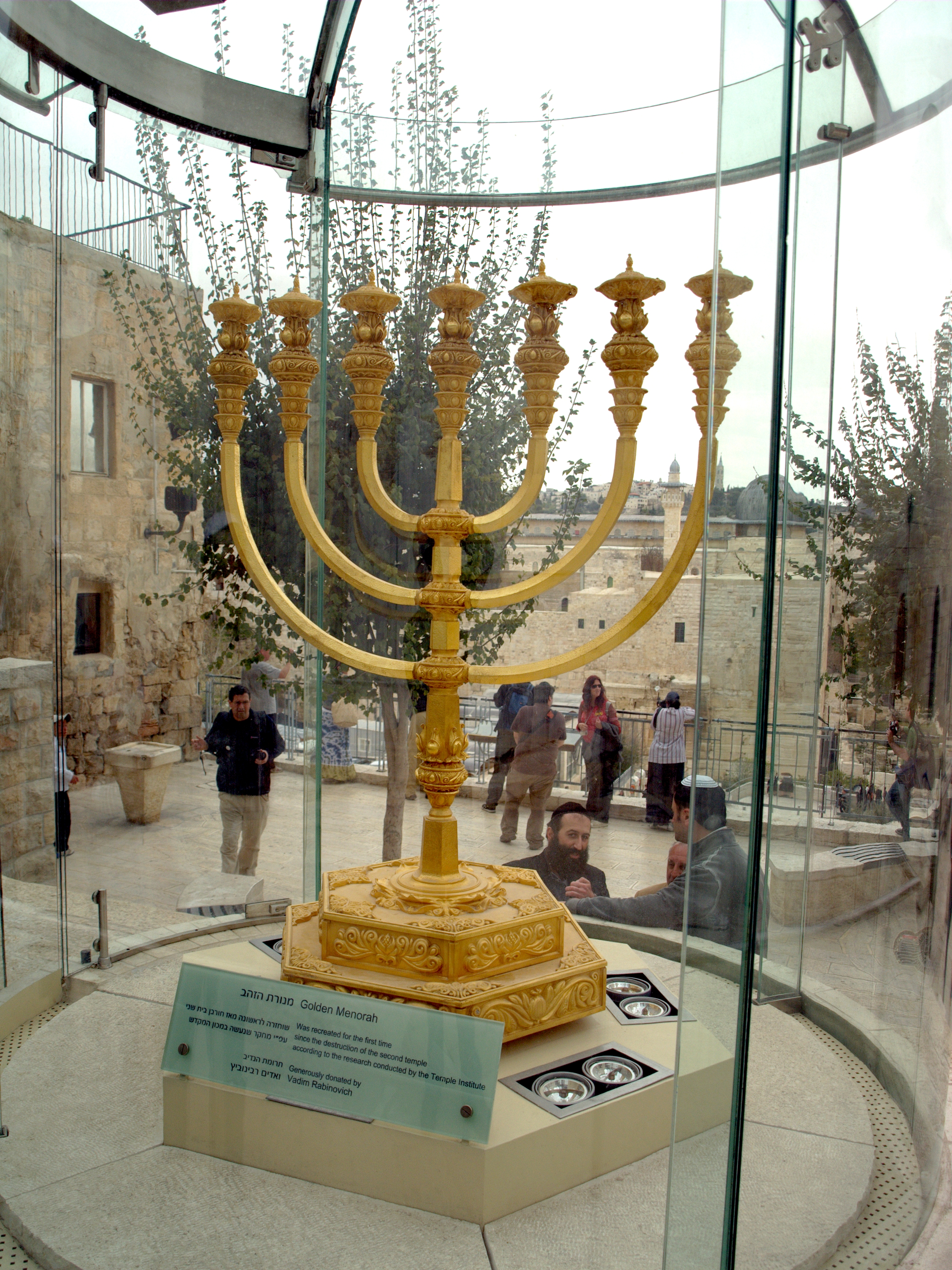
The Temple Institute's vision of the Temple menorah

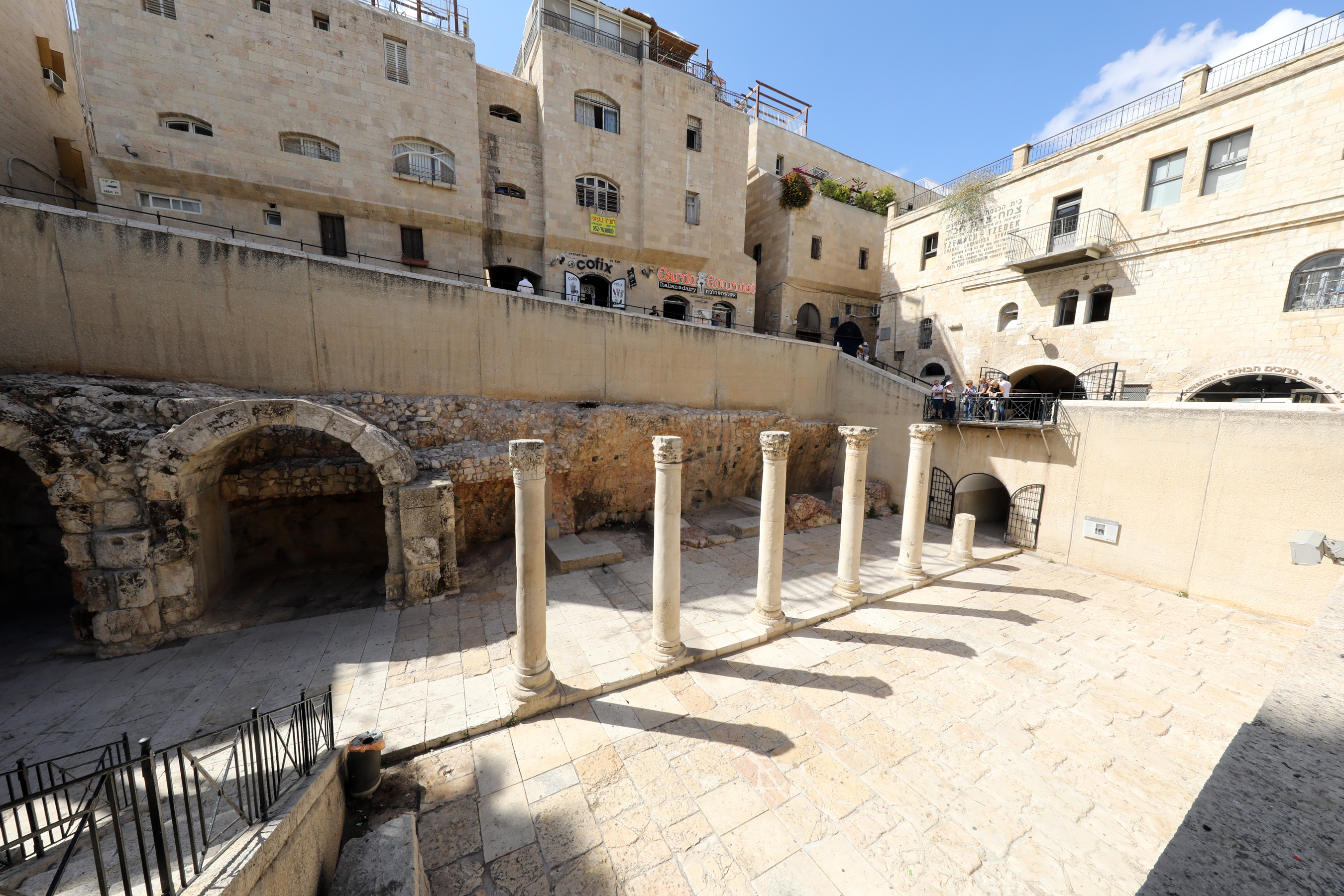
Cardo Maximus

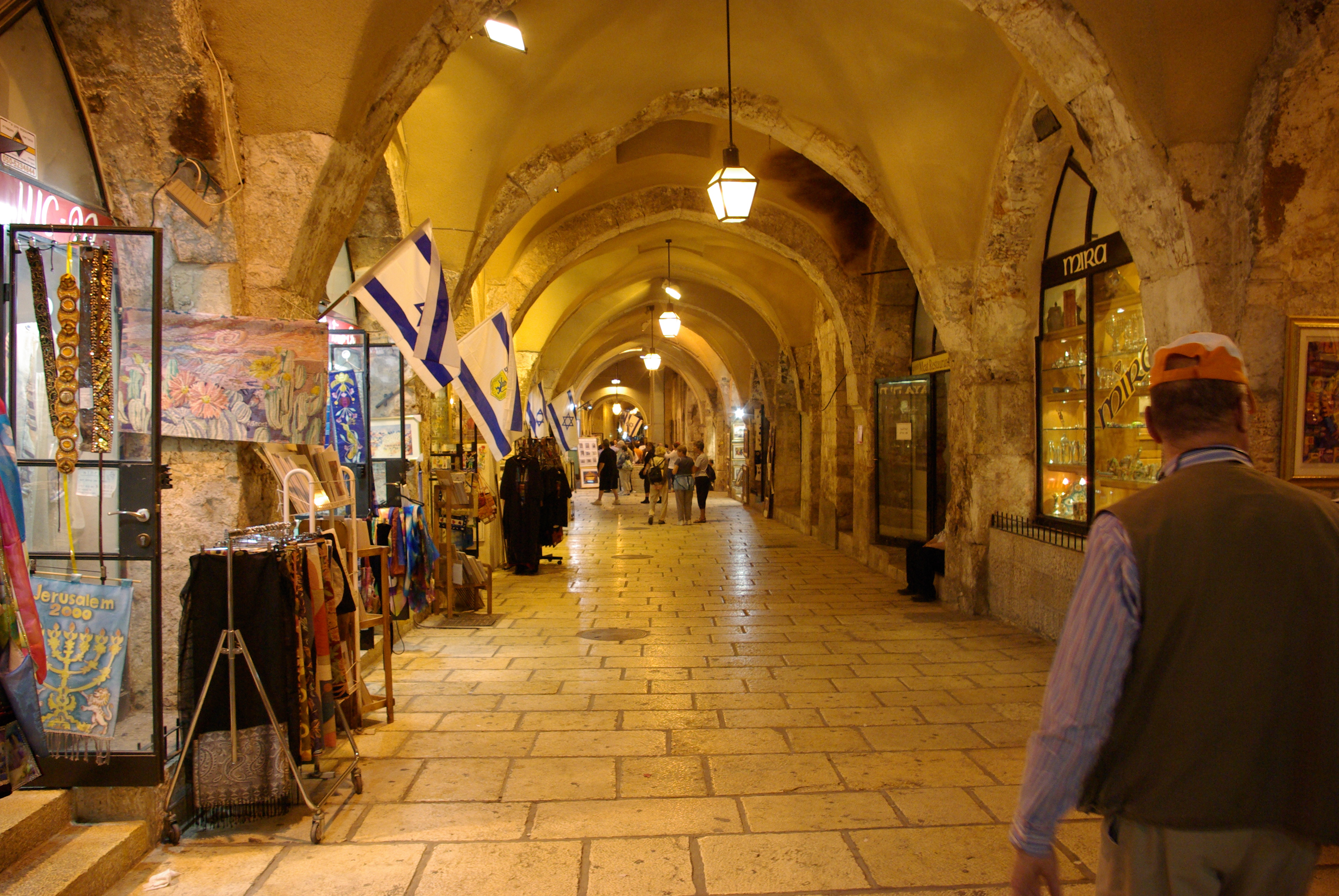
Covered section of the Crusader Cardo

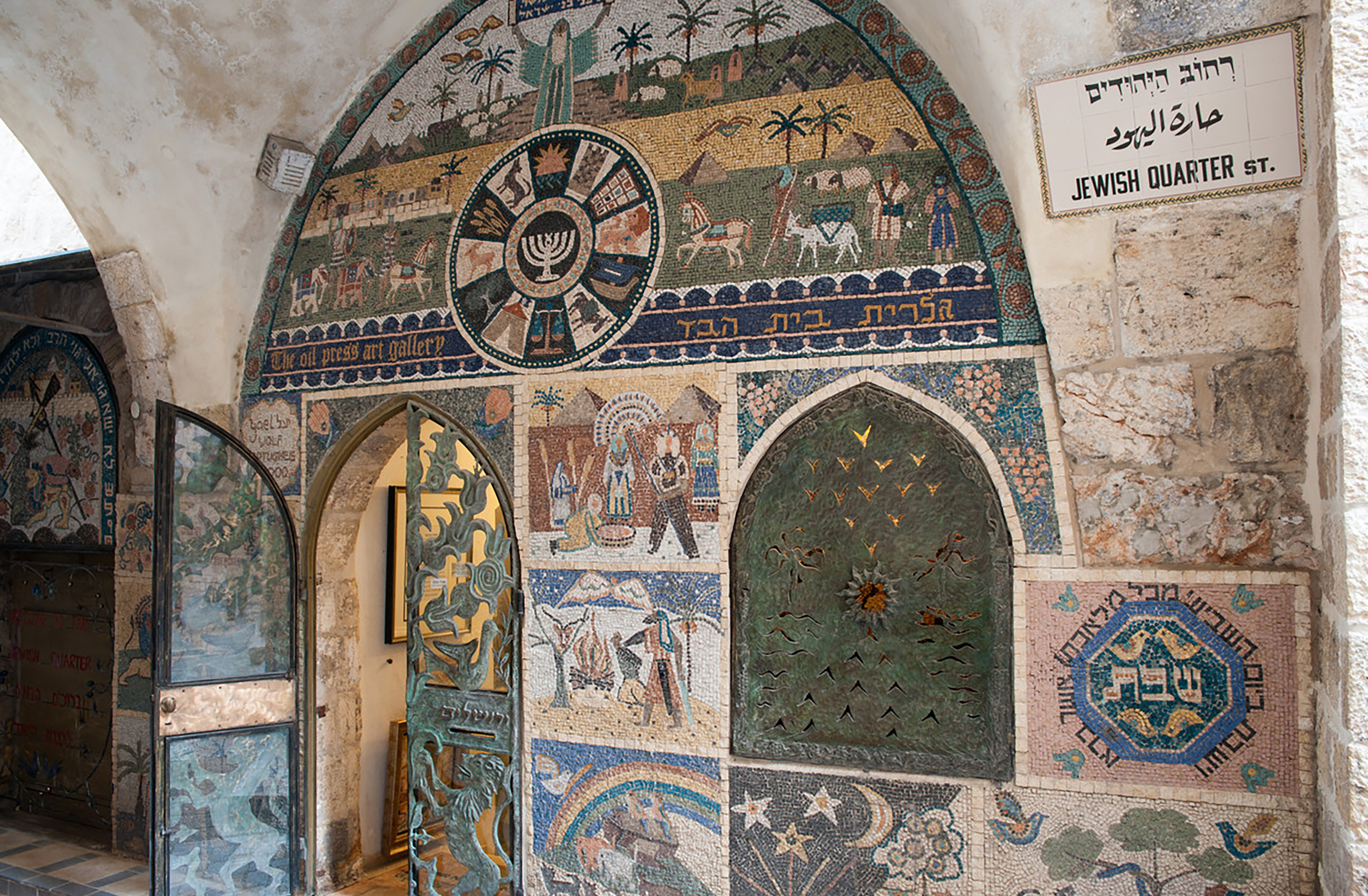
"The oil press art gallery" with mosaics by Yael Portugheis

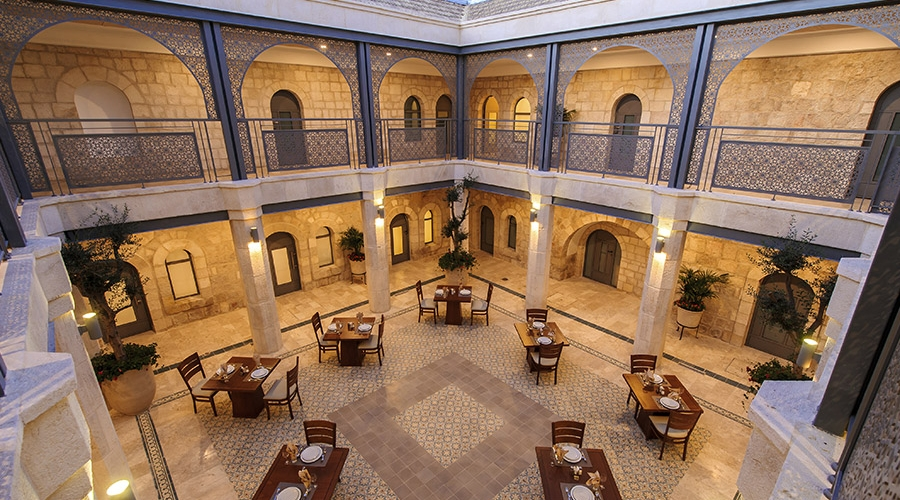
The Spanish-style patio (courtyard) of the Sephardic House (the hotel run by the Sephardic Educational Center)

== Bibliography ==
- Bell, J. Bowyer (29 September 2017). Besieged: Seven Cities Under Siege. Taylor & Francis. ISBN 978-1-351-31410-7.
- Collins, Larry; Lapierre, Dominique (15 May 1988). O Jerusalem. Simon and Schuster. ISBN 978-0-671-66241-7.
- Gurney, Henry (2009). Golani, Motti (ed.). The End of the British Mandate for Palestine, 1948: The Diary of Sir Henry Gurney. Palgrave Macmillan. ISBN 9780230244733.
- Murphy-O'Connor, Jerome (2008). The Holy Land: An Oxford Archaeological Guide from Earliest Times to 1700. Oxford Archaeological Guides. Oxford: Oxford University Press. ISBN 978-0-19-923666-4.
