= New Church of the Theotokos =

Byzantine church erected in Jerusalem by Emperor Justinian I (r. 527–565)

Coordinates: 31°46′24.3″N 35°13′53.64″E

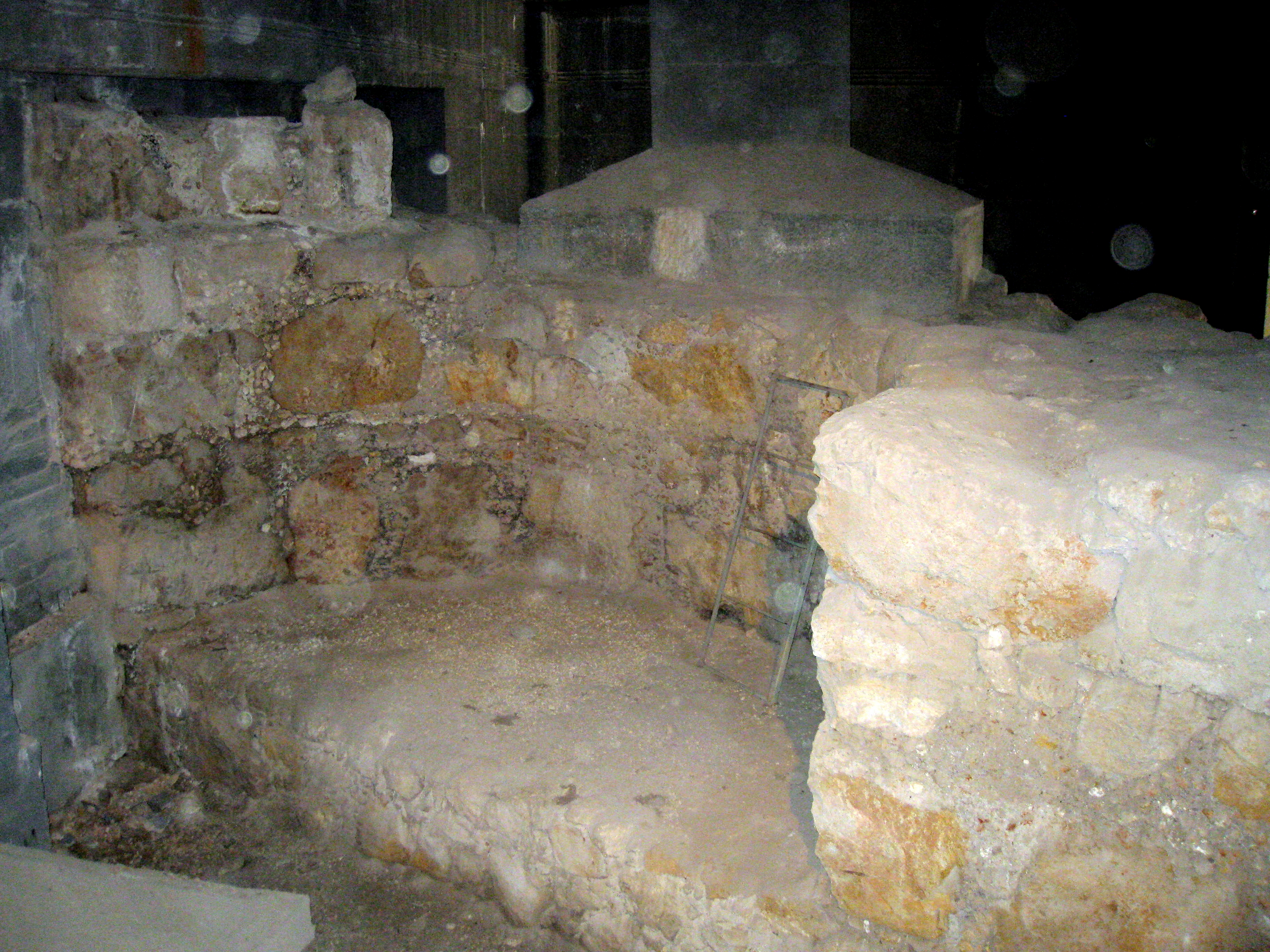
Remains of the Nea

The New Church of the Theotokos, or New Church of the Mother of God, was a Byzantine church erected in Jerusalem by Emperor Justinian I. It is sometimes referred to in English as "the Nea" or the "Nea Church" (Greek: Νέα Ἐκκλησία). The church was completed in 543 but was severely damaged or destroyed during the Persian conquest of the city in 614. It was used as a source of building material by the Umayyads a few decades later. Meager remains of the church were discovered during excavations in the Old City's Jewish Quarter, with the southeast corner slightly protruding outside the 16th-century city walls.

== Primary sources ==
Two contemporary accounts survive that describe the building of the Nea, but neither author has much to say about the shape and organization of the church complex. Cyril of Scythopolis, a Christian monk who lived in 525–558, records that the church was begun by the Patriarch Elias but left unfinished until Justinian allocated funds for its completion at the behest of St. Sabas in 531. A more detailed account of the church and its construction comes from Procopius, the principal historian of the sixth century and the primary source of information for the rule of the Emperor Justinian. In his De Aedificiis, he writes that "in Jerusalem he [Justinian] dedicated to the Mother of God a shrine with which no other can be compared." The Nea was situated on Mount Zion, the highest hill in the city, near the Church of the Holy Apostles (built in 347) and the Basilica of Hagia Sion (built in 390). Due to the rugged topography, the architect Theodoros first had to extend the southeastern part of the hill and support the church with huge substructures. This account by Procopius corresponds with the excavations of Yoram Tsafrir, as well as a tablet uncovered on the vaulted subterranean cistern that securely dates the building to 543.

== Form and function of the Nea ==
The Nea was a building of great complexity. Although the longitudinal basilican structure was a relatively common typology for sixth-century churches in Palestine, the forecourt's arrangement, along with the placement of the adjoining hostel, hospital, and monastery remains problematic. According to Procopius, exterior porticoes on the south, west, and northern sides surrounded the structure. Two huge columns stood in front of the western entrance, which was preceded by a colonnaded atrium. In front of the atrium was a round courtyard that opened onto the Cardo. Due to the sparse archaeological evidence and the obscurity of Procopius’ description, this plan is difficult to reconstruct. Despite the obscurity of literary details, Tsafrir has proposed that west of the atrium, there were monumental gates that opened into an area that contained a gatehouse and an arch. Beyond this, Tsafrir has hypothesized two semicircles: one would have connected the church complex to the Cardo, while the other was located across the street and provided access to the hospital and hospice.

In the interior of the church, the nave terminated at a large apse that was flanked by two symmetrical smaller rooms with apses inscribed in their eastern walls. It is unclear whether the nave of the Nea had three or five aisles, but due to the unprecedentedly large dimensions of the church (approximately 100 m long by 52 m wide), archaeologists Yoram Tsafrir and Nahman Avigad both agree that while only two rows of interior columns have been uncovered, two additional rows would have likely been needed to adequately support the roofing structure. In addition to being the largest known basilica in Palestine, the Nea also included a monastery, hostel, and hospital, as attested by Antoninus of Piacenza, who visited the basilica of St. Mary in 570, "with its great congregation of monks, and its guest houses for men and women. In catering for travelers they have a vast number of tables, and more than three thousand beds for the sick."

== The Nea and the Madaba Map ==
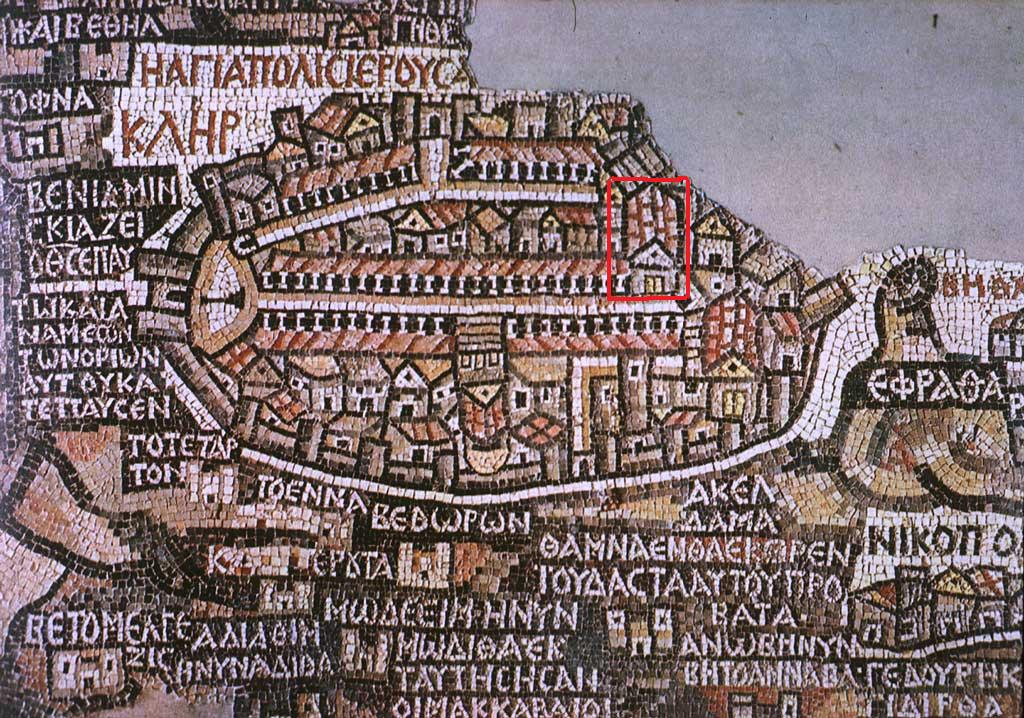
The Nea on the Madaba Map, showing its location along the Cardo Maximus thoroughfare is evident.

=== Providing hierarchies ===
The selective details of Jerusalem's monuments reveal the Madaba Map to be concerned with providing the viewer with a topographical hierarchy of Old and New Testament places. When viewed as a rendition of Jerusalem that is reflective of the sixth century habitus of Jerusalem, the map reveals a conception of the Christian sacred spaces and their interconnectedness. The shift in Christian topography to the western part of the city is clearly visible. For example, the Temple Mount, the central religious monument to Jewish identity, is relegated to the eastern periphery of the city, eclipsed by the towering Christian monuments that occupy the center of the city. Yoram Tsafrir has identified this area to be an open esplanade, marking the place of the Temple Mount.

The map provides a guide for pilgrims and viewers to the holy spaces, supporting Justinian's campaign to integrate the Nea as a sacred site that matched the holiness of the Holy Sepulchre and Hagia Sion.

== Significance ==
According to Graham (2008), "The Nea gave architectural articulation to a theological opinion or theologoumenon in Jerusalem, and conveyed, architecturally, a message regarding Justinian's imperial policy, imperial presence in Palestine, and a self-conception as a Christian emperor."

Israeli archaeologist Oren Gutfeld believes, based on the results of excavations led by Avigad, that it was Justinian who extended the old Roman Cardo southwards specifically for creating a processional way connecting his Nea Church, with the more important, but smaller Church of the Resurrection (today's Holy Sepulchre Church). Gutfeld also thinks that Justinian built the Nea in the south of the city to balance the Church of the Resurrection further up north.

In order to provide access to the Nea, Justinian extended the cardo south to the Nea and the newly constructed Zion Gate. This decision undoubtedly had political motivations, for it situated the Nea on the main route for pilgrims traveling between the Church of the Holy Sepulchre and the Church of the Holy Apostles. Processions, stational liturgies, and individual worshipers passed between the Holy Sepulchre and Hagia Sion, thus including Justinian's church, but the Nea still failed to gain a place in the Christian collective memory as a site that was as holy as the other two main churches. According to Antoninus of Piacenza, worshipers went straight from the Holy Sepulchre to Hagia Sion, only to double back to the Nea. Furthermore, by the 630s, Patriarch Sophronius does not even mention the Nea in his review of pilgrimage sites in Jerusalem.

=== The Nea and Solomon's Temple ===
Justinian attempted to leave his imperial mark on Jerusalem by situating a building of unprecedented size and splendor within the context of Jerusalem's oldest and most sacred monuments. Procopius's panegyric, the de Aedificiis (English: "Buildings"), is perhaps the richest source that survives which offers possible motivations for Justinian's architectural restructuring of Jerusalem. A masterful work of propaganda, de Aedificiis was less concerned with extolling the greatness of the buildings that were constructed, and more so with celebrating the man who built them. In order to situate Justinian within the tradition of grand builders in Jerusalem, Procopius most likely modeled his account after the biblical narrative of Solomon's Temple. There are several literary parallels between the two accounts, the most foremost being that, according to Procopius, both of the building projects were blessed by God. Furthermore, it seems beyond coincidence that the measurements of the Nea are roughly twice the size of the Temple.

Like Herod's engineers, who had to extend the southern end of the Temple platform, so too did Justinian's architects; and just as Solomon imported cedars from Hiram of Tyre for the Temple's roofing, Justinian had cedars brought in from Lebanon. Procopius alludes to the monumental columns Jachim and Boaz that flanked the entrance into the Temple when describing those that decorated the entrance into the Nea.

== The demise of the Nea ==
The date of the destruction of the Nea Church is not known precisely. According to accounts preserved in The Capture of Jerusalem (Expugnationis Hierosolymae) the conquering Persians and their Jewish allies destroyed the church and killed the clergy in 614. The extent of the damage is unclear as Patriarch Sophronius delivered his Nativity sermon in the Nea Church in 634. Further damage to the church may have occurred from an earthquake in 746. In 808, a reference to the church appeared in the Commemoratorium de casis Dei and, in 870, it was mentioned by Bernard the Monk who stayed in a hospice next to the church. In the tenth century, Eutychius, the Melkite Patriarch of Alexandria, noted the Nea Church ruins. The damage by the Persians, in 614, may have been severe as the Persians may have searched for treasure believed stored within the church as speculated from Procopius' report of the Emperor Justinian sending sacred items to Jerusalem.

== See also ==
- Jerusalem in Christianity

== Bibliography ==
- Ben-Dov, Meir. "Found After 1400 Years—The Magnificent Nea", Biblical Archaeology Review, December 1977
- Cyril of Scythopolis, The life of Euthymius (Vita Euthymii)
- Graham, Susan (2008). "Justinian and the Politics of Space". Jon L. Berquist and Claudia V. Camp, eds. Constructions of Space II: The Biblical City and Other Imagined Spaces. New York: T & T Clark.
- Gutfeld, Oren. "The Emperor's New Church on Main Street, Jerusalem". BAR. Vol. 39, no. 6 (Nov/Dec 2013). Biblical Archaeology Society – via "Who Built the Cardo in Jerusalem?", presentation of Gutfeld's article by Robin Ngo, 15 Nov. 2013.
- Josephus, The Jewish War
- Piacenza Pilgrim, Itinerary.
- Procopius, De Aedificiis (Buildings), book 5, chapter 6.
- Sophronius of Jerusalem. Anacreontica: Anacreontic 20
- Taylor, Joan E.: "The Nea Church", Biblical Archaeology Review, Jan/Feb 2008, Vol 34, No 1, pp. 51–59.
- Trampedach, Kai (2015): "Ein neuer Tempel Salomons in Jerusalem? Der Bau der Nea-Kirche (531–543) durch Kaiser Justinian." Millennium 12, pp. 155–178, DOI:10.1515/mill-2015-0107.
- Tsafrir, Yoram (1999). "The Holy City of Jerusalem in the Madaba Map". In The Madaba Map Centenary 1897-1997, ed. by Michele Piccirillo and Eugenio Alliata, Jerusalem.
- Tsafrir, Yoram (2000). "Procopius and the Nea Church in Jerusalem". Antiquité Tardive 8, pp. 149–164.
