= Burnt House =

Museum in Jerusalem

The Burnt House
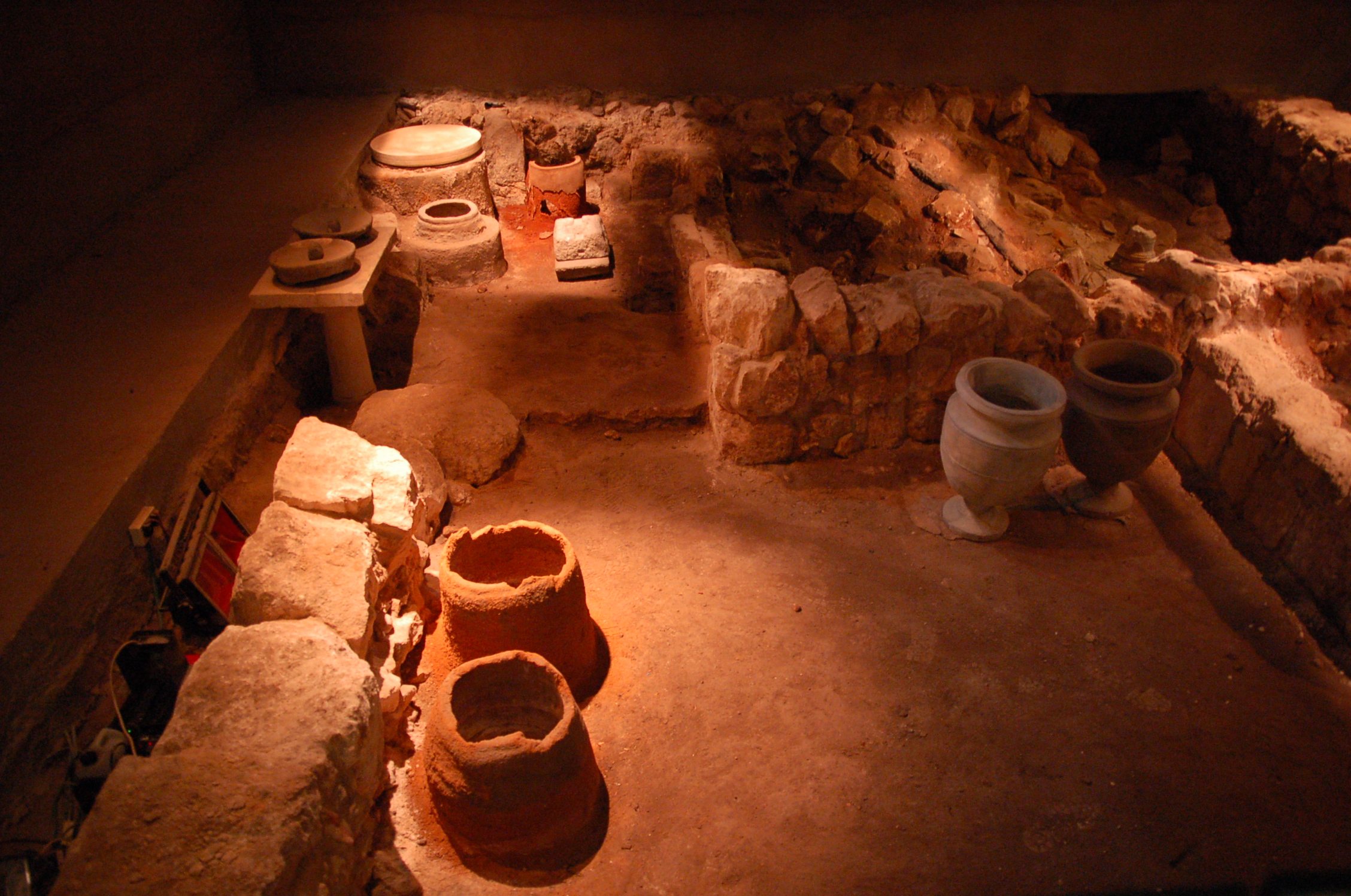
- Photo from the museum
- Interactive fullscreen map
- Established: 1988
- Location: 2 Tiferet Israel Street; Jewish Quarter; Jerusalem, West Bank
- Coordinates: 31.775°N 35.232°E
- Type: Archaeological museum, audio-visual experience
- Key holdings: Priestly mansions of the Late Second Temple period
- Public transit access: Western Wall
- Website: travelrova.co.il/thr-burnt-house/

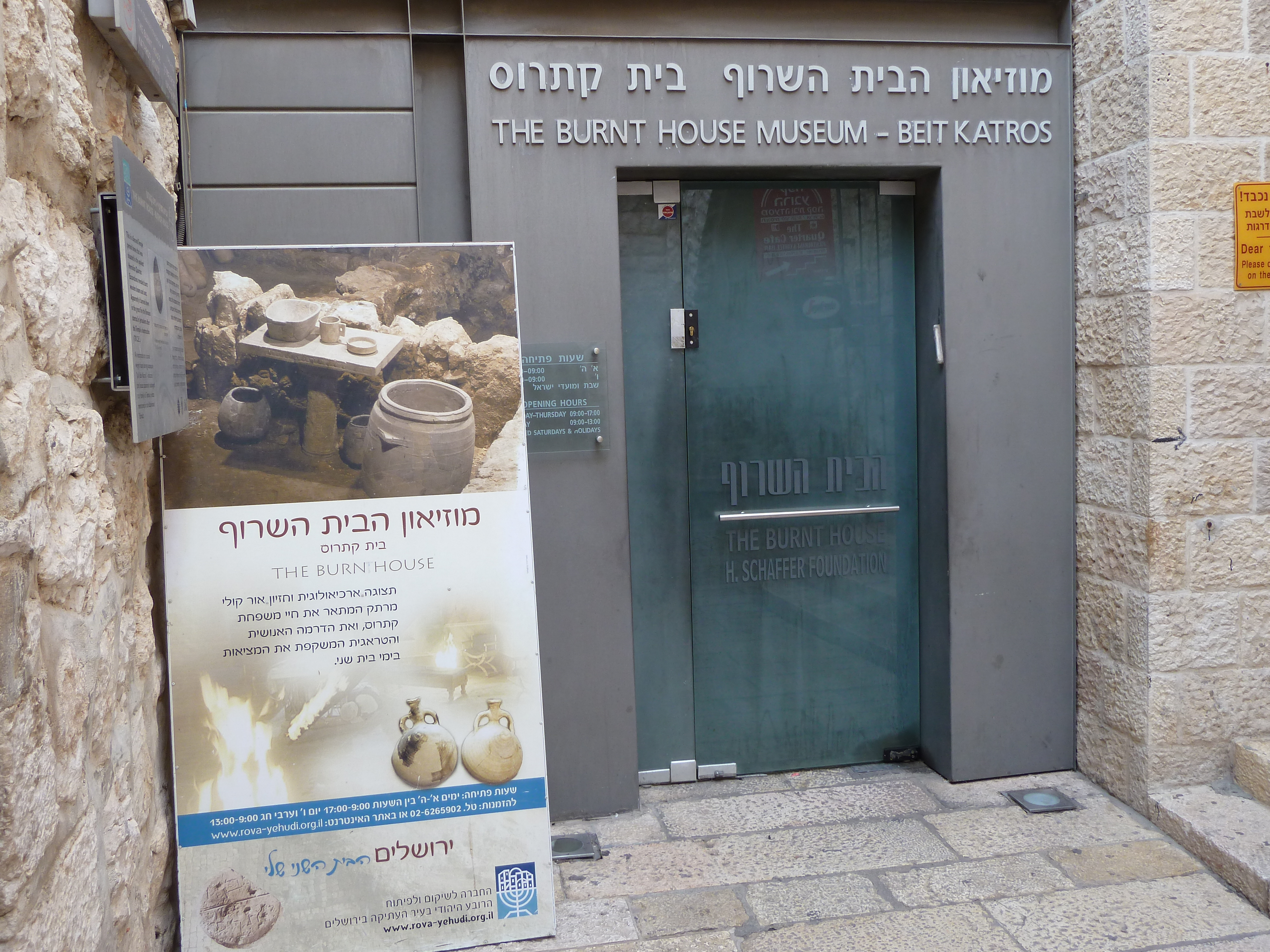
Entrance to the Burnt House Museum.

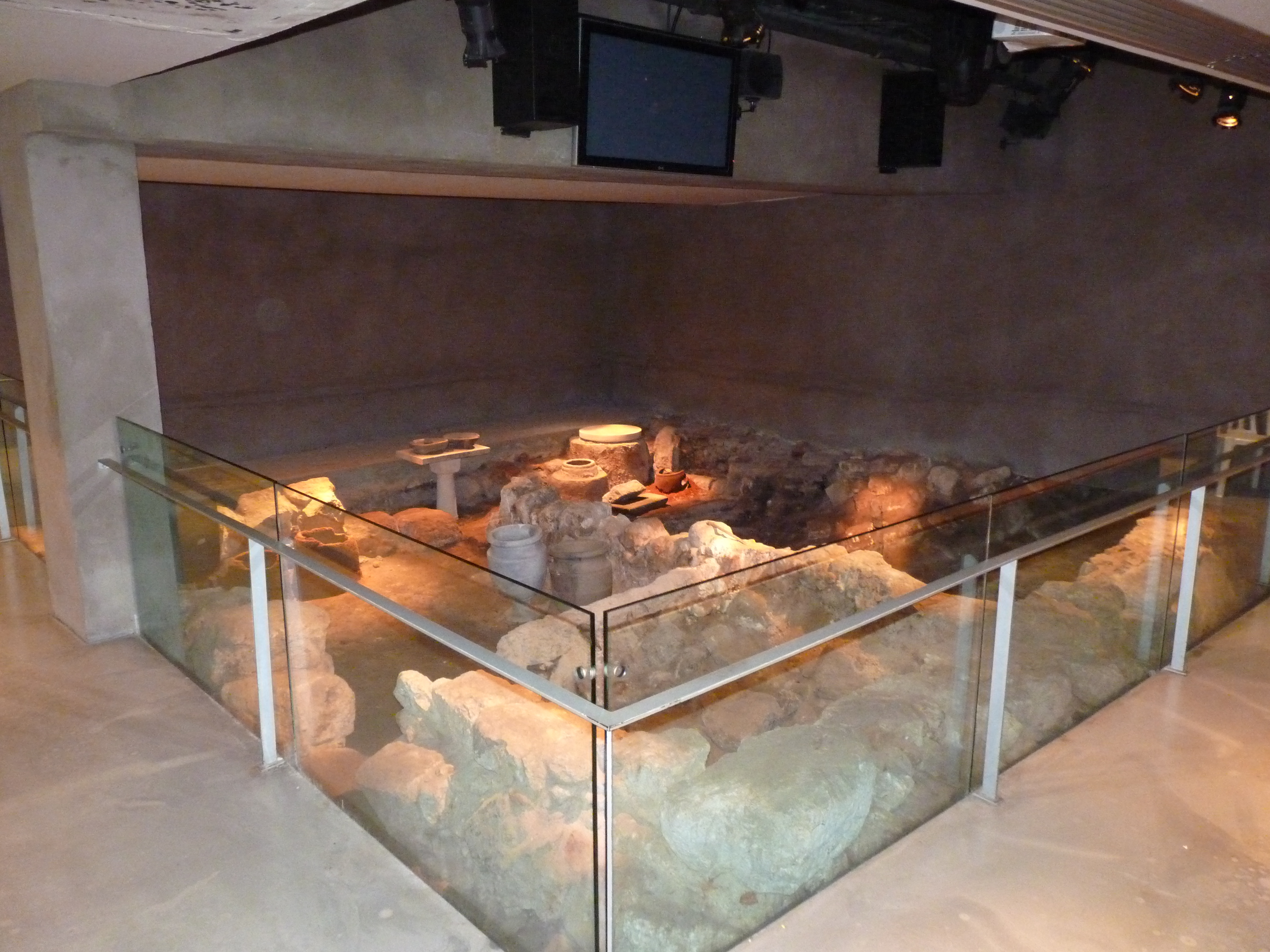
View of the excavated house.

Map of Jerusalem's Jewish Quarter showing the Burnt House.

The Burnt House Museum (a.k.a. Katros House) is a museum in Jerusalem presenting an excavated house from the Second Temple period. It is situated 6 m (20 ft) below current street level in the Jewish Quarter of the Old City.

The house was destroyed in a great fire during the Roman siege of Jerusalem in 70 CE. Artifacts found include coins minted between 67 and 69 CE, stone vessels indicating adherence to purity laws, glass perfume containers, and an inscribed stone weight linking the house to the Katros family, a priestly family mentioned in the Talmud. Evidence of destruction by fire includes burnt stones, charred wood, and layers of ash and soot, as well as a young woman's lower arm skeleton and an iron spear.

The museum displays the house's ruins, archaeological finds, and a 25-minute video that reconstructs the life of the priestly family and their experiences during the Great Jewish Revolt and the destruction of the city.

== History ==
The Burnt House was set on fire during the final stages of the Roman destruction of Jerusalem in 70 CE, specifically during the destruction of the Upper City in September 70. According to Josephus, Jerusalem's Upper City was known for its wealth. It was located close to the Second Temple and inhabited by priestly families who served in the temple. The house was destroyed one month after the Temple and Lower City. When the Romans stormed the Upper City, they found little resistance: Much of the population was near death from disease and starvation.

== Archaeological excavations ==
Following the 1967 reunification of Jerusalem the Jewish quarter was rebuilt, and extensive archeological excavations were conducted in the area. The excavations were carried out from 1969 to 1982 under the auspices of the Institute of Archaeology of the Hebrew University of Jerusalem, the Israel Exploration Society and the Israel Department of Antiquities (today, the Israel Antiquities Authority). The excavations were headed by Dr Nahman Avigad.

=== Findings ===
In 1970, one of the findings of the Avigad excavations was the Burnt House, which was found under a layer of ashes and destruction, indicating that the house had been burned down.

The house is only part of a large complex, which could not be fully excavated and still lies under the Jewish Quarter. Coins were found in the house issued by the Roman governors of Judea, as well as those issued by the Jewish rebels in 67–69 CE, and none that were later than that, indicating that the house was burned down at the end of this time.

==== Outline, rooms ====
The ground floor of the Burnt House was exposed to reveal a house with an area of about 55 (32 ft) square. It included a small courtyard, four rooms, a kitchen and a mikvah (ritual bath). The walls of the house, built of stones and cement and covered with a thick white plaster, were preserved to a height of about one meter. In the beaten-earth floors of the rooms were the sunken bases of round ovens made of brown clay, indicating perhaps that this wing of the house was used as a workshop.

The courtyard of the house was paved with stone, and led to the kitchen and the other rooms. Three of these rooms were medium-sized and a fourth, a side room, extremely small. The very small mikvah is covered with gray plaster and has four steps descending to its bottom. In the corner of the kitchen was a stove, basalt grinding-stones next to it, and a large stone tray. Several stone jars were also found in the kitchen. The occupants probably used the heavy stone kitchenware, rather than pottery, because according to Halacha they do not contract ritual impurity. This suggests the occupants were a priestly family, who had to maintain their cleanness in order to work at the temple. This is also indicated by the presence of the mikvah.

==== Conflagration traces ====
Throughout the house are stones burnt by an intense fire, scorched wooden beams and layers of ash and soot that testify to the huge fire that raged here. Its walls and wood-beamed ceilings collapsed in a conflagration, sealing an abundance of diverse objects in its rooms. Scattered in disarray among the collapsed walls, ceilings and the second story, were fragments of stone tables and many ceramic, stone and metal vessels, iron nails found in the ruins are all that was left of the wooden roof, the shelves and furnishings which were completely burnt.

==== Small objects ====
Among the smaller artefacts found were inkwells, Roman-period oil lamps that were used to light up the house during the evenings, and other household items, the large jugs, bowls and measuring cups, indicating that this was a perfume production workshop. Leaning against a corner of a room was an iron spear, which may have belonged to one of the Jewish fighters who lived here.

==== Drainage channel ====
A covered drainage channel from the Roman period. According to the historian Josephus, some of the last Jewish rebels to hold out against the Romans hid in tunnels such as this.

==== Human remains ====
In the room identified as the kitchen, the forearm bones from the finger tip to the elbow joint of a woman approximately 25 years old were discovered. Since the bone is almost certainly that of a Jewish woman, it was buried in accordance with Jewish law, but pictures of the findings are on display.

== Kathros family ==
Also found in the house was a round stone weight, 10 cm (3.9 in) in diameter, inscribed in square Aramaic script with the words "Bar Kathros," meaning "son of Kathros." This suggests that the house belonged to the priestly Kathros family. The Talmud references them in a poem listing priestly families who abused their positions in the Temple, stating:

Abba Saul ben Batnit in the name of Abba Joseph ben Hanin said:

"Woe is me on account of the house of Baithos, woe is me on account of their rods

Woe is me through the house of Hanin and through their calumnies
Woe is me through the 'house of Kathros' and through their pens
Woe is me on account of the house of Ishmael ben Piakhi and of their fists,

for they were all high-priests, their sons were the treasurers, their sons-in-law were the chamberlains, and their servants would beat us with rods."

— Babylonian Talmud, Pesahim, 57:1

The attack for misusing their pens may mean they spread false rumors or misinformation. Although someone may have carried this weight from another house, the Bar Kathros family certainly had a house in Jerusalem, given their priestly position, and this one is a good candidate.

== Museum ==
The excavated house is open to the public, and its artifacts are on display in the small museum near the room. The 12-minute audio-visual presentation, set up inside the house, plays back the nearly 2,000-year-old events: the preparations of the revolt against the Romans, the different political opinions of the family members, news on the approaching Roman Legions, the destruction of the temple, the storming of both the city and the house, then ending with the torching of the house.

== See also ==
- Herodian Quarter – Wohl Archaeological Museum – a nearby museum, showing the remains of an affluent priestly neighborhood from the Second Temple period destroyed during the same siege
