= Shimon Green =

Rabbi Shimon Yerucham Green (Hebrew: שמעון ירוחם גרין) is rabbi of Kehillas Shomrei Emunim of Phoenix and the Rosh Yeshiva of Yeshivas HaTurim of Phoenix, Arizona. When Rabbi Green first came to Phoenix he was rabbi of Ohr HaTorah and the spiritual head of the Torah day School of Phoenix. Rabbi Green founded and was Rosh Yeshiva of Yeshivas Bircas HaTorah in Jerusalem a Yeshiva of Talmud professionals that specializes in intensive programs for adults. The Yeshiva utilizes a logical and rhetorical method developed by Rabbi Green that makes precision-Talmudic learning accessible to anyone who follows it diligently.

Rabbi Green emigrated to Israel at the age of seventeen. After fourteen years of intensive study with his primary teacher, Rabbi Mordechai Goldstein, he was ordained, and went on to pursue post-rabbinic studies with Rabbi Zalman Nechemia Goldberg, at the renowned Kollel Shevet U'Mechokek, from which he also holds an ordination. In addition to his formal studies throughout those years, he traveled the length and breadth of Israel presenting Torah outreach programs to thousands of youths and adults, in schools, army bases, kibbutzes and towns. In 1989, together with several colleagues, Rabbi Green founded Bircas HaTorah.

In addition to teaching at the Yeshiva, Rabbi Green gives numerous seminars, lectures, and weekend seminars throughout the world.
