= Al Dissi Mosque =

Mosque in Jerusalem

- مسجد الديسي
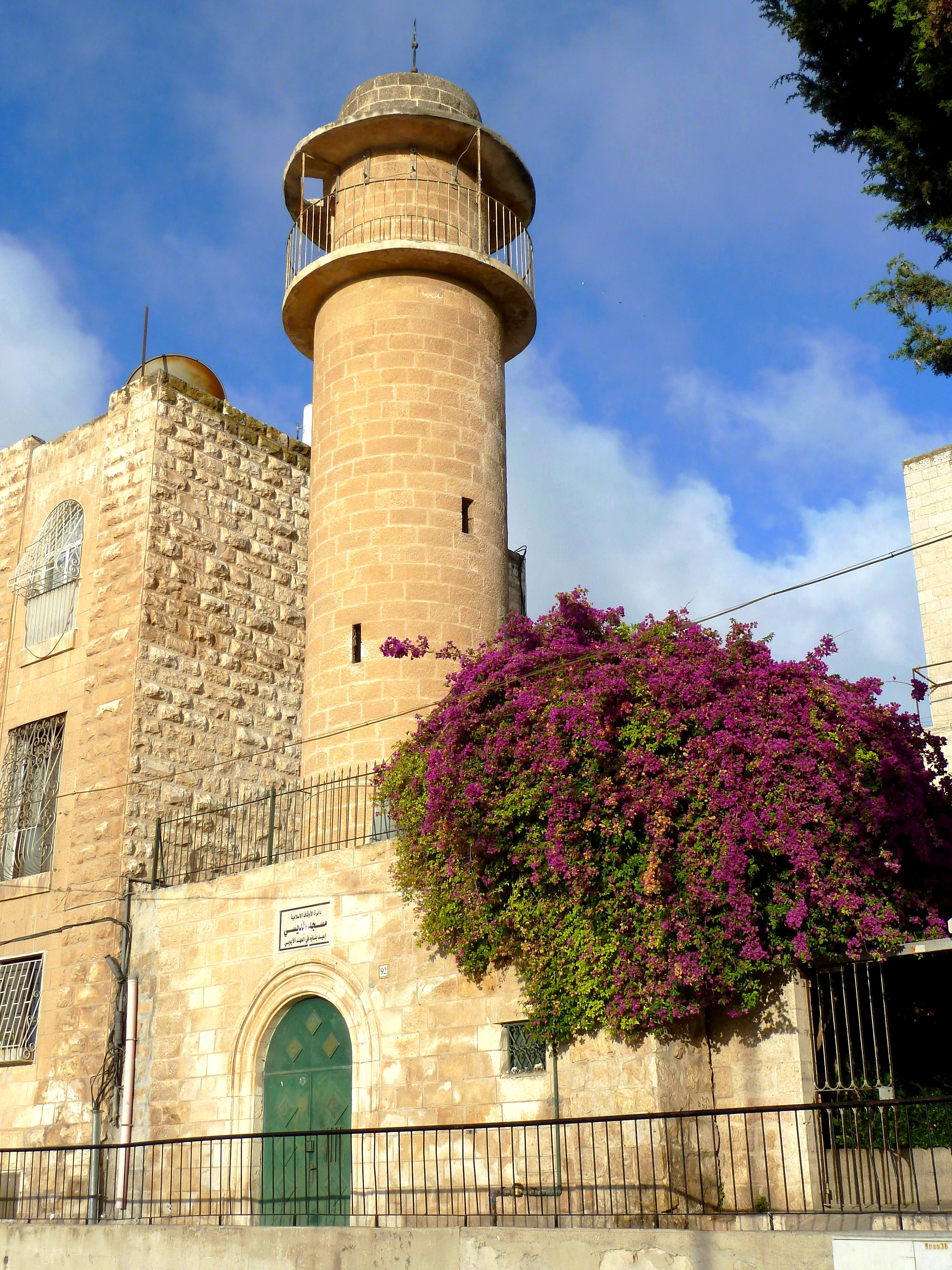
- The mosque in 2014

- Location of the mosque in the Old City of Jerusalem

Religion
- Affiliation: Islam
- Branch/tradition: Sunni
- Ecclesiastical or organisational status: Mosque
- Status: Active

Location
- Location: Old City of Jerusalem
- Interactive map of Al Dissi Mosque
- Coordinates: 31°46′25″N 35°13′50″E

Specifications
- Interior area: 60 m^{2} (650 sq ft)
- Minaret: One
- Minaret height: 15 m (49 ft)

The Al Dissi Mosque, also spelled as the Al Disi Mosque (Arabic: مسجد الديسي), is a medieval mosque located within the walls of the Old City of Jerusalem, on the edge between the Armenian Quarter and the Jewish Quarter.

== History ==
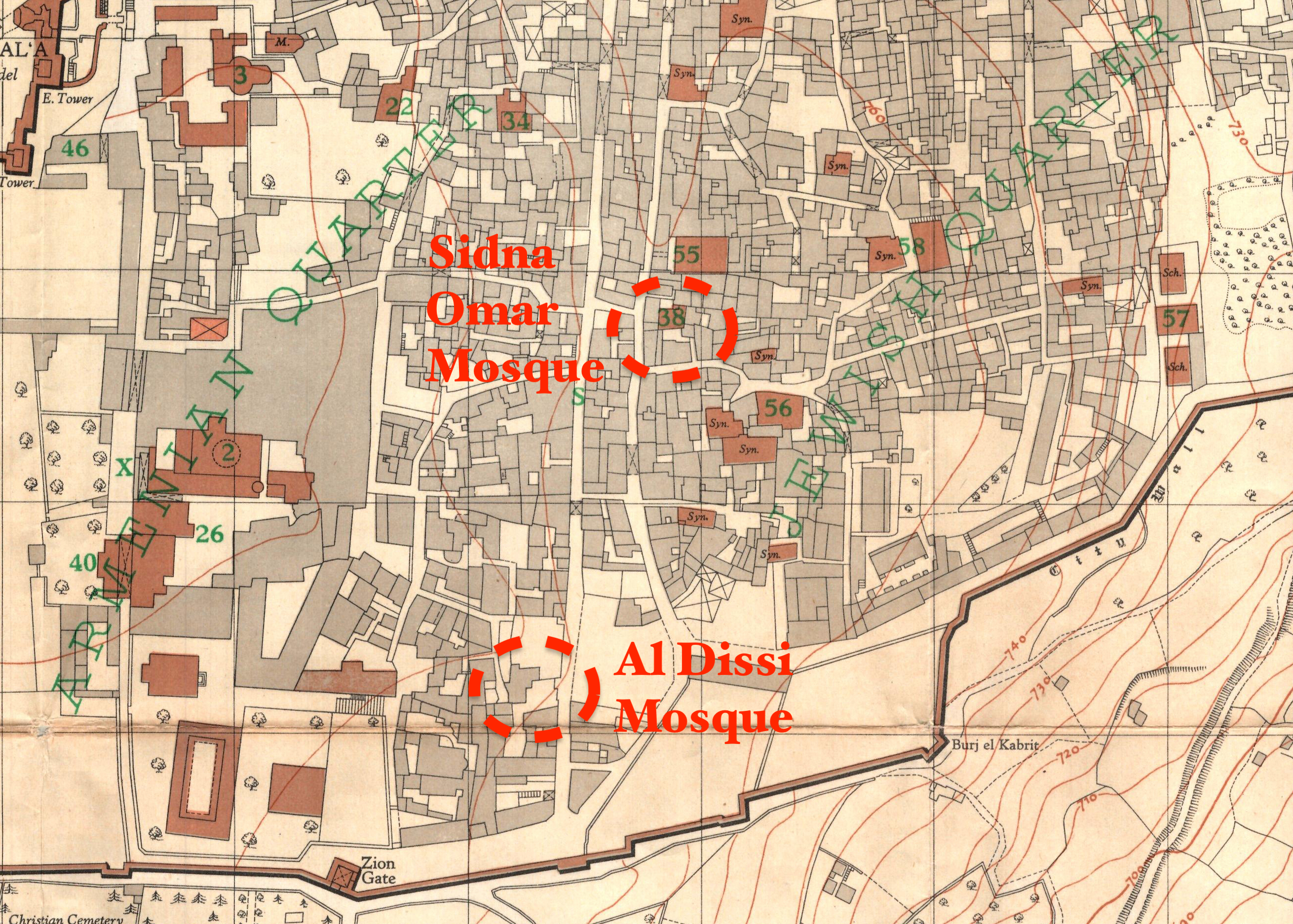
Location of the mosque, between the Armenian and Jewish quarters, in a 1936 Survey of Palestine map

The mosque dates from the Ayyubid era of Al-Mu'azzam Isa, and was later restored in the Mamluk era. In 1487 it was endowed by Al-Kameli ibn Abu-Sharif, and mention the mosque as "Masjid al-Omar". It was subsequently named the Al Dissi Mosque after a member of the Jerusalemite Al Dissi family.

1967–1976 demolition works carried out by the Company for the Reconstruction and Development of the Jewish Quarter adjacent to the site damaged the structure of the mosque; it was subsequently renovated by the Islamic Waqf.

In 2018 the King of Morocco, Mohammed VI, funded the renovation of the mosque. In 2011, Israeli newspaper Yedioth Ahronoth reported that the local Jewish community and the Waqf "came to an agreement" that there would be no muezzin calling from the minaret. Sheikh Mazen Ahram, a Jerusalem Imam, stated that the mosque's muezzin loudspeakers were confiscated by Israeli authorities in 1993, who subsequently prevented any announcements from the minaret. He also stated that the land in front of the mosque, owned by the Islamic Waqf, was confiscated by Israel and converted into a car park, and that due to its location near the Jewish Quarter, users of the mosque have faced racist insults and harassment.

== Description ==
The mosque has a minaret that is approximately 15 metres (49 ft) high, and has an area of 60 square metres (650 sq ft). The mosque prayer area is situated along a small corridor behind the low steel gate in the main entrance.

== See also ==
- List of mosques in Jerusalem
- Islam in Palestine
- Islam in Israel
