= Sidna Omar Mosque =

Mosque in Jerusalem

- مسجد سيدنا عمر
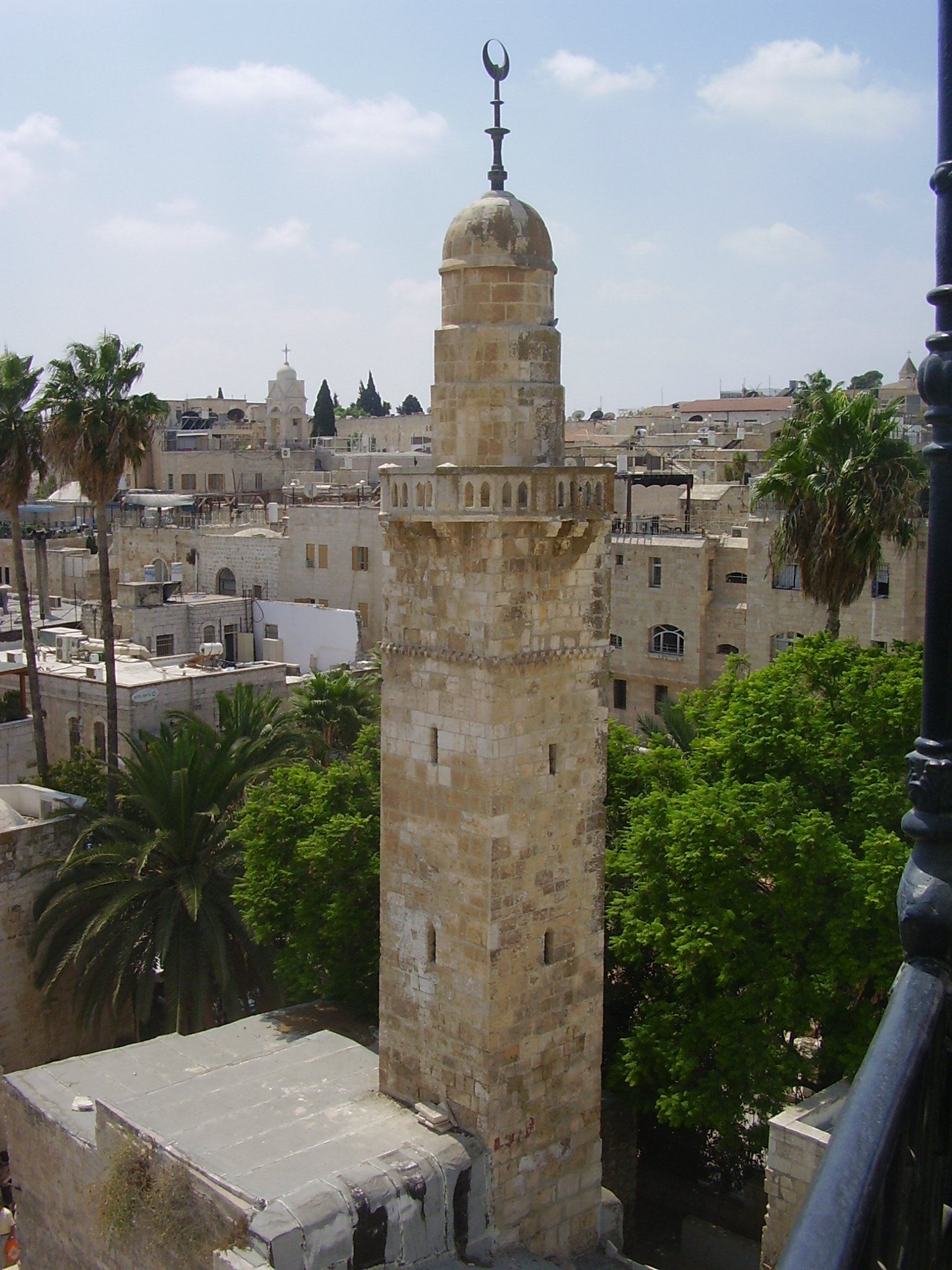

- Location of the mosque in the Old City of Jerusalem

Religion
- Affiliation: Islam (former)
- Rite: Sunni
- Ecclesiastical or organizational status: Mosque (14th century–1967)
- Governing body: Jerusalem Waqf
- Status: Closed

Location
- Location: Jewish Quarter, Old City, Jerusalem
- Interactive map of Sidna Omar Mosque
- Coordinates: 31°46′30″N 35°13′52″E

Architecture
- Style: Mamluk
- Established: c. late 14th century Mamluk period
- Minaret: 1

The Sidna Omar Mosque (Arabic: مسجد سيدنا عمر, lit. 'Lord Omar mosque') is a Mamluk-era mosque in the Jewish Quarter of the Old City of Jerusalem. It stands adjacent to the Hurva and Ramban Synagogues.

Ever since Israeli forces captured East Jerusalem, including the Old City of Jerusalem, in the Six-Day War of 1967, the mosque has been indefinitely closed.

== History ==
The earliest reference know to the mosque was made by historian Mujir al-Din (born in 1496), who mentions the mosque was renovated in 1397, with funds collected and land donated to maintain it. Obadiah Bartenura wrote that the mosque was built by a Jew who had converted to Islam.

In the Six-Day War, the minaret was hit by snipers and was renovated in 1974.

Further renovations to the building were done in 2019, paid for by the government of Jordan.

== Description ==
The minaret is typical of the Mamluk period. It rises two stories high and is topped by a balcony for the muezzin. The upper part of the minaret is narrower than its base in order to stabilize the structure.

== Archaeology ==
Some columns found inside the mosque have led to it being associated with the Crusader Church of St Martin in the late nineteenth century; according to architectural historian Michael Hamilton Burgoyne since the columns are in their secondary use "this tenuous link between the mosque and the church cannot be maintained."

== Gallery ==
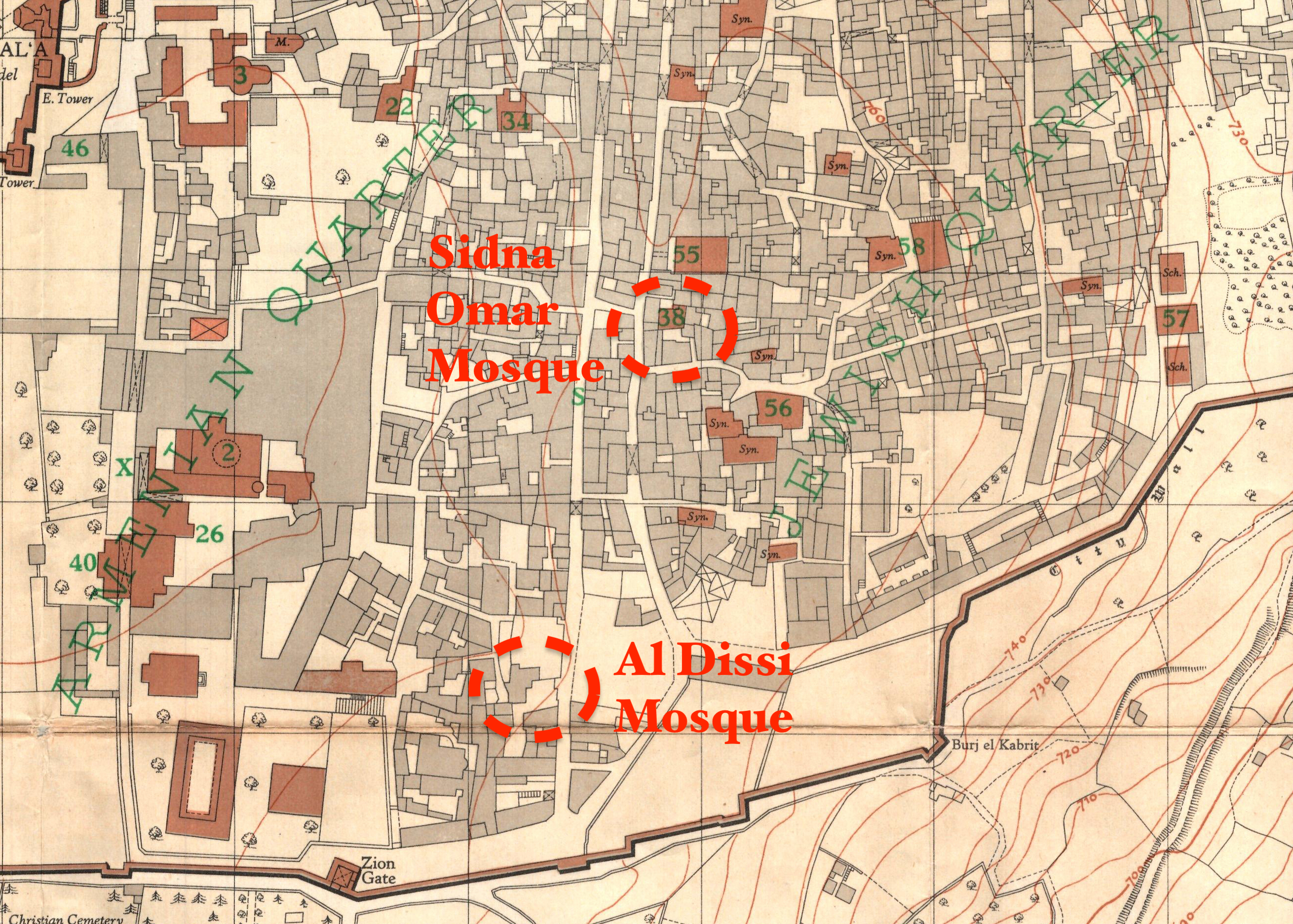
Location of the mosque, between the Armenian and Jewish quarters, in a 1936 Survey of Palestine map

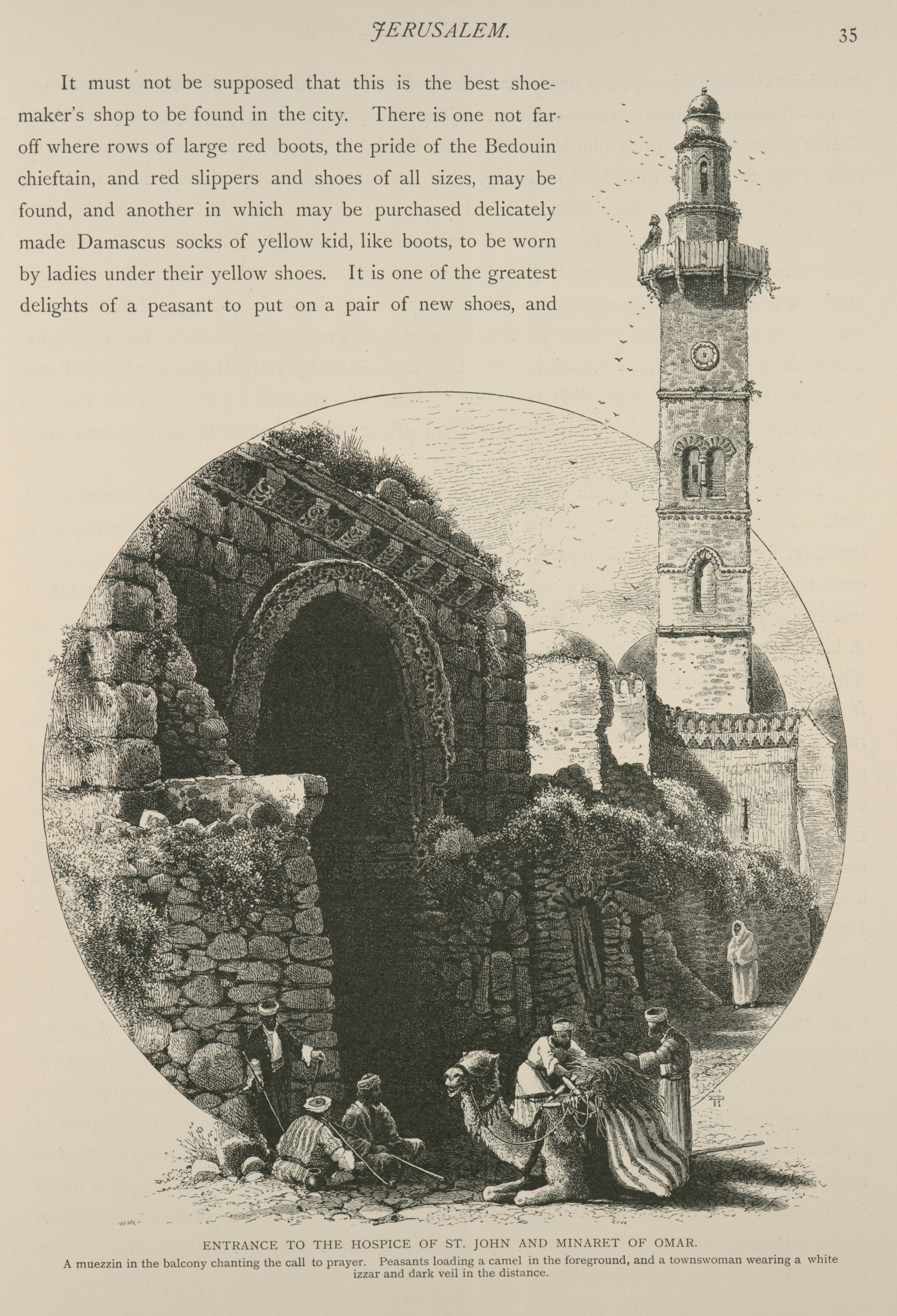
19th century depiction, described as the "Minaret of Omar", showing a muezzin in the balcony chanting the call to prayer

== See also ==
- List of mosques in Jerusalem
- Islam in Israel
- Islam in Palestine
