= Nahman Avigad =

Israeli archaeologist (1905–1992)

- נחמן אביגד
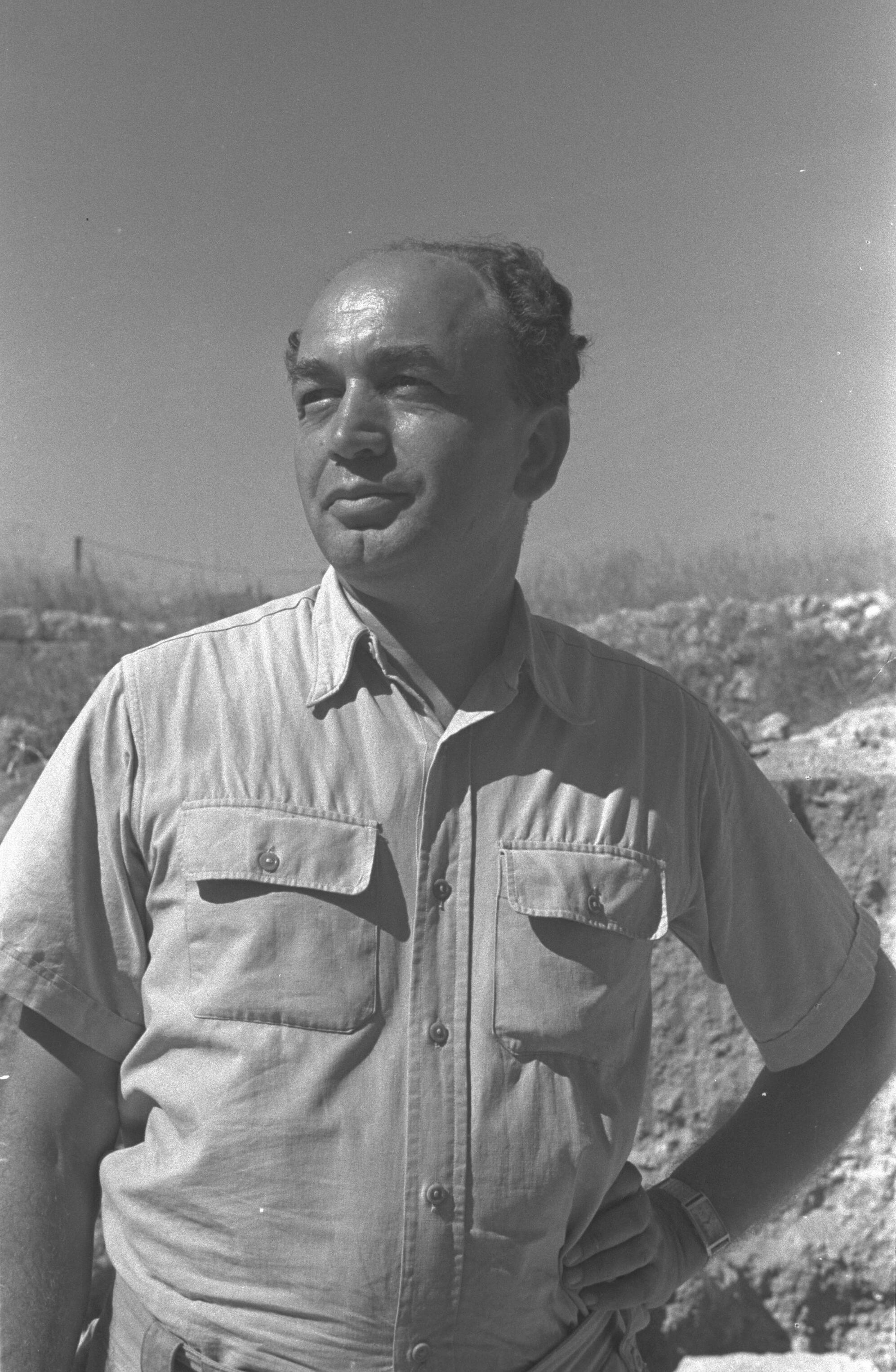
- Nahman Avigad, 1950
- Born: 25 September 1905; Zawalow, Galicia, Austria-Hungary
- Died: 28 January 1992 (aged 86)
- Awards: Bialik Prize (1954); Israel Prize (1977); Yakir Yerushalayim (1984)

Academic background
- Education: Hebrew University of Jerusalem

Academic work
- Discipline: Archaeology
- Sub-discipline: Hebrew seals; Jewish archaeology; Land of Israel studies
- Institutions: Hebrew University of Jerusalem
- Notable works: Discovering Jerusalem

Nahman Avigad (Hebrew: נחמן אביגד; September 25, 1905 – January 28, 1992), born in Zawalow, Galicia (then Austria-Hungary, now Zavaliv, Ukraine), was an Israeli archaeologist.

== Biography ==
Avigad studied architecture in what is now the town of Brno, Czech Republic. Avigad emigrated to Mandatory Palestine in 1926. He married Shulamit (née Levin) Avigad in 1928. He worked in the excavations of the Beth Alpha synagogue and the Hamat Gader synagogue.

Avigad earned his PhD in 1952, with a dissertation on the tombs of the Kidron Valley, Jerusalem. He taught at Hebrew University from 1949 until his retirement in 1974.

He directed the dig at Beit She'arim beginning in 1953. Avigad also worked on the excavations of Masada, the mountaintop complex built by Herod the Great. He was involved in the exploration of caves in the Judean desert, and published one of the Dead Sea Scrolls.

In 1969, Avigad was invited to undertake the excavation of the Jewish Quarter in the Old City of Jerusalem, devastated by the 1948 war and its aftermath. Among the finds were what was believed to be the earliest depiction of the menorah that once burned in the Second Temple, cut into a wall plastered 2,200 years ago, and the Burnt House, the remnant of a building destroyed when Titus, the future Roman Emperor, repressed the Jewish Revolt against Roman rule. This was the first physical or archaeological evidence for the destruction described in the work of Flavius Josephus. The dig also unearthed lavish villas belonging to the Herodian upper classes, remains of the Byzantine Nea (new) Church and Jerusalem's Cardo, a fifth-century 70-foot (21 m)-wide road connecting the Church of the Holy Sepulchre and Nea Church. Among the most exciting finds was the remnants of the Broad Wall twice mentioned in the Book of Nehemiah. Built to defend Jerusalem during the reign of King Hezekiah in the late 8th century BCE, there remains an 80-foot (24 m) stretch of wall, 23 feet (7.0 m) thick, rising from bedrock west of the Temple Mount. Nearby, Avigad also unearthed the Israelite Tower, a remnant of Jerusalem's Iron Age fortifications attesting to the Babylonian sack of Jerusalem in 586 BCE.

Avigad published on many topics, notably on Hebrew seals. One of the seals found by him in 1964 has been tentatively identified as belonging to Queen Jezebel, mentioned in the Bible: however, this identification is contested by others. According to Bible scholar Frank Moore Cross, Avigad "was Israel's most distinguished epigraphist in his generation, and one of the great figures in the history of Hebrew and Jewish epigraphy."

== Personal life ==
Nahman is the father of Israel Prize recipient Gad Avigad. Nahman and Gad are of the few father-son duos to have received the prestigious award.

== Awards ==
- In 1954, Avigad was awarded the Bialik Prize for Jewish thought.
- In 1977, he was awarded the Israel Prize, for Land of Israel studies.
- In 1984, he received the Yakir Yerushalayim (Worthy Citizen of Jerusalem) award from the city of Jerusalem.

== Bibliography ==
A complete bibliography and a biography can be found in the festschrift published in Avigad's honor: Eretz-Israel: Archaeological, Historical and Geographical Studies. Vol. 18, Nahman Avigad. Eds. B. Mazar and Y. Yadin. Jerusalem, The Israel Exploration Society and the Institute of Archaeology of the Hebrew University 1985.

Popular books

- Avigad, Nahman (1983). Discovering Jerusalem. Nashville: Thomas Nelson. ISBN 978-0-8407-5299-4.

== See also ==
- List of Israel Prize recipients
- List of Bialik Prize recipients
