= Victims of Acts of Terror Memorial =

Victims of Acts of Terror Memorial in Israel
- אנדרטת חללי פעולות האיבה
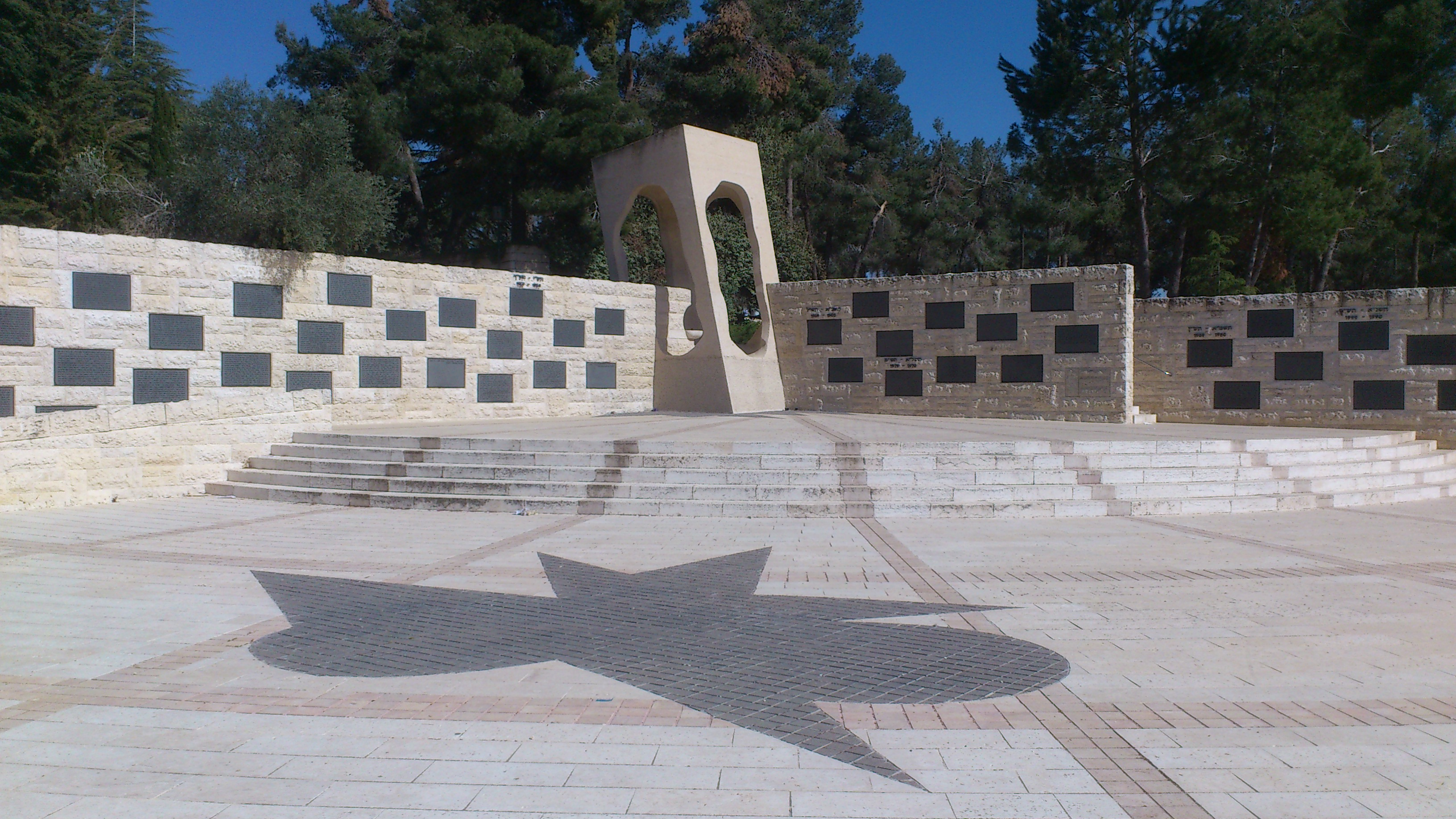
- Interactive map of Victims of Acts of Terror Memorial in Israel
- Location: Mount Herzl, Jerusalem
- Coordinates: 31°46′30″N 35°10′41″E
- Designer: Moshe and Rita Oren
- Material: Stone and marble
- Completion date: 1998
- Dedicated to: Civilian victims of terrorism in Israel, 1851–present

The Victims of Acts of Terror Memorial in Israel (Hebrew: אנדרטת חללי פעולות האיבה, Andartat Halalei Pe'ulot HaEiva, lit. "Monument to the Victims of Hostile Acts") is a monument to civilian Jewish and non-Jewish victims of terrorism in modern Israel and the pre-state Land of Israel, from 1851 to the present. The memorial was established in 1998 in the National Civil Cemetery of the State of Israel on Mount Herzl, Jerusalem. At the same time, Yom Hazikaron, Israel's Remembrance Day, was officially renamed the Remembrance Day for Fallen Soldiers and Victims of Terror.

== History ==
The memorial was the result of a grassroots effort to get the Israeli government to recognize civilian victims of terror as it does soldiers who fall in the line of duty. Until the establishment of the memorial, bereaved families erected their own memorial plaques and markers at the places where terrorist acts had occurred. After successfully pressuring the government to pay pensions to families of terrorist victims in the 1970s, the campaign lobbied for the inclusion of a memorial ceremony for civilian victims of terror during the official state Remembrance Day ceremonies at the Mount Herzl military cemetery. This idea was strongly opposed by the families of fallen soldiers, but a compromise was reached in 2000 to hold the memorial ceremony for victims of terror two hours before the ceremony for fallen soldiers. The two ceremonies continue to be held separately.

== Design ==
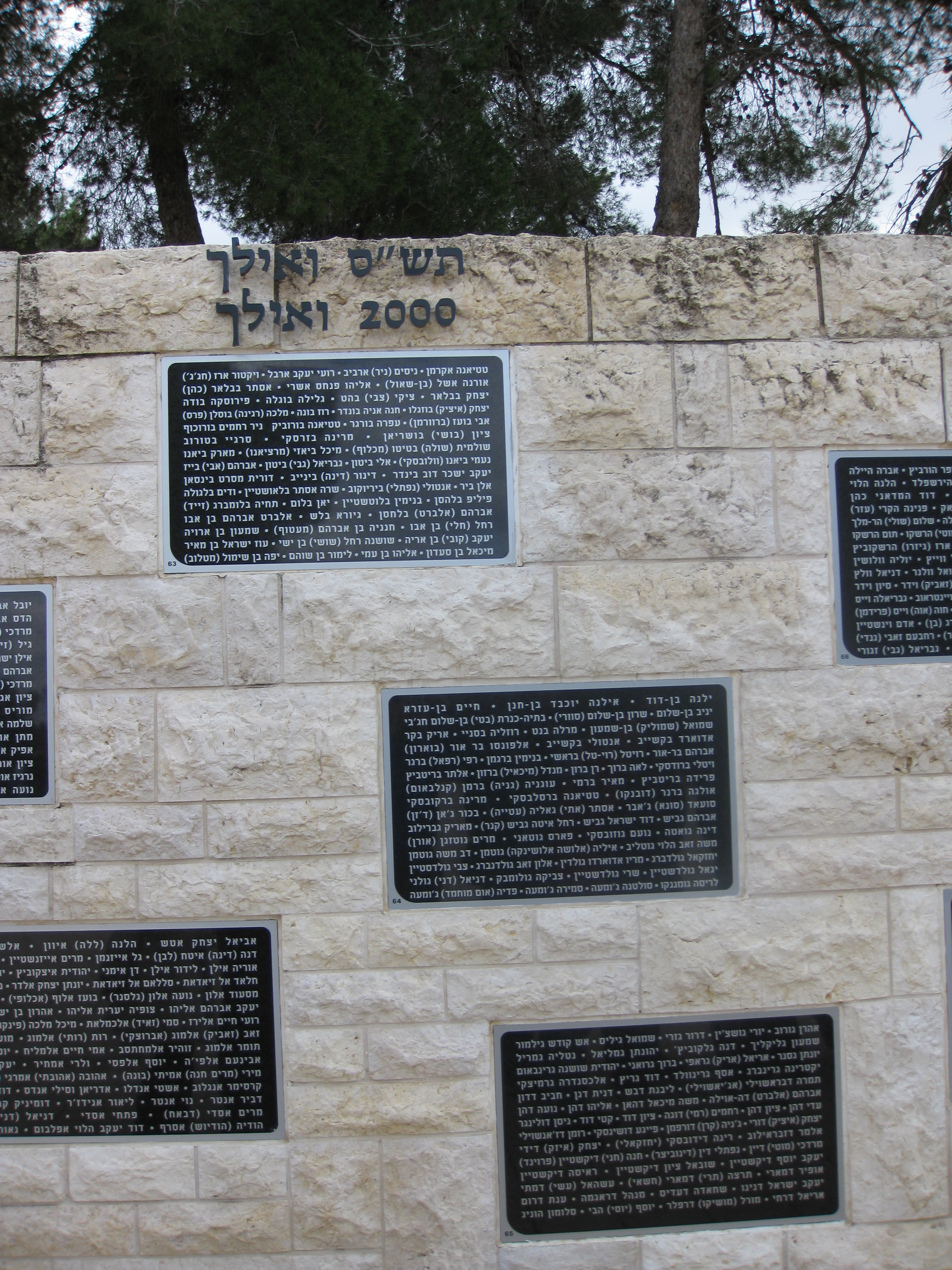
Close-up of plaques listing names of terrorist victims from 2000 onwards.

The Victims of Acts of Terror Memorial, arranged as a series of stone walls, was designed by architects Moshe and Rita Oren. It was constructed by the National Insurance Institute and the Ministry of Defense in cooperation with the Israeli Terror Victims' Association, the legal representative of terror victims and their families. The design is intended to depict "the stand of the Jewish People against those wishing to demolish its existence". The memorial is located midway between the military graves and the grave of slain Prime Minister of Israel Yitzhak Rabin.

A total of 78 black marble plaques embedded in the stone walls are engraved with the names of Jewish and non-Jewish victims of terrorist attacks in Israel. The plaques are grouped according to the following time periods: 1851–1919; 1920–1929; 1930–1939; 1940–1947; 1947–1949; 1950–1959; 1960–1969; 1970–1979; 1980–1989; 1990–1999; 2000–2009; October 2009 to the present. Plaques 1 through 60, which memorialize civilian victims of terror who died by the end of 1999, were permanently engraved on the eve of Yom Hazikaron 2006. The remainder of the plaques, memorializing civilian victims of terror who died from 2000 onwards, are temporary markers which will be permanently engraved following the approval of the victims' families.

== Controversy ==
According to Israel political scientist Meron Benvenisti, the memorial is more of an attempt to reshape collective memory than an accurate list of "victims of terror". The victim named as first, for example, was murdered by Arabs in 1851 after he petitioned the Ottoman rulers to remove them from their Old City home in advance of the construction of the Hurva Synagogue. Others were Jewish victims of the 1946 King David Hotel bombing perpetrated by the Irgun, a Jewish paramilitary group. The determination of inclusion as a victim of a “hostile act” is determined by the National Insurance Institute, Israel's social security agency.

== Stamp issue ==
The memorial was depicted on a 4.70 NIS Israeli stamp issued in February 2003.

== Pope Francis visit ==
On May 26, 2014, in between visits to Mount Herzl and Yad Vashem during his 3-day Middle East trip, Pope Francis agreed to Prime Minister Benjamin Netanyahu's suggestion to detour to the Victims of Acts of Terror Memorial, where the Pope touched the memorial wall and prayed. Netanyahu showed the Pope the memorial plaque to the 85 victims of the 1994 AMIA bombing in Buenos Aires, where the Pope was born.

== See also ==
- Terrorism in Israel
- Palestinian political violence
- Violence in the Israeli–Palestinian conflict
