= Avraham Wolfensohn =

18th- and 19th-century rabbi, Talmudist, and leader of the Jewish community in Safed

Avraham Wolfensohn (Hebrew: אברהם וולפנזון; 1783–1855) was a Jewish rabbi, Talmudic judge and leader of the Ashkenazi community in Safed, Ottoman Galilee in the mid-19th century.

== Biography ==
Avraham Wolfensohn was born in Shklov, about 300 kilometers southeast of Vilnius in Lithuania, where he became a disciple of the Vilna Gaon Eliyahu ben Shlomo Zalman. The Vilna Gaon's followers were called Perushim (Hebrew: פרושים) and came from the Lithuanian Mitnagdim community opposed to the Hasidic movement.

The Vilna Gaon believed that the return of Jews from the Diaspora to the Land of Israel would bring about the Messianic era. Influenced by the Vilna Gaon's vision, Avraham Wolfensohn founded an organization called Chazon Tzion ("Prophecy/Vision [of] Zion"), whose main principles included the ingathering of the Jewish exile.

In 1809, Avraham Wolfensohn traveled to and settled in the Holy Land as a member of the first of three groups of the Vilna Gaon's disciples. These migrations are considered to be the beginning of the modern return of Jews to their ancient homeland. Included in the groups were members of the Wolfensohn, Ze'ev, Rivlin, Zeitlin and Bassan families— many of the descendants of these disciples became leading figures in modern Israeli society. Their arrival encouraged an Ashkenazi revival in the land which until this time was mostly Sephardi.

Facing an Ottoman ban on Ashkenazi Jews settling in Jerusalem, most of the Perushim, including the Wolfensohn family, settled in Safed, forming the basis of the Ashkenazi community there. Rabbi Avraham Wolfensohn became the first judge of the Perushim in Safed and was instrumental in ending the friction between the Ashkenazi and Sephardi communities in the region.

== Family ==
His first marriage to Batya Bryna bore three sons and a daughter. His wife and two of his sons were killed in the great Galilee earthquake of 1837, while Avraham was away in Europe collecting funds for the Safed community. His son Ze'ev survived because he was in Jerusalem studying at a yeshiva when the earthquake struck.

Avraham Wolfensohn then moved to Jerusalem where he married his second wife, Sheindel, with whom he had four children.

As leaders and members of the Perushim community, Rabbi Wolfensohn and his descendants (Wolfensohn, Woolfson, Wolfson, Ze'ev) had a significant influence both on the history of the Yishuv haYashan and the subsequent State of Israel, including:

- Assisting in the rebuilding of the Hurva Synagogue, which had lain in ruin for 140 years.
- Settling the new neighborhoods of Nahalat Shiv'a and Mishkenot Sha'ananim, the first Jewish areas established outside the old walls of Jerusalem.
- Helping to found the Jerusalem neighborhood of Mea Shearim.
- Running the Moses Montefiore windmill in Jerusalem.
- Helping to found Bikur Holim Hospital, the first Jewish hospital in Jerusalem.
- Founding the first Jewish pharmacy in Palestine (Yehoshua Wolfinsohn, 1851–1924)
- Pioneering the printing industry in Palestine—including the production of the first Bible printed entirely by Jews in Palestine.
- Establishing the first institution for blind education in Palestine.
- Involvement in Civic Leadership (Mordechai "Max" Woolfson, 1900–1978—Town Clerk, Petah Tikva).

Most of Avraham Wolfensohn's writings were on religious subjects and were destroyed in the earthquake in 1837. Only one of his manuscripts was saved, and was published after his death. Written mainly in Aramaic, the book contains a short description of Avraham Wolfensohn's life. There are few copies in existence, but one is known to be in the Sde Boker library of David Ben-Gurion, the late prime minister of Israel.

Avraham Wolfensohn died in 1855 and is buried in the old cemetery in the Kidron Valley near Yad Avshalom.
