= Shlomo Zalman Zoref =

Rabbi (1785–1851)

Rabbi Avraham Shlomo Zalman Zoref (Hebrew: אברהם שלמה זלמן צורף) also known as Ibrahim Salomon (1786-1851), born in Kėdainiai, was one of the first pioneers who rebuilt the Ashkenazi Jewish community in Jerusalem in the beginning of the 19th century.

After making Aliyah and arriving in Ottoman Palestine, in 1824 the rabbi was sent to Constantinople by the head of the Perushim of Jerusalem, and succeeded in procuring a royal firman, commanding the kadi of Jerusalem to enforce the declaration of debt annualization concerning the Ashkenazi Jewish community of Jerusalem.

With the annexation of Jerusalem by Muhammad Ali of Egypt in 1831, a window of opportunity arose for the Perushim. On 23 June 1836, after traveling to Egypt, rabbi Zoref, together with the backing of the Austrian and Russian consuls in Alexandria, obtained the long-awaited firman for the reconstruction of the Hurva Synagogue.

Zoref became deeply engaged with Jewish lands seized by the creditors in Jerusalem and appeased the Arabs with annual bribes, but at some point the arrangement ceased and they tried to kill him. One night he was shot at by an unknown assailant who missed but later drowned after falling into a cistern. On a second occasion he was attacked on his way to prayers early one morning. In 1851, Zoref was struck on the head with a sword and died of his wounds three months later.

Zoref is named as the first victim on the Victims of Acts of Terror Memorial.

A street in Acre, where Zoref disembarked, is named after him.
