= Perushim =

Disciples of the Vilna Gaon

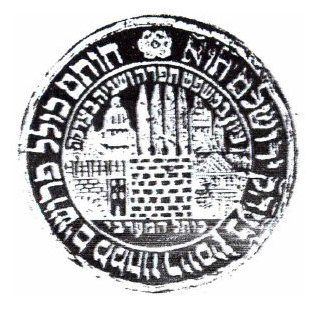
Seal of the community in Jerusalem (19th-century)

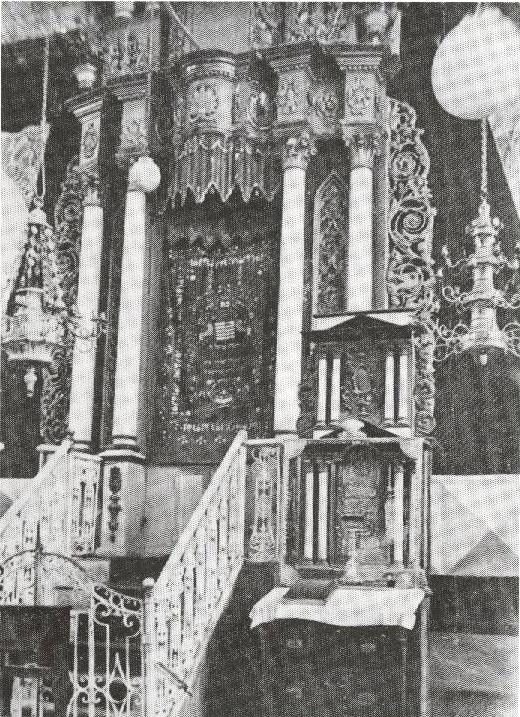
Hurva Synagogue of the Perushim in Jerusalem

The perushim (Hebrew: פרושים) were Jewish disciples of the Vilna Gaon, Elijah ben Solomon Zalman, who left Lithuania at the beginning of the 19th century to settle in the Land of Israel, which was then part of Ottoman Syria. They were from the section of the community known as misnagdim (opponents of Hasidic Judaism) in Lithuania. They were part of the Old Yishuv.

The name perushim comes from the verb פרש parash "to separate". The group sought to separate themselves from what they saw as the impurities of the society around them in Europe. Coincidentally this was the same name by which the Pharisees of antiquity were known. However the latter-day perushim did not make any claim to be successors of the Pharisees.

Influenced by the Vilna Gaon, who had wanted to go to the Land of Israel but was unable to do so, a large group of his perushim disciples and their families, numbering over 500, with a few dozen younger earlier scouts, were inspired to follow his vision. Enduring great hardships and danger, they traveled to and settled in the Holy Land, where they had a profound effect on the future history of the Old Yishuv. Most of the perushim settled in Safed, Tiberias, Jaffa and in Jerusalem, setting up what were known as the Kollel Perushim, and forming the basis of the Ashkenazi communities there.

== Journey to the Holy Land ==
The Vilna Gaon attempted to travel to the Holy Land twice, in 1772 and 1782. Difficulties forced him to abandon the plan each time. His disciples tried to realize what the Gaon had been denied. The perushim began their journey from the city of Shklov, about 300 kilometers southeast of Vilna in Lithuania. The organization they formed was called Chazon Tzion ("Prophecy/Vision [of] Zion"), and was based on three main principles:

1. Rebuild Jerusalem as the acknowledged Torah center of the world,
2. Aid and speed the ingathering of the Jewish exile, and
3. Expand the currently settled areas of the Land of Israel.

The perushim migrated in three groups. The first group left in 1808 led by Rabbi Menachem Mendel of Shklov, and the following two in 1809, led by Rabbi Sa'adya Ben Rabbi Noson Nota of Vilna, and Rabbi Yisroel ben Shmuel of Shklov.

They traveled via Constantinople on foot and by horse and wagon, and then sailed by boat to Acre. The trips lasted about fifteen months, and the travelers suffered many hardships, including starvation. The journey was made all the more dangerous because of the Napoleonic Wars that were raging across Europe.

=== Safed ===
Reaching the shores of Palestine was not the end of their journey. When the perushim first arrived, they faced a ban on Ashkenazi Jews settling in Jerusalem. The ban had been in effect from the early 18th century when, as a result of outstanding debts, the Ashkenazi synagogues of the Old City of Jerusalem had been forcibly closed and many Ashkenazim were forced out of the city and barred from returning.

While some managed to evade the ban by entering Jerusalem disguised as Sephardic Jews, most of the perushim journeyed on to Safed, where they joined a strong Sephardi community that was already there. Besides the Sephardim, the community included many Hasidic Jews, with whom the perushim had an ongoing feud. However, the two groups set aside their ideological differences and worked hand in hand to settle the land and develop their community and eventually intermarried.

Because flourishing agriculture was seen as a sign of Redemption, the immigrants had brought agricultural implements with them so that they could observe the commandments connected to working the soil in the Holy Land.

Safed in the first quarter of the 19th century was a bustling town of over five thousand Jewish inhabitants, but was still struggling to recover from the devastating Near East earthquakes of 1759. The physical and economic conditions under which its inhabitants lived were extremely harsh. The community was nearly destroyed by the 1812–1819 Ottoman plague epidemic, and was further diminished by the catastrophic Galilee earthquake of 1837, which killed thousands of people throughout the region. It leveled the city of Safed and seriously damaged Tiberias. Over 4000 people perished, including about 2000 Jews and 200 members of the perushim community in Safed.

=== Jerusalem ===
Believing that the catastrophe was a direct product of their neglect of Jerusalem, the surviving members of the perushim community in Safed decided that the only hope for their future in the Land of Israel would be to reestablish themselves in Jerusalem. However, entrance to the Jerusalem could only be gained once the decree against Ashkenazim had been annulled. The perushim could then reclaim ownership of the Hurva Synagogue and its surrounding courtyard and homes, sites that were historically Ashkenazi property.

The refugees succeeded in renewing the Ashkenazi presence in Jerusalem, after nearly a hundred years of banishment by the local Arabs. The arrival of the Perushim encouraged an Ashkenazi revival in Jerusalem, which until that time had been mostly Sephardi.

By 1857, the perushim community in Jerusalem had grown to 750 people. Rabbi Yisroel of Shklov, who had moved to Jerusalem in 1815, became one of the leaders of the new community. In the interests of strengthening the Yishuv ("settlement") and its economic base, Rabbi Yisroel corresponded with and met Moses Montefiore regarding the establishment and funding of agricultural settlements in the vicinity of Jerusalem. As a result, members of the perushim community were among the first to settle in the new neighborhoods of Nahalat Shiv'a and Mishkenot Sha'ananim, the first Jewish areas established outside the old walls of Jerusalem.

== Influence ==
The aliyah of the perushim had a widespread and ongoing effect on the Jews in Palestine. They spread the teachings of the Vilna Gaon, which had a considerable influence on Jewish thought and religious practice amongst the Ashkenazi community. They also set up several kollels, founded the first dozen or so neighborhoods in the New City of Jerusalem, including the neighborhood of Mea Shearim, and were instrumental in rebuilding the Hurva Synagogue, which had lain in neglected ruin for 140 years.

== See also ==
- Edah HaChareidis
- Haredi Judaism
- Neturei Karta
- Hastening Redemption
- Sha'arei Hesed
- Avraham Wolfensohn
- Shlomo Zalman Zoref
- Yoel Moshe Salomon
