= Dov Kalmanovich =

Israeli municipal politician and social activist

- דב קלמנוביץ'
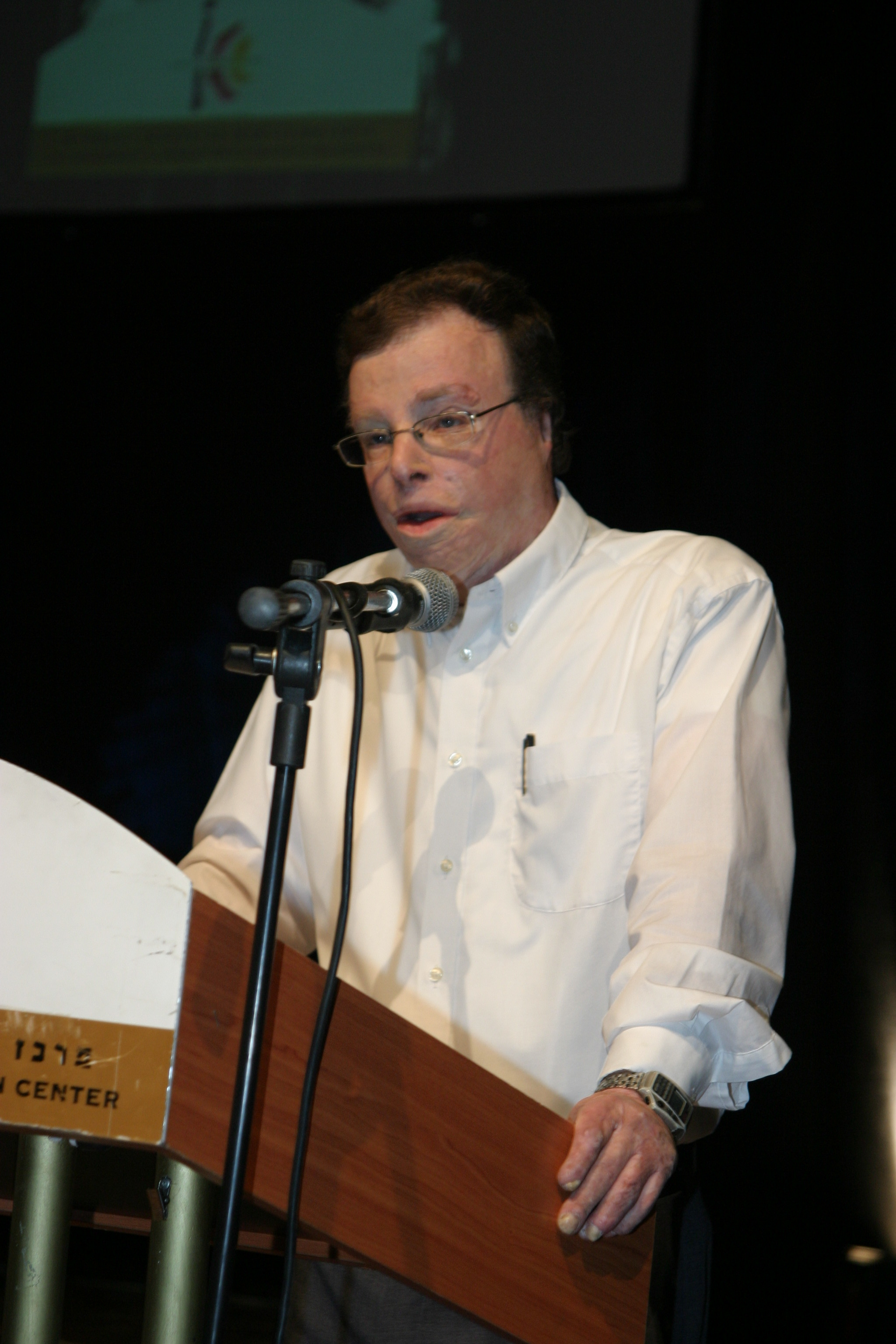

Deputy Mayor of Jerusalem
- In office 2013–2018

Jerusalem City Council member
- In office 2013–2018

Personal details
- Born: 1956 (age 69–70) Jerusalem
- Party: The Jewish Home
- Spouse: Adina
- Children: 6
- Education: Yeshivat Har Etzion; Bar Ilan University (BA)
- Profession: Accountant, activist

Dov Kalmanovich (Hebrew: 'דב קלמנוביץ; born 1956) is an Israeli activist and terrorism survivor, who founded the Organization of Victims of Hostilities. He served as chairman of the board of the governmental Company for the Reconstruction and Development of the Jewish Quarter of the Old City of Jerusalem and in other volunteer capacities. Kalmanovich served as a Deputy Mayor of Jerusalem and city council member from 2013-2018. He is considered the first Israeli victim in the First Intifada.

== Biography ==
Dov Kalmanovich was born and raised in Jerusalem to a family that goes back seven generations in the city. Kalmanovich studied at Yeshivat Har Etzion and earned a degree in accounting from Bar Ilan University. He is active in professional committees in the Israel Chamber of Accountants. After his marriage he lived in Beit El and later returned to Jerusalem. He was married to Adina until her death. The couple has six children.

Under his leadership, the Jewish Quarter Development Corporation rebuilt the Hurva Synagogue.

== Injury ==
On January 31, 1988, on his way home to Beit El, a Molotov cocktail was thrown at him by a terrorist. Kalmanovich suffered third degree burns on 75% of his body. Roni Ozeri, a resident of nearby Psagot settlement, saw his body on fire and stopped and rolled Kalmanovich in the sand, thus saving his life. He was taken to Hadassah Hospital in serious condition. Despite his critical condition and the doctors' initial assessments, he survived and went through a long rehabilitation process.

According to the Chicago Tribune, reporting shortly after the attack, "Kalmanovich is the first Israeli civilian to be seriously injured in the unrest since it began."

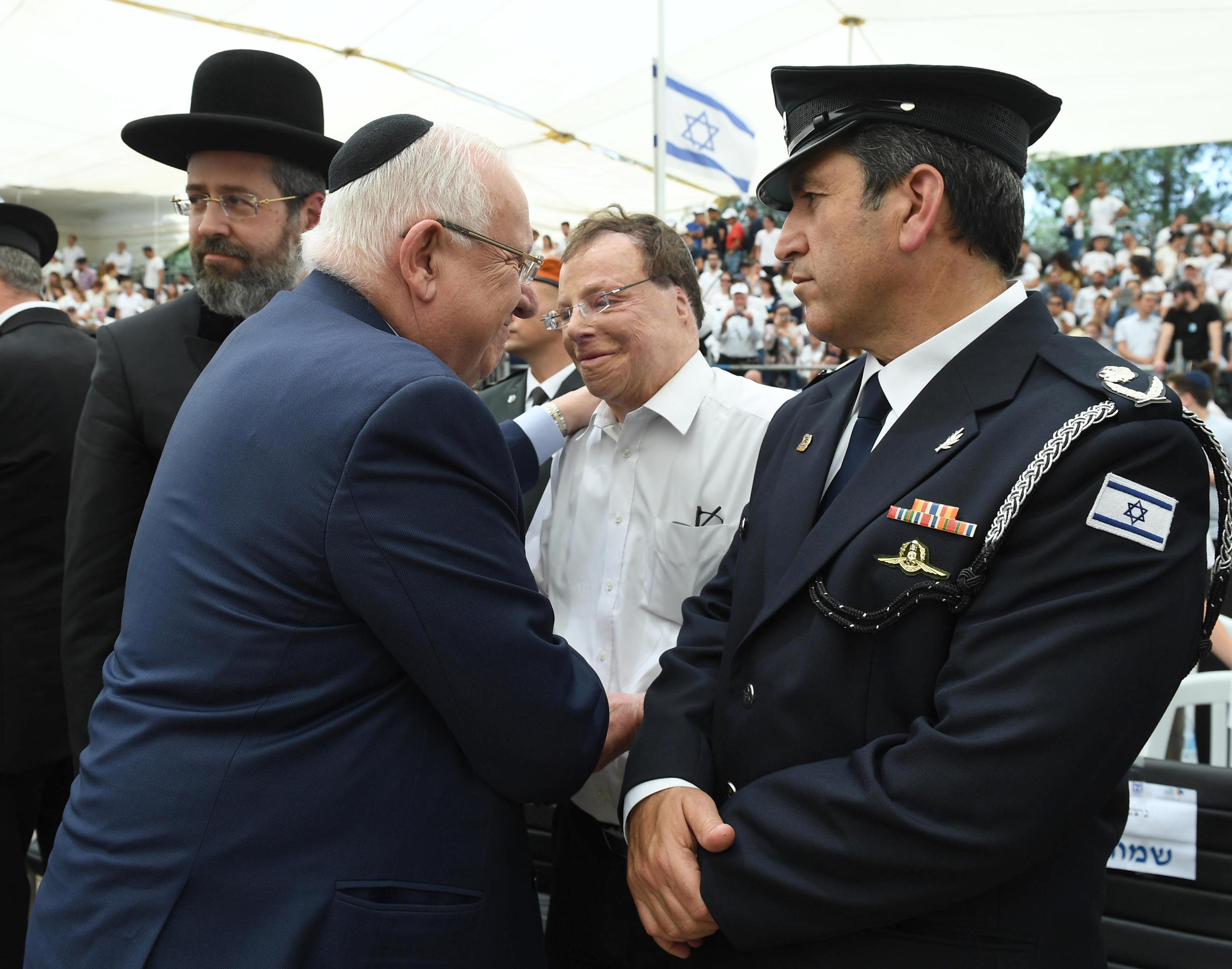
President Reuven Rivlin shakes the hand of Dov Kalmanovich at the state memorial ceremony for the victims of hostilities in Israel and abroad on Mount Herzl in Jerusalem.

The firebombing of Kalmanovich's car and the scarring injuries he sustained play a role in Naomi Ragen's 2007 novel about the First Intifada, The Covenant.

== Public activities ==
Following his injury, Kalmanovich continued his work as an accountant, and also began to engage in volunteer activities. Among other things, he served as the chairman of the Beit El Bet section of Beit El and a member of the Binyamin Regional Council.

=== Terrorist Victims Advocacy ===
He founded the Organization of Victims of Hostilities which advocates for terrorist victims and survivors. He initiated the establishment of the monument to terrorism victims at Mount Herzl cemetery in Jerusalem and worked to establish an official state memorial ceremony for victims on Memorial Day. He has appeared before the United Nations and the US Congress as a representative of terrorism survivors. He also participated in the Madrid conference and appeared in interviews and articles on the world's largest television networks. He founded the Zochrim organization for terrorism survivors and in 2009 was one of the initiators of the Zochrimpedia project, an online encyclopedia that memorializes fallen soldiers and terrorism victims.

=== Old City Rehabilitation ===
He later served as the chairman of the board of the Company for the Reconstruction and Development of the Jewish Quarter in the Old City of Jerusalem Ltd. There he devoted his time to the rebuilding of the Hurva synagogue which was founded in the early 18th century by followers of Judah HeHasid on the ruins of a 15th century synagogue. It was destroyed by the Ottomans, rebuild and later destroyed by the Jordanians in 1948. The reconstruction was completed in 2010.

=== Jerusalem City Council ===
In 2013 Kalamovich was elected to the Jerusalem City Council representing the Jewish Home Party for a five year term. He served as a deputy mayor and held the portfolio for religious education in Jerusalem, Jewish culture, tourism and foreign relations. He chose not to run for reelection when his term ended in 2018.
