= Hastening Redemption =

1985 book by Arie Morgenstern

Hastening Redemption: Messianism and the Resettlement of the Land of Israel
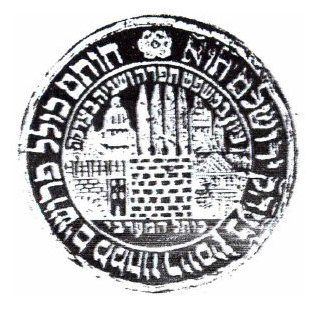
- Seal of Jewish community in Jerusalem in the 19th century
- Author: Arie Morgenstern
- Language: English
- Subject: Jewish immigration to Palestine
- Publication date: 1985
- Publication place: Israel

Hastening Redemption: Messianism and the Resettlement of the Land of Israel is a history of nineteenth century Jewish immigration to Palestine published in 1985 by Israeli historian Arie Morgenstern. Publication of the book led to a scholarly reconsideration of the followers of the Vilna Gaon, who were not previously thought of as messianic in outlook. According to Morgenstern, the messianic impulse that motivated Jews to settle in the Land of Israel and the belief in the centrality of Eretz Yisrael were critical components in Jewish spiritual life that predated the Zionist era. He bases his findings on documentation made available by the opening of archives in the former Soviet Union and archival discoveries in Western and Central Europe.

== Jewish immigration in 1808–1840 ==
According to a certain pietistic reading of the Bible and Talmud, it was said that the Messiah would arrive in the Hebrew year 5600, or 1840. Beginning in the early years of the nineteenth century, thousands of Jews able to finance the journey moved with their families to the Land of Israel to await the great event. The arrival of large numbers of followers of the Vilna Gaon, known collectively as the perushim, was especially notable. Sizeable groups are recorded as arriving from Jewish communities all over the world, including Persia, Yemen, Morocco, Algeria and Russia.

The Gaon's followers initially settled in Tiberias and then Safed. Later, some of them moved to Jerusalem and continued to live there, abandoning their messianic beliefs when the Messiah failed to appear in 1840.

The settlers' early enthusiasm was tempered by a devastating cholera epidemic in 1813. Much hardship was caused by the underdeveloped state of the economy and the Ottoman government's disinterest in securing the life and property of its subjects. The mortality rates among the immigrants were extraordinarily high. Life was difficult for everyone, but Jews suffered even more due to laws that forbade them to bear arms (making it impossible for Jewish travelers to defend themselves from bandits), build housing or establish synagogues. These restrictions could only be overcome by means of substantial bribes, and even that was only possible in the event that the responsible officials were corrupt and not especially ill-disposed towards Jews.

Some disciples of the Gaon arrived from Lithuania as part of the Hazon Zion (Vision of Zion) movement led by Rabbi Menahem Mendel of Shklov.

Conditions improved after the conquest of Syria (of which the Land of Israel was then part) by Muhammad Ali of Egypt in 1832. A letter from Jerusalem in 1834 describes large-scale immigration to the Holy Land: "It should be known to you that from other lands, worthy people are actually streaming to the Four Holy Cities (Hebron, Jerusalem, Tiberias and Safed)".

The new government was more lenient in its treatment of the Jews, allowing the rebuilding of synagogues in Tiberias and Safed destroyed by the Galilee earthquake of 1837 and the building of some Jewish housing.
