= Hurva Synagogue =

Orthodox synagogue in the Old City of Jerusalem

- Hebrew: בית הכנסת החורבה
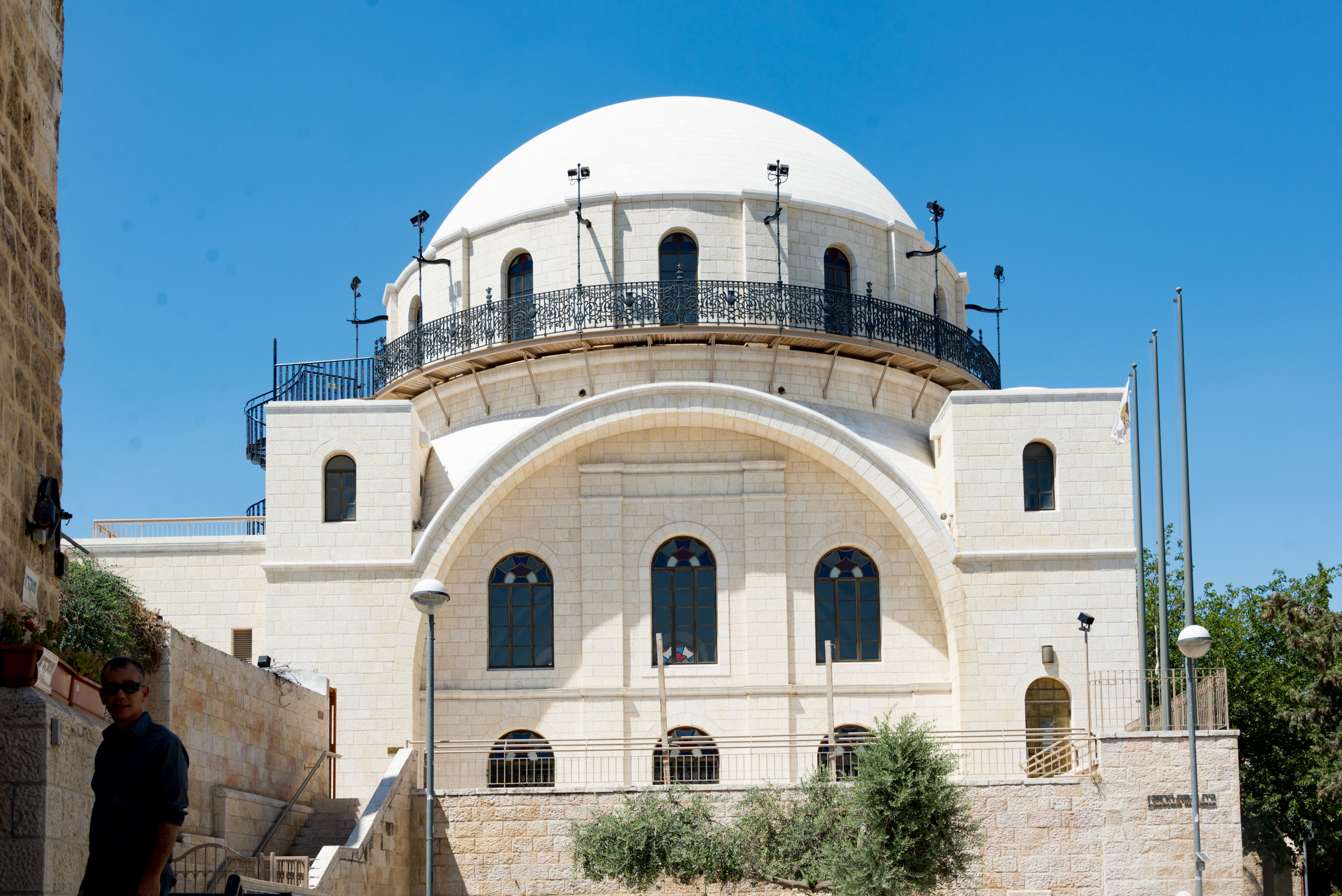
- The synagogue in 2014

- Location of the synagogue in the Old City of Jerusalem

Religion
- Affiliation: Orthodox Judaism
- Rite: Nusach Ashkenaz
- Ecclesiastical or organisational status: Synagogue
- Status: Active

Location
- Location: 89 ha-Yehudim Street, Jewish Quarter, Old City of Jerusalem
- Country: Israel/Palestine (Note: No nation named by UNESCO. See Positions on Jerusalem)
- Coordinates: 31°46′30″N 35°13′53″E

Architecture
- Architects: Assad Effendi (1864); Nahum Meltzer (2010); G. Igra (2010)
- Type: Synagogue architecture
- Style: Neo-Byzantine
- Established: c. 800–600 BCE (earliest congregation)
- Completed: 15th century; 1864 (rebuilt); 2010 (rebuilt)
- Construction cost: 1m piasters (1864); $7.3m (NIS 28m) (2009)

Specifications
- Capacity: 450 (1864); 250 (2009)
- Height (max): 24 m (79 ft)

The Hurva Synagogue (Hebrew: בית הכנסת החורבה, romanized: Beit ha-Knesset ha-Hurva, lit. 'The Ruin Synagogue'), also known as Hurvat Rabbi Yehudah he-Hasid (Hebrew: חורבת רבי יהודה החסיד, lit. 'Ruin of Rabbi Judah the Pious'), is an Orthodox Jewish congregation and synagogue, located in the Jewish Quarter of the Old City of Jerusalem.

It was originally founded in the early 18th century by followers of Judah HeHasid on the ruins of a 15th century synagogue and adjacent to the 14th century Sidna Omar mosque, but it was destroyed in 1721 by local lenders over a debt dispute. The plot became known as "The Ruin", or Hurva, where it lay desolate for 116 years until it was resettled in 1837 by members of the Ashkenazi Jewish community, known as the Perushim. In 1856, the Ottoman Sultan Abdelmecid issued a firman authorizing the construction of a synagogue at the site, and the sultan's chief architect, Assad Bey, designed it and oversaw its construction. Construction began in 1864, and although officially named the Beis Yaakov Synagogue (בית יעקב), it retained its name as the Hurva. It became Jerusalem's main Ashkenazi synagogue, until it was destroyed on May 27, during the fighting of the 1948 Arab–Israeli War. Israel claims Arabs deliberately destroyed it, while Jordanian and Palestinian sources state the Jordanian army was forced to shell the synagogue after the Zionist forces used its high rooftops for military purposes.

After Israel captured East Jerusalem from Jordan in 1967, a number of plans were submitted for the design of a new building. After years of deliberation and indecision, a commemorative arch was erected instead at the site in 1977, itself becoming a prominent landmark of the Jewish Quarter. The plan to rebuild the synagogue in its 19th-century style received approval by the Israeli Government in 2000, and the newly rebuilt synagogue was dedicated on March 15, 2010.

== History ==
=== Early history ===
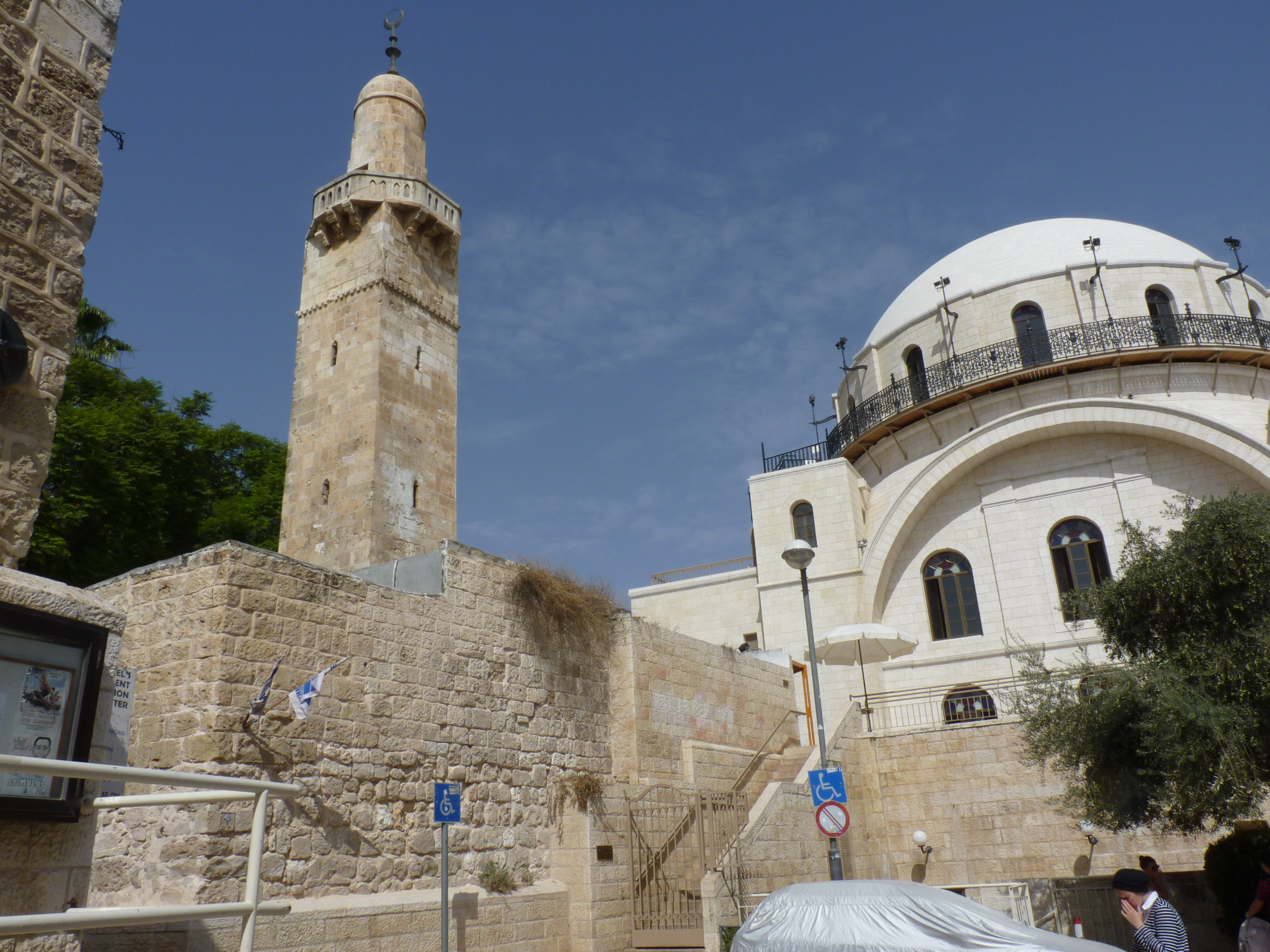
The Hurva, adjacent to the 14th century Sidna Omar Mosque in 2010

The Hurva Synagogue stands off a plaza in the centre of Jerusalem's Jewish Quarter, adjacent to the 14th century Sidna Omar Mosque. Excavations carried out at the site in July and August 2003 revealed evidence from four main settlement periods: First Temple (800–600 BCE), Second Temple (100 CE), Byzantine and Ottoman. Three bedrock-hewn mikvehs (ritual baths) were uncovered there dating from the 1st century. The earliest tradition regarding the site is of a synagogue existing there at the time of the second-century sage Judah HaNasi I.

=== Judah heHasid and aftermath: 1700s ===
In the winter of 1700, a group of around 500 Ashkenazim led by Judah HeHasid arrived from Poland to the region of Palestine. They were mystics who were intent on advancing the arrival of the Messianic Era by settling in Jerusalem and leading ascetic lives. A few days after their arrival in the city, heHasid died, and without a leader, their messianic hopes dissipated and the community began to disintegrate. Those who remained managed to build forty dwellings and a small synagogue in the Ashkenazic Compound. Soon after, they endeavoured to construct a larger synagogue, but the task proved expensive. They found themselves having to bribe the Ottoman authorities in order to enable them to proceed with their building project. Unexpected costs relating to the construction, financial hardships and the burden of various other taxes drained their funds. They became impoverished and were forced to take loans from local Arabs, eventually falling into severe debt. Pressure and threats from the creditors led to a meshulach (rabbinical emissary) being sent abroad to solicit funds for repayment of the loans. In late 1720, with the debts still outstanding, the Arab lenders lost patience and set the synagogue and its contents alight. The leaders of the community were imprisoned and shortly after, not only this group but all other Ashkenazim were banished from the city, an interdiction which remained until statute of limitations on the synagogue loans expired roughly a century later. Over the course of time, shops were built in the courtyard and the synagogue was left desolate, in a pile of rubble. It thus became known as the "Ruin of Rabbi Judah heHasid".

=== Efforts of the Perushim: 1812–1837 ===
Between 1808 and 1812 another group of ascetic Jews, known as Perushim, immigrated to Palestine from Lithuania. They were disciples of the Vilna Gaon and had settled in the city of Safed to the north. Some had wished to settle in Jerusalem and reclaim the Ashkenazic Compound. They were worried, however, that descendants of the Arab creditors still held the old promissory notes relating to the century-old debts incurred by he-Hasid's followers and that a new group of Ashkenazic immigrants would possibly inherit responsibility for repayment. The descendants of a group of Hasidim who made aliyah in 1777 also presented a problem. They apparently objected to any effort by the Perushim to take control of the synagogue ruin, claiming it had never belonged to the Perushim or their ancestors. The Hasidim claimed they had closer ties with the original owners and that their rights to the parcel of land were greater.

Nevertheless, in late 1815, leader of the Safed Perushim, Rabbi Menachem Mendel of Shklov, arrived in Jerusalem with a group of followers. They directed their main efforts to rebuilding he-Hasid's synagogue, which had symbolised the expulsion of the Ashkenazim from Jerusalem. By this, they intended to demonstrate the re-establishment of Ashkenazic presence in the city. Rebuilding one of Jerusalem's ruins would also have symbolic kabbalistic significance. The "repairing" of an earlier destruction would represent the first step of rebuilding the entire city, a prerequisite for the arrival of the Messiah.

In 1816 they "pleaded with the powers in the city of Constantinople to obtain a royal decree that the Arabs residing in Jerusalem would not be permitted to enforce the debts of the Ashkenazim", but nothing came of it. A year later, several leaders of the group, including Avraham Shlomo Zalman Zoref, a Lithuanian-born silversmith, and Soloman Pach, travelled to Constantinople endeavouring to obtain such a firman (imperial decree). Two years later, in 1819, their efforts were realised and the century-old debts were cancelled. The group acquired a legal document delineating the entire site acquired by he-Hasid in 1700. The area now included dilapidated dwellings and shops built by the creditors' heirs on part of the site. Next, they had to secure another firman that would permit construction at the site, including the building of a large synagogue. Two successive missions in 1820 and 1821 to obtain the firman from the sultan's court failed.

Still awaiting imperial permission to build in the courtyard, the Perushim wished to rely on an old firman given to the Jews in 1623, which stated that there could be no objection to them building in their own quarters. Having received a supporting document issued by the Qadi of Jerusalem in March 1824, it was possible for them begin rebuilding the dwellings in the courtyard. In practice, however, construction never materialised as they were unable to exercise their authority over the plot of land. This was apparently due to confrontation with the Arab squatters and the local government's disregard of the documents proving their ownership of the courtyard.

In 1825, following the disruption the group were experiencing, Shapira travelled to Europe once again. He hoped to secure the necessary firman, which would place the courtyard firmly in the Perushim's possession, and also to raise funds to cover the costs incurred trying to redeem the courtyard. His mission, however, was unsuccessful, as was a later mission attempted in 1829 by Zoref.

==== Egypt gives ambiguous consent ====
With the annexation of Jerusalem by Egypt in 1831, a new opportunity arose for the Perushim. They petitioned Muhammad Ali regarding the rebuilding of the synagogue, but concerns about deviating from longstanding Muslim tradition and the Pact of Umar (which restricted the repair or construction of non-Muslim houses of worship) meant permission was not forthcoming. However, five months after the earthquake of May 1834, the prohibition was relaxed and the Sephardim were allowed to carry out repair works to their existing synagogues. This consent gave rise to further efforts by the Ashkenazim to receive authorisation to rebuild theirs.

On June 23, 1836, after traveling to Egypt, Zoref, together with the backing of the Austrian and Russian consuls in Alexandria, obtained the long-awaited firman. It seems he was successful in gaining support of the Austrian consul and Muhammad Ali by invoking the name of Baron Salomon Mayer von Rothschild of Vienna. Muhammad Ali was hopeful that by giving his permission to rebuild the Ruin, Rothschild would be inclined to forge financial and political ties with him, which would in turn secure political support of Austria and France. In fact, Rothschild's involvement was a ruse. As soon as Zoref received the firman, he contacted Zvi Hirsch Lehren of the Clerks' Organisation in Amsterdam, requesting that funds his brother had pledged towards the building of synagogues in Palestine be applied to the Ruin. But Lehren had doubts as to what exactly the firman permitted. Explicit authorisation for construction of a large synagogue was absent. (A letter from the leaders of the Amsterdam community to Moses Montefiore in 1849 confirms that permission for a synagogue in the Ashkenasic Compound had not been sanctioned; they had only been allowed to build dwellings in the area.)

==== Menachem Zion Synagogue ====
In spite of the doubts highlighted in relation to the construction of a synagogue, the Perushim, confidently in possession of the ambiguous firman, began clearing away the rubble from the Ruin courtyard in September 1836. As the foundations of he-Hasid's original synagogue were revealed, they discovered a few old documents dating from 1579, signed by Israel ben Moses Najara. After much debate, they decided not to rebuild the Ruin, but initially erect a small structure on the edge of the Ashkenasic compound. The Arab creditors, however, still refused to relinquish the claims they had on the Jews and continued to interfere with the works. Zoref, claiming that the Ashkenazim currently in Jerusalem were not related in any way to those who had borrowed the money at the turn of the 18th century, was forced to appear in court requesting a further ruling cancelling the debts. He mentioned that an injunction had already been passed that absolved the Ashkenazim from repaying the debt and maintained that the Turkish Statute of Limitations cancelled out the debts of Judah heHasid's followers. Although the court ruled in the Ashkenazim's favour, Zoref nevertheless had to appease the Arab instigators with annual bribes in order to allow building to continue. At some point this arrangement ceased and in 1851, he was struck on the head with a sword and died of his wounds three months later. By January 1837 however, the Perushim had dedicated the modest Menachem Zion Synagogue in the northwestern corner of the courtyard. In 1854, a second smaller synagogue was built within the compound. The actual plot upon which he-Hasid's synagogue had stood 130 years earlier, however, remained in ruins.

=== Rebuilding he-Hasid's Ruin: 1857–1864 ===
In the early 1850s, the Perushim felt ready to attempt the building a larger synagogue on he-Hasid's original site. An outcome of the Crimean War was the British government's willingness to use its increased influence at Constantinople to intervene on behalf of its Jewish subjects who resided in Jerusalem. On July 13, 1854, James Finn of the British consulate in Jerusalem wrote to the British ambassador in Constantinople describing the wishes of the 2,000 strong Ashkenazic community to build a new synagogue. He noted that funds for construction had been collected by Moses Montefiore twelve years earlier. He also enclosed a 150-year-old firman, which authorised the Ashkenazic Jews to rebuild their ruined synagogue. As the title to the plot of land was held by the Amzalag family, who were British subjects, they designated London-born Rabbi Hirschell, son of Chief Rabbi of Great Britain Solomon Hirschell, to negotiate the transfer. The British consulate agreed to lend its sanction to the contract in order to avoid possible intrusion by the Turks. At issue was the question of whether the building of a synagogue at the site constituted the repair of an old house of non-Muslim worship or the establishment of a new synagogue. The Turks would have to grant a special license for the latter. This was received through the efforts of Francis Napier and Stratford Canning, 1st Viscount Stratford de Redcliffe, British ambassadors to the Sublime Porte, who secured the necessary firman in 1854. In July 1855, while in Constantinople, Montefiore was handed the firman, which he hand-delivered during his fourth visit to Jerusalem in 1857.

With permission granted, the groundbreaking ceremony took place on the last day of Hanukkah of 1855. On April 22, 1856, the cornerstone was laid in the presence of Chief Rabbi of Jerusalem, Shmuel Salant. Salant had been instrumental in raising the necessary funding, making a trip to Europe in 1860 and obtaining large donations, especially from Montefiore. Some of the stones used in construction of the building was purchased from the Industrial Plantation, where poor Jews assisted in quarrying and shaping the blocks. On May 7, 1856 Consul Finn inspected the site after receiving complaints from Muslims who suspected the opening of windows towards a mosque.

Although originally in possession of a lump sum they hoped would pay for the planned edifice, expenses increased. Construction work progressed slowly for lack of funds and the impoverished community soon found themselves having to arrange collections throughout the diaspora. One notable emissary, Jacob Saphir, set off for Egypt in 1857 and returned in 1863 having visited Yemen, Aden, India, Java, Australia, New Zealand and Ceylon. The largest single gift came from Ezekiel Reuben, a wealthy Sephardi Jew from Baghdad, who gave 100,000 of the million piasters needed. His sons, Menashe and Sasson, later supplemented his donation. The combined donations from the Reuben family eventually covered more than half the cost. It marked an important step in the unity of the Sephardic and Ashkenazic communities of the city. Another contributor was Frederick William IV of Prussia, whose name was inscribed above the entrance together with those of other benefactors. He also gave permission for funds to be collected from his Jewish subjects. Throughout Western Europe, emissaries sought donations with the slogan "Merit Eternal Life with one stone".

With new funds arriving, work could progress. In 1862 the domed ceiling was completed and Rabbi Yeshaya Bardaki, head of the Ashkenazic community, was honored with placing the final stone of the dome. Two years later in 1864, the new synagogue was dedicated. Present was Baron Alphonse James de Rothschild, who 8 years earlier had been given the honour of laying the first stone. The edifice was officially named Beis Yaakov – "House of Jacob" – in memory of James Mayer de Rothschild, whose son Edmond James de Rothschild had dedicated much of his life supporting the Jews of Palestine. The locals, however, continued to refer to the building as the Hurva. As a token of gratitude to the British government for their involvement, the British Consul James Finn, was invited to the dedication ceremony, which included a thanksgiving service. He described the "beautiful chants and anthems in Hebrew", the subsequent refreshments provided and the playing of Russian and Austrian music.

==== Structure ====
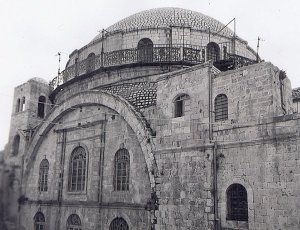
Northern facade, c. 1930

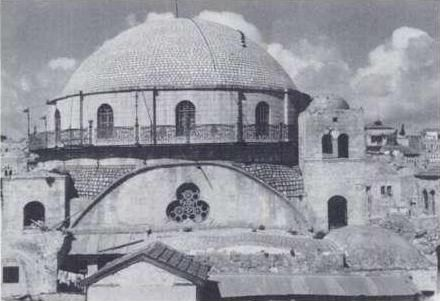
Eastern facade, c. 1930

The Hurva Synagogue was designed and constructed under the supervision of Assad Effendi, the sultan's official architect. Built in Byzantine Revival style, it was supported by four massive pilasters at each corner over which soared a large dome. The construction of only one of these towers was completed. The other three were missing the upper level and the small dome that capped it. The facade was covered in finely hewn stone and incorporated 12.5 m (41 ft) high window arches. The height of the synagogue to the bottom of its dome was around 16 m (52 ft) and to the top of the dome it was 24 m (79 ft). Twelve windows were placed around the base of the dome, which was surrounded by a veranda, which offered a fine view of large parts of the Old City and the area around Jerusalem. Being one of the tallest structures in the Old City, it was visible for miles.

==== Interior ====
The synagogue prayer hall was reached via an entrance with three iron gates. The length was around 15.5 m (51 ft) and the width was around 14 m (46 ft). The women's section was in the galleries, along the three sides of the chapel, except the eastern side. Access to the galleries was through towers situated at the corners of the building.

The Torah ark had the capacity to house 50 Torah scrolls and was built on two levels. It was flanked by four Corinthian columns surrounded by baroque woodcuts depicting flowers and birds. The Ark, together with its ornamental gates, were taken from the Nikolayevsky Synagogue in Kherson, Russia, which had been used by Russian Jewish conscripts forced to spend twenty-five years in the Imperial Russian Army. Directly above the Ark was a triangular window with rounded points. To the right and in front of the ark was the cantor's podium, which was designed as a miniature version of the two-level Ark.

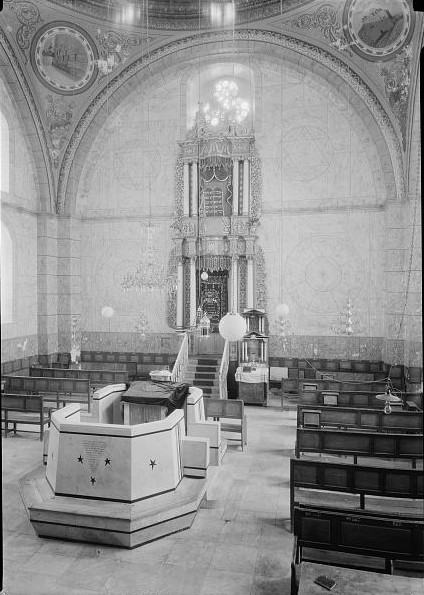
Former interior, c. 1935

The centre of the synagogue originally contained a high wooden bimah, but this was later replaced with a flat platform covered with expensive marble plates.

Numerous crystal chandeliers hung from the dome. The dome itself was painted sky-blue and strewn with golden stars. Frescoes with religious motifs, such as stars of David, the menorah, Mount Sinai and the Ten Commandments, adorned every wall. In the four corners were drawings of four animals in accordance with the statement in Pirkei Avot: "Be strong as the leopard and swift as the eagle, fleet as the deer and brave as the lion to do the will of your Father in Heaven."

One of the most generous donations came from Pinchas Rosenberg, the Imperial Court tailor of Saint Petersburg. In the diary of Rabbi Chaim ha-Levy, the emissary who had been sent from Jerusalem to collect funds for the synagogue, Rosenberg set out in details what his money was intended for. Among the items that were bought with his money were two big bronze candelabras; a silver menorah that "arrived miraculously on the 1st Tevet [1866] precisely in time to light the last eight Hanukah candles" and an iron door made under the holy ark for safe-keeping of the candlestick. He also earmarked funds towards the building of an "artistically wrought iron fence around the roof under the upper windows so that there be a veranda on which may stand all our brethren who go up in pilgrimage to behold our desolate Temple, and also a partition for the womenfolk on the Feast of Tabernacles and Simchat Torah".

=== Golden years: 1864–1948 ===
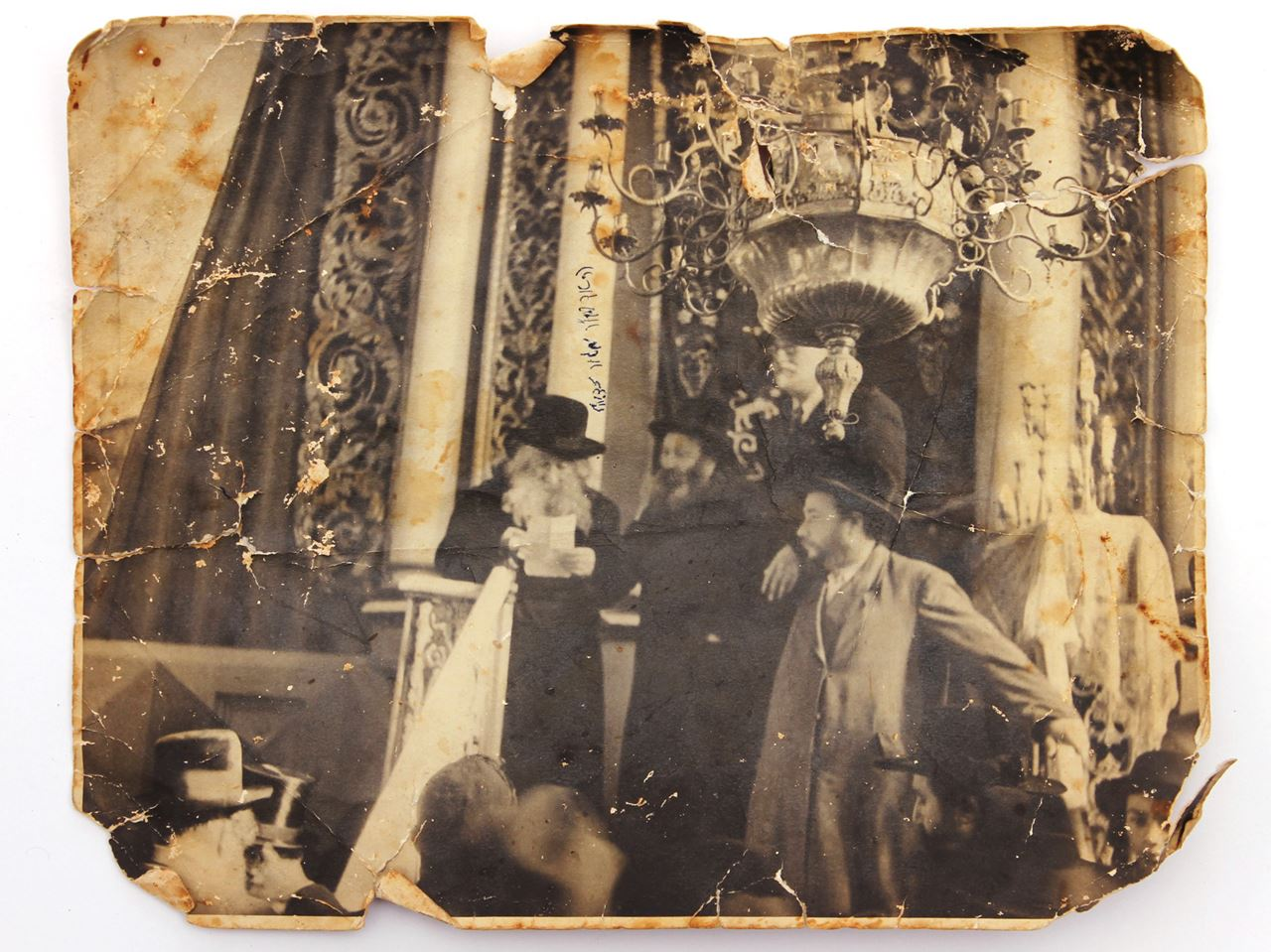
The Gerer Rebbe at a prayer gathering at the synagogue, 1942

From 1864 onwards, the Hurva Synagogue was considered the most beautiful and most important synagogue in the Land of Israel. It was described as "the glory of the Old City" and the "most striking edifice in all of Palestine". It also housed part of the Etz Chaim Yeshiva, the largest yeshiva in Jerusalem. It was a focal point of Jewish spiritual life in the city and was the site of the installation of the Ashkenazic chief rabbis of both Palestine and Jerusalem. On his visit to Jerusalem in 1866, Moses Montefiore went to the synagogue, placing a silver breastplate on one of the Torah scrolls. When he visited again in 1875, a crowd of 3,000 Jews turned out to greet him. On February 3, 1901 a memorial service for Queen Victoria took place inside the synagogue in gratitude for the protection afforded to the Jews of Jerusalem by Britain. The service was presided over by the Ashkenazic Chief Rabbi, Shmuel Salant. According to a report in The Jewish Chronicle, the large building was "filled to its utmost capacity and policemen had to keep off the crowds, who vainly sought admission, by force". In around 1919, Benjamin Lee Gordon wrote that the "synagogue presented a very pleasant and dignified appearance. It was well illuminated with artistic lamps presented by a certain Mr. Lichtenstein, of Philadelphia". In 1921 Abraham Isaac Kook was appointed first Chief Rabbi of Palestine at the synagogue. The synagogue also hosted Herbert Samuel, 1st Viscount Samuel, who was honoured with reciting a portion of the Torah. In 1923 Yosef Shalom Eliashiv's bar mitzvah was held at the synagogue. In the 1930s and possibly earlier, the synagogue housed the Chayei Olam Cheider, where indigent students form the Old City received their Torah education.

=== Destruction during the 1948 Arab–Israeli War ===
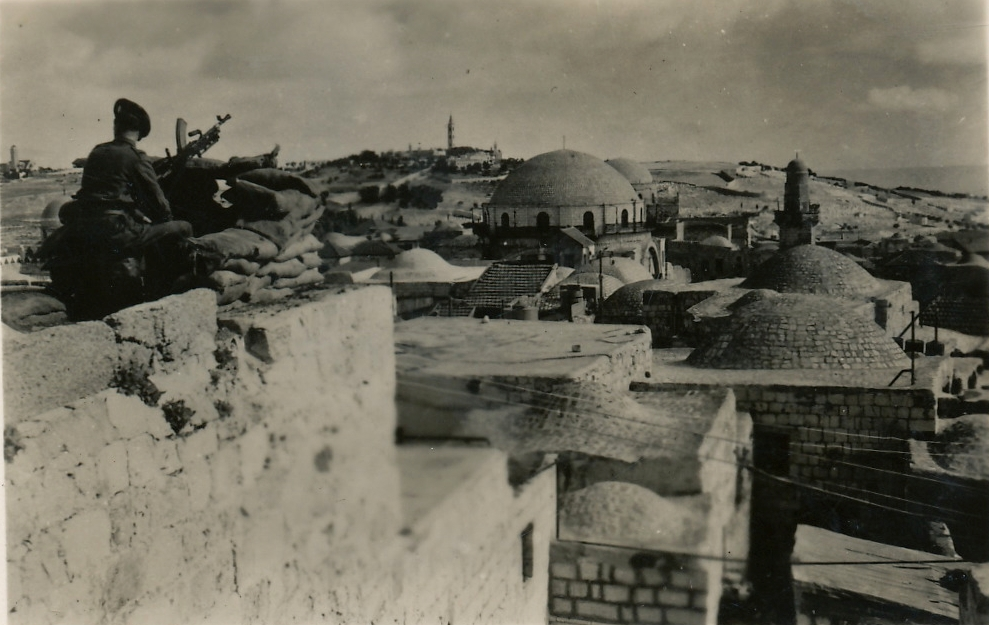
Hurva 1948

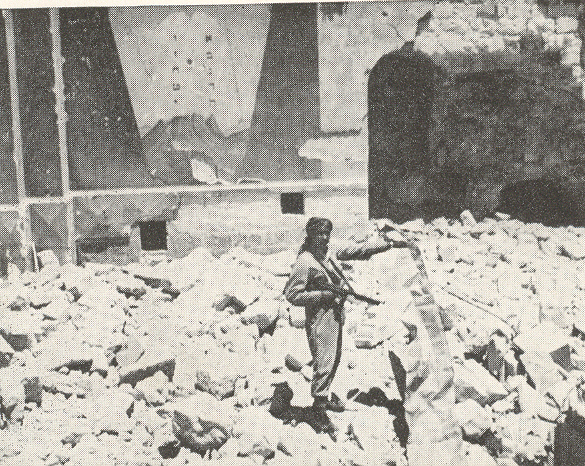
Arab Legion soldier within the ruins, after the Legion blew it up. Behind him, remnants of the eastern wall show a painted fresco of Mount Sinai and two arched tablets symbolising the Ten Commandments. June 1948.

On May 25, 1948, during the battle for the Jerusalem Old City, commander of the Jordanian Arab Legion, Major Abdullah el-Tell, wrote to Otto Lehner of the International Red Cross and Red Crescent Movement to warn that unless the armed Zionist forces (including the Haganah) withdrew from the synagogue and its adjoining courtyard, the Arab Legion would be forced to attack it. Moshe Russnak, commander of the Haganah in the Old City, ignored his request, knowing that if the Hurva fell, the battle for the Jewish Quarter would soon be lost. On May 26, 1948, the Jordanian Arab Legion delivered an ultimatum to the Jews to surrender within 12 hours; otherwise the Hurva would be bombarded.

On May 27, el-Tell, after receiving no answer to his proposition, told his men to "Get the Hurva Synagogue by noon." Fawzi el-Kutub executed the mission by placing a 200-litre barrel filled with explosives against the synagogue wall. The explosion resulted in a gaping hole and Haganah fighters spent forty-five minutes fighting in vain to prevent the Legionnaires from entering. When they finally burst through, they tried to reach the top of its dome to plant an Arab flag. Three were shot by snipers, but the fourth succeeded. The Arab flag flying over the Old City skyline signaled the Legion's triumph. Photographs show that the dome of the synagogue was badly damaged during the fighting.

After taking the synagogue, Israeli sources state the Arab Legion blew up what remained: a huge explosion reduced the 84-year-old synagogue, together with the Etz Chaim Yeshiva attached to it, to rubble. Meanwhile Arab sources state the synagogue was destroyed as its rooftops were used militarily by Jewish armed groups. The Jewish defenders of the Old City surrendered the following day.

=== Post-1967: Plans sought for a new design ===
The synagogue in ruins, 1967

Following the Six-Day War, plans were mooted and designs sought for a new synagogue to be built at the site, part of the overall rehabilitation of the Jewish Quarter. Many religious and political figures supported the proposal to rebuild the original synagogue "where it was, as it was" in line with the traditional religious character of the area. However, the Jewish Quarter Development Company, in charge of the restoration of the Jewish Quarter, strongly opposed it. The Israeli planners and architects involved in developing the area wanted the building to reflect their modern Western identity. Additionally, although it would have been possible to rebuild it as it was, neither the architects nor the masons felt they were sufficiently qualified in traditional masonry technology to attempt it. Moreover, most of the original carved stones and surviving decorative elements had been removed, making a true "reconstruction" unrealisable. Swayed by the creativity of contemporary architecture and contrary to the 19th century design, which was meant to blend in with the Oriental landscape, they supported the modern redesign of the Hurva by a prominent architect.

==== Kahn plans ====
Leading the campaign to rebuild the Hurva was Shlomo Zalman Tzoref's great-great-grandson, Ya'acov Salomon. He consulted Ram Karmi, who in turn recommended Louis Kahn, a world-renowned architect who was also a founding member of the Jerusalem Committee. Kahn had also previously designed Philadelphia's Mikveh Israel Synagogue in 1961 which remained unbuilt. Between 1968 and 1973, Kahn presented three plans for the reconstruction. The ruins were incorporated in a memorial garden, with a new structure on an adjacent lot and a promenade, the "Route of the Prophets", leading to the Western Wall.

Kahn proposed a structure within a structure, monumental "pylons of Jerusalem stone on each side enclosing four huge central pillars of reinforced concrete, so that the pylons function[ed] as a container and the pillars as its content". Following the Beaux-Arts tradition, the elements of architecture were conceived as hollow, thus creating pocketing spaces within both structures. (Note: According to Steven K. Peterson, the phenomenon of pocketing spaces within masonry or structure is known as architectural poche (Ideas en Arte y Tecnología 2/3, Buenos Aires, 1984).) The outer structure was composed of 16 piers covered in golden Jerusalem stone cut in blocks of the same proportions and same course finish as those of the Western Wall. In the bases of the four corners of the two-story, 12 m (39 ft) high structure delineated by the piers, there would be small alcoves for meditation or individual prayer. Such alcoves would be used for daily prayer services, allowing larger crowds on Sabbath or festivals. Boston-based Israeli-Canadian architect Moshe Safdie, who had built extensively in Jerusalem and trained with Kahn in Philadelphia, was also in favour of rebuilding using contemporary design: "It's absurd to reconstruct the Hurva as if nothing had happened. If we have the desire to rebuild it, let's have the courage to have a great architect do it."

When Teddy Kollek, then mayor of Jerusalem, had learned of Kahn's plans to design the Hurva at a scale comparable to the Dome of the Rock and the Kotel, the mayor was unsupportive and stated: "Should we in the Jewish Quarter have a building of major importance which 'competes' with the Mosque and the Holy Sepulcher and should we in general have any building which would compete in importance with the Western Wall of the Temple?" Kollek was also concerned with the impact such a monumental temple may have in the Old City. (Note: The Jerusalem Committee in particular was concerned that such a building would compete in importance with Al-Aqsa, Holy Sepulchre Church and even the Western Wall; the monumentality of Kahn's project was objected by the some Jewish Quarter residents, who preferred a modest building rather a "world synagogue" (the very words Kollek himself used when describing Kahn's proposal).) Kahn's model was displayed in the Israel Museum, but his plan was shelved when he died in 1974. Kent Larson later referred to Kahn's proposal as "the greatest of the unbuilt".

=== Commemorative arch and subsequent proposals ===
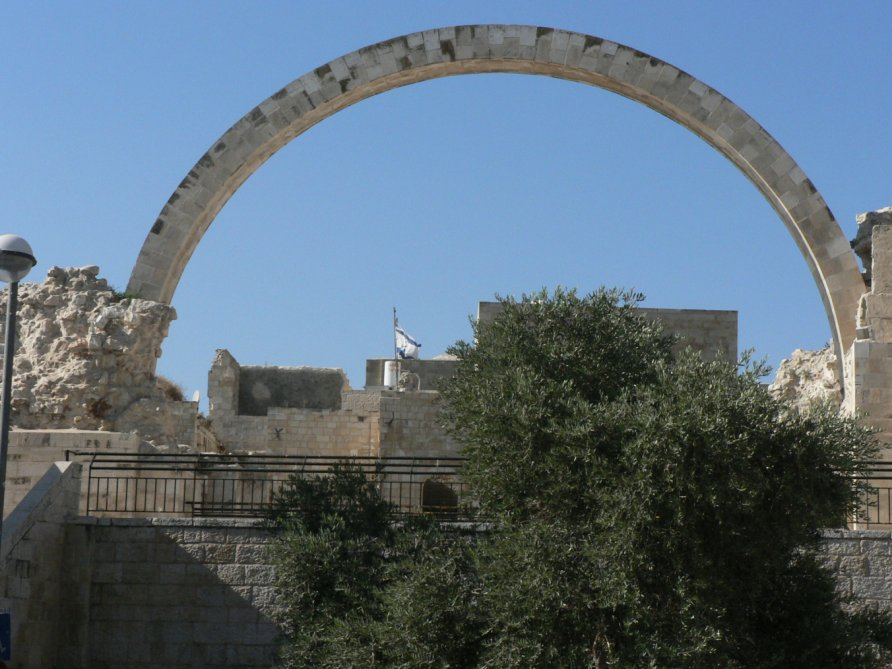
A reminder. The commemorative arch, built in 1977, ten years after the Six-Day War. While all proposals were rejected by the Jerusalem Committee, an arch of the original synagogue was restored as a reminder that "one day the Hurva will be built once again".

As no permanent solution could be agreed upon, a temporary, symbolic solution was created. In 1977, one of the four stone arches that had originally supported the synagogue's monumental dome was recreated. The height of the original building, including the dome, had been 50% greater than that of the new commemorative arch, which stood 16 m (52 ft) high. Together with the remains of the building and explanatory plaques, it was a stark reminder of what had once stood at the site. In 1996, the Hurva rebuilt arch was compared with the ecclesiastical allegory known as Synagoga, a medieval personification of the "Synagogue", with attributes suggesting her ruined condition. (Note: In his book, Meaning in Western Architecture (1974), Christian Norberg-Schulz includes two images relating to the notion of synagogue: one of them is a photograph of Kahn's Hurva Synagogue model (first proposal, 1967–68); the other is a thirteenth-century statue from Strasbourg Cathedral, known as "The Synagogue"—Synagoga.)

With the ongoing disputes over the modern façade of the proposed new building, which some felt did not properly match the Jewish Quarter's aesthetic, an Englishman named Charles Clore took the initiative to fund a new design projects. He commissioned Denys Lasdun, who drew up plans between 1978 and 1981 that more closely adhered to the original Hurva. His plans were still considered insufficient, as they were rejected by Prime Minister Menachem Begin and the Minister of Interior, who refused to sign papers enabling construction to begin. No further progress was made and when Clore, who had wished to see the synagogue completed in his lifetime, died, his daughter provided funds to create one of the few open spaces in the Jewish Quarter adjacent to the Hurva.

The Hurva featured on a NIS 3.60 Israeli postage stamp in 1993 to commemorate 45 years of Israeli independence, and its arch on a $1.20 Antiguan postage stamp in 1996. However, in 1996, the supposedly temporary arch of the Hurva was almost thirty years old and, as a solution, it became nearly perpetual. Such condition was then publicly noted and interpreted:

Quite far from Kahn's "American dream", Israeli reality has provided [...] an [...] objectionable substitute — a single reconstructed arch of the Old Hurva. Such a lonely architectural sign, standing as an insipid memorial to a nineteenth-century synagogue in ruins, cannot be other than a problematic reincarnation of a ruined synagogue.

This suggested that the single reconstructed arch of the Hurva could no longer be understood as a satisfactory expression of any commitment to rebuild the lost synagogue nor as an acceptable official response to its intentional destruction in 1948.

=== Reconstruction (2005–2010) ===
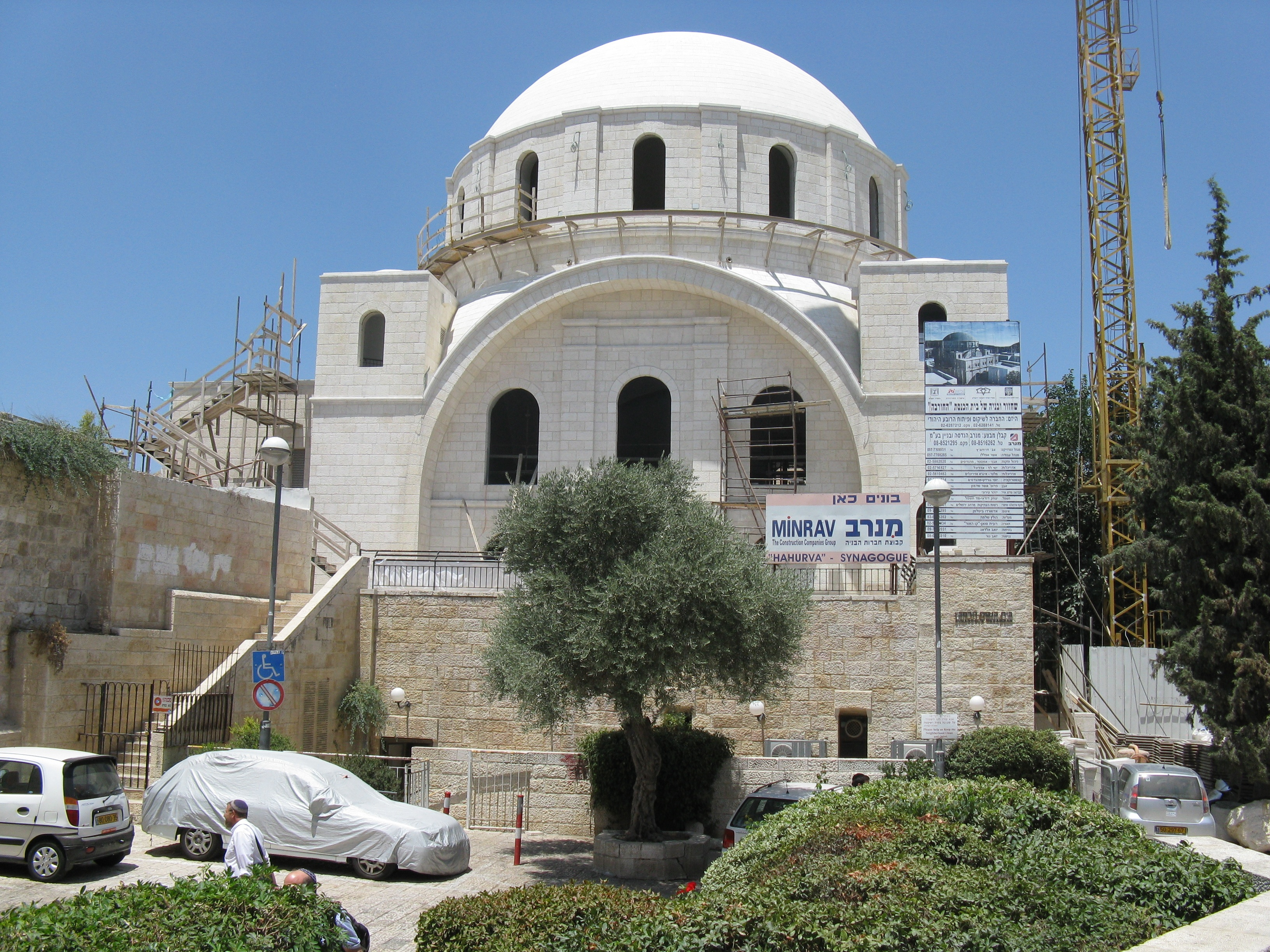
Nearing completion, July 2009

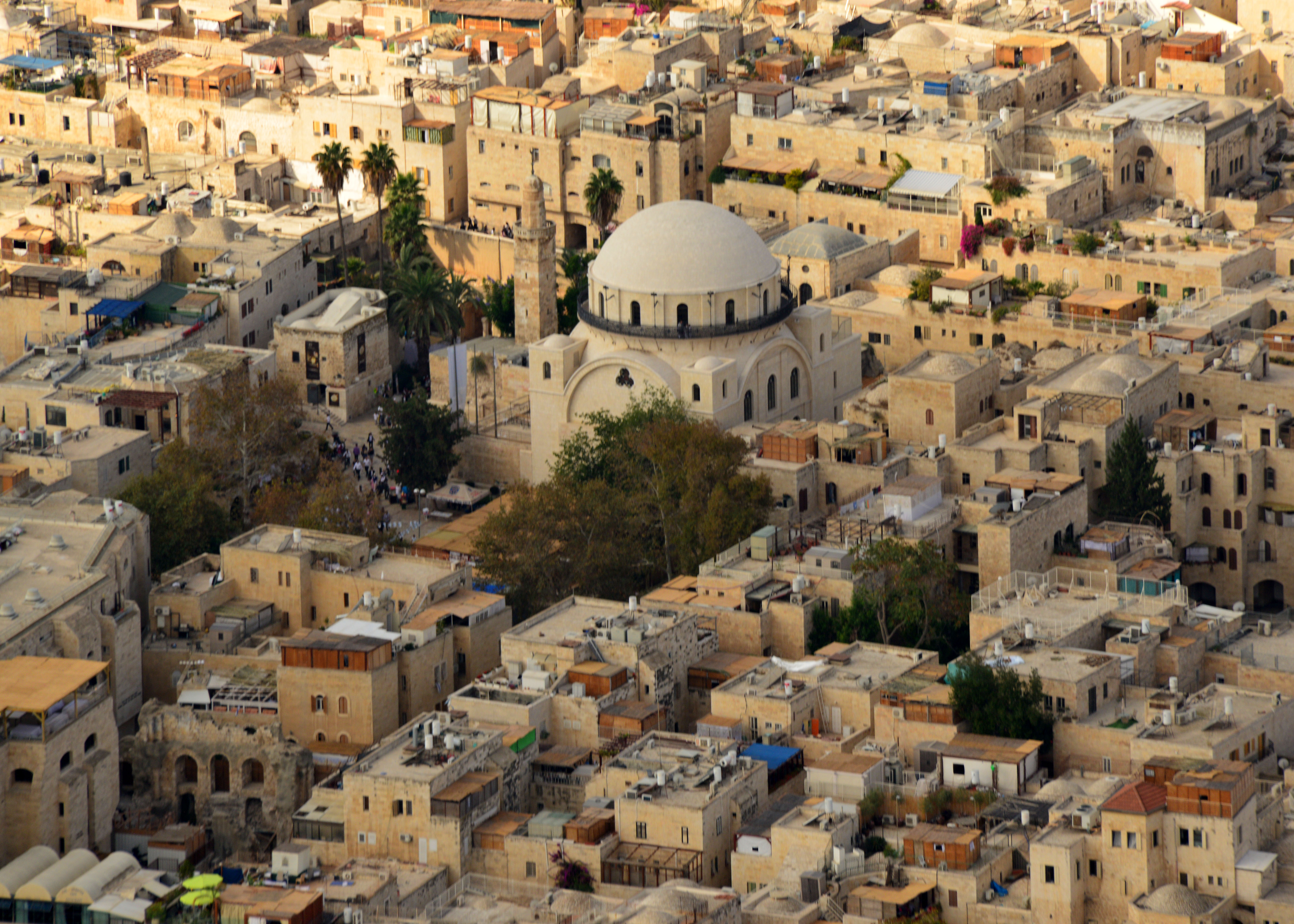
Aerial view, 2014

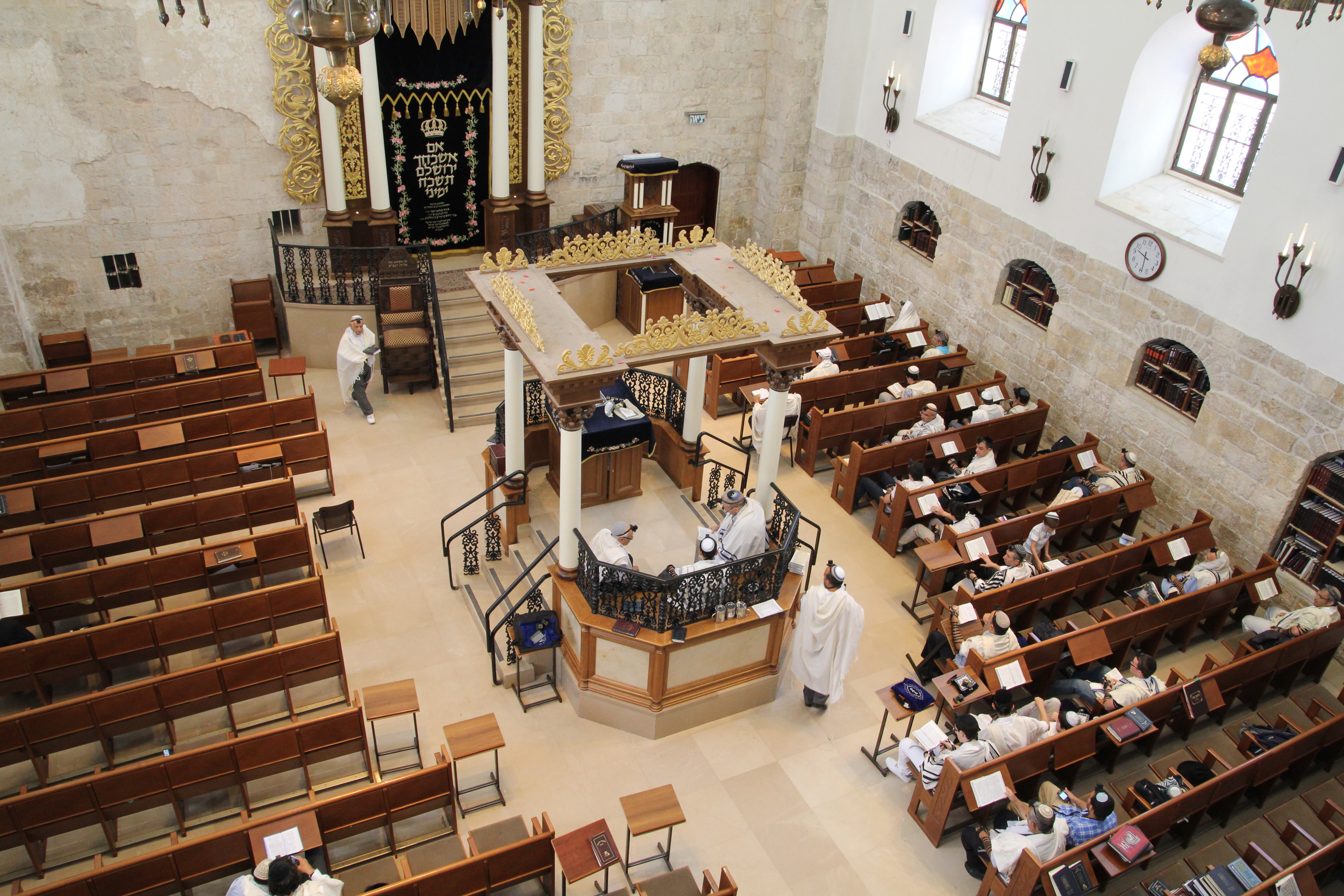
Hurva Synagogue interior during morning prayer, July 2013

The plan to rebuild the synagogue in its original 19th-century style received approval by the Israeli government in 2000. Jerusalem architect Nahum Meltzer, who proposed rebuilding the synagogue in its original Ottoman format, was given the commission. Meltzer stated that "both out of respect for the historical memory of the Jewish people and out of respect for the built-up area of the Old City, it is fitting for us to restore the lost glory and rebuild the Hurva Synagogue the way it was." The state-funded Jewish Quarter Development Corporation under the leadership of Dov Kalmanovich convinced the Israeli government to allocate $6.2 million (NIS 24m), about 85% of the cost, for the reconstruction, with private donors contributing the remainder. In the end, the government only gave NIS 11m, with the remainder being donated by a Ukrainian Jewish businessman and politician, Vadim Rabinovitch.

In 2002 the Israeli mint issued a set of medals featuring the synagogue to mark the beginning of the reconstruction project. Following comprehensive historic research, the reconstruction works began in 2005 and on February 15, 2007, Simcha HaKohen Kook of Rehovot was appointed as its rabbi, a move confirmed by leading rabbis, including Yosef Shalom Eliashiv. On April 15, 2008 a celebration marked the placing of the keystone in the synagogue's dome. Following Simcha HaKohen Kook's death, Rabbi Eliyahu Zilberman, rosh yeshiva of Yeshivat Aderet Eliyahu, was appointed rabbi of the synagogue.

Contention arose over what kind of institution the Hurva would be. A group of Secularist and nationalist-religious activists opposed the notion of another synagogue in the Old City and wanted the site to become a museum presenting the historical saga of the Jewish Quarter and displaying archaeological finds unearthed there. They viewed the appointment of Kook as the rabbi while the structure was still a shell as a move aimed at preventing a Modern Orthodox rabbi, who would have been more amenable to a broader utilisation of the site, from getting the position. Rabbi of the Jewish Quarter, Avigdor Nebenzahl, has been clear that he wants the building to serve as a synagogue and a house of study.

== Rededication and response ==
The reconstructed Hurva was officially opened on March 15, 2010 in the presence of Israeli politicians and chief rabbis. A day earlier, hundreds of people had accompanied a new Torah scroll into the synagogue. Several Palestinian leaders claimed that the rededication signaled Israel's intent to destroy the Muslim holy places on the Temple Mount and replace it with the Third Temple. Fatah official Khatem Abd el-Khader called the renovation of the Hurva a "provocation", warned Israel that it was "playing with fire" and called on Palestinians to "converge on Al-Aksa to save it". Fearing riots by Arab protestors, over 3,000 policemen were deployed ahead of the dedication ceremony. The Organisation of the Islamic Conference said that the reopening risked "dragging the region into a religious war" and claimed the building was historically on a waqf (Islamic trust) land. The Jordanian government also condemned the move stating that it "categorically rejects the rededication of Hurva synagogue and all other unilateral Israeli measures in occupied East Jerusalem because they run counter to international legitimacy". Iran's Foreign Ministry urged the international community to respond to the reopening calling the move a "catastrophe that has distressed the Islamic world". Israeli officials countered that Arab fears of a takeover of the Temple Mount were based on rumors and Israeli prime minister Benjamin Netanyahu extended a message of coexistence. The U.S. State Department criticised Palestinians for stoking tensions at the rededication of the historic synagogue. The day after, Arabs clashed with Israeli police in East Jerusalem after Palestinian groups called for a "day of rage" over the reopening.

In September 2010, Hamas released a propaganda video showing various Israeli landmarks, including the Hurva synagogue, ablaze after coming under missile attack. The images were the result of special effects, as no such attacks had taken place.

== Cultural depictions ==
- The Hurva Synagogue, as an emblem of Jerusalem and its Jewish heritage, has been portrayed over the years in numerous paintings, and referred to in literature and culture. The synagogue was portrayed, for example, in works by artists Yossef Gaiger, Jonathan Kis-Lev, and in the works of Holocaust survivor, artist Motke Blum. For decades, the synagogue's arch has been the emblem of the Jewish quarter in the works of artists portraying the old city.
- Computer graphic reconstructions of Louis Kahn's unbuilt project were made by Kent Larson (MIT, early 1990s), and further developed in terms of animation by Francesco Cerbella & Federico Caponi (University of Florence, November 2013).

== Gallery ==
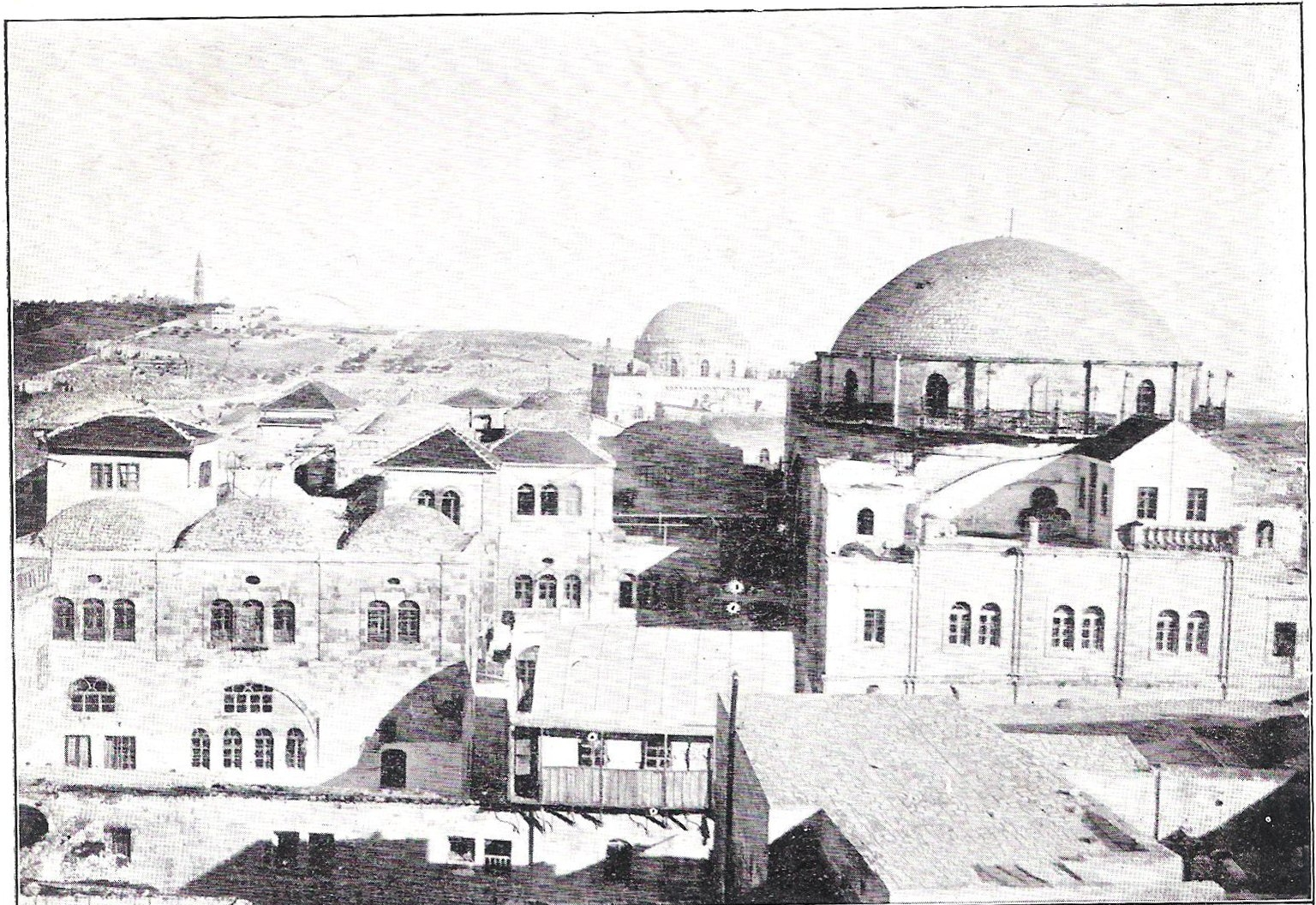
c. 1898

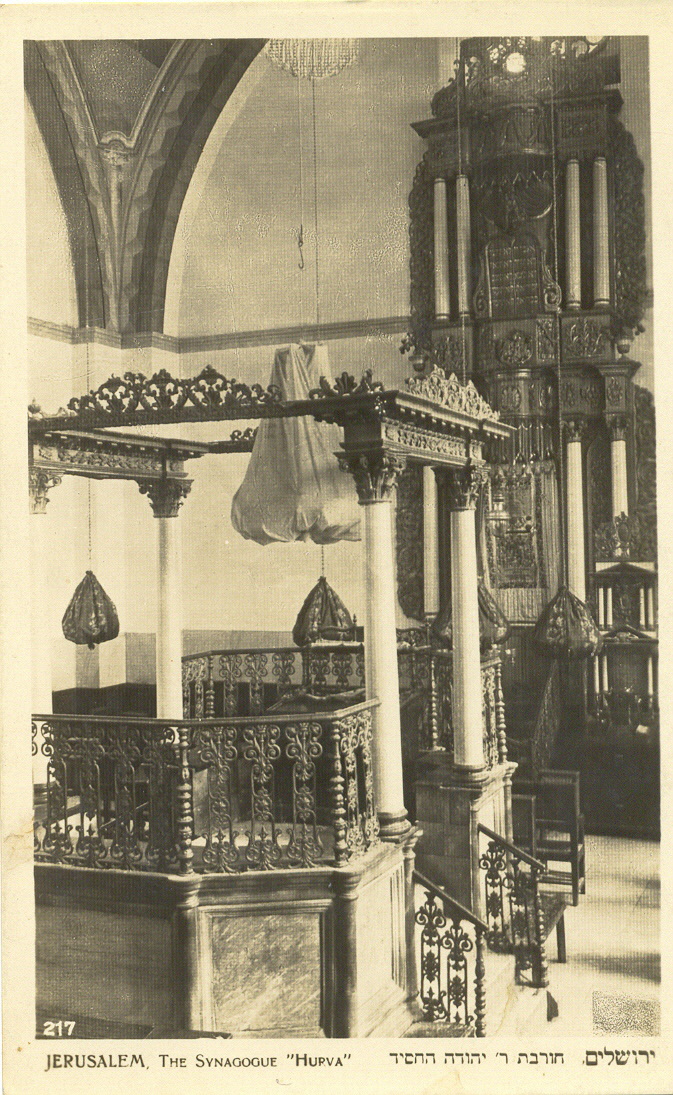
Interior, 1920

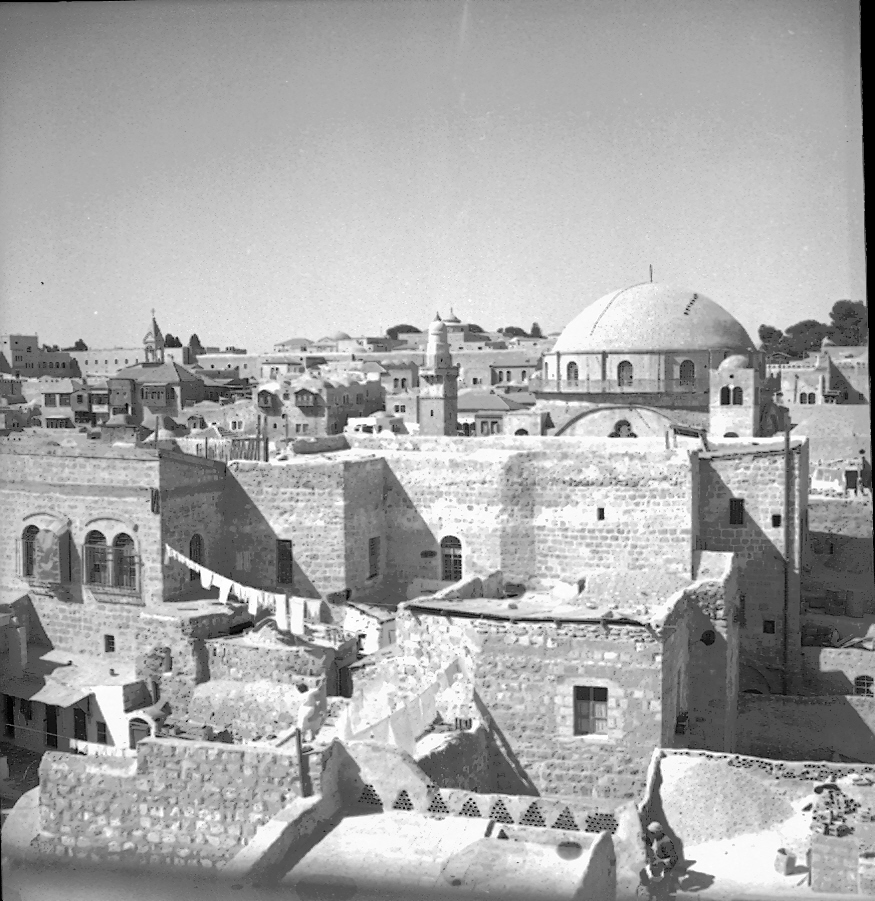
1934

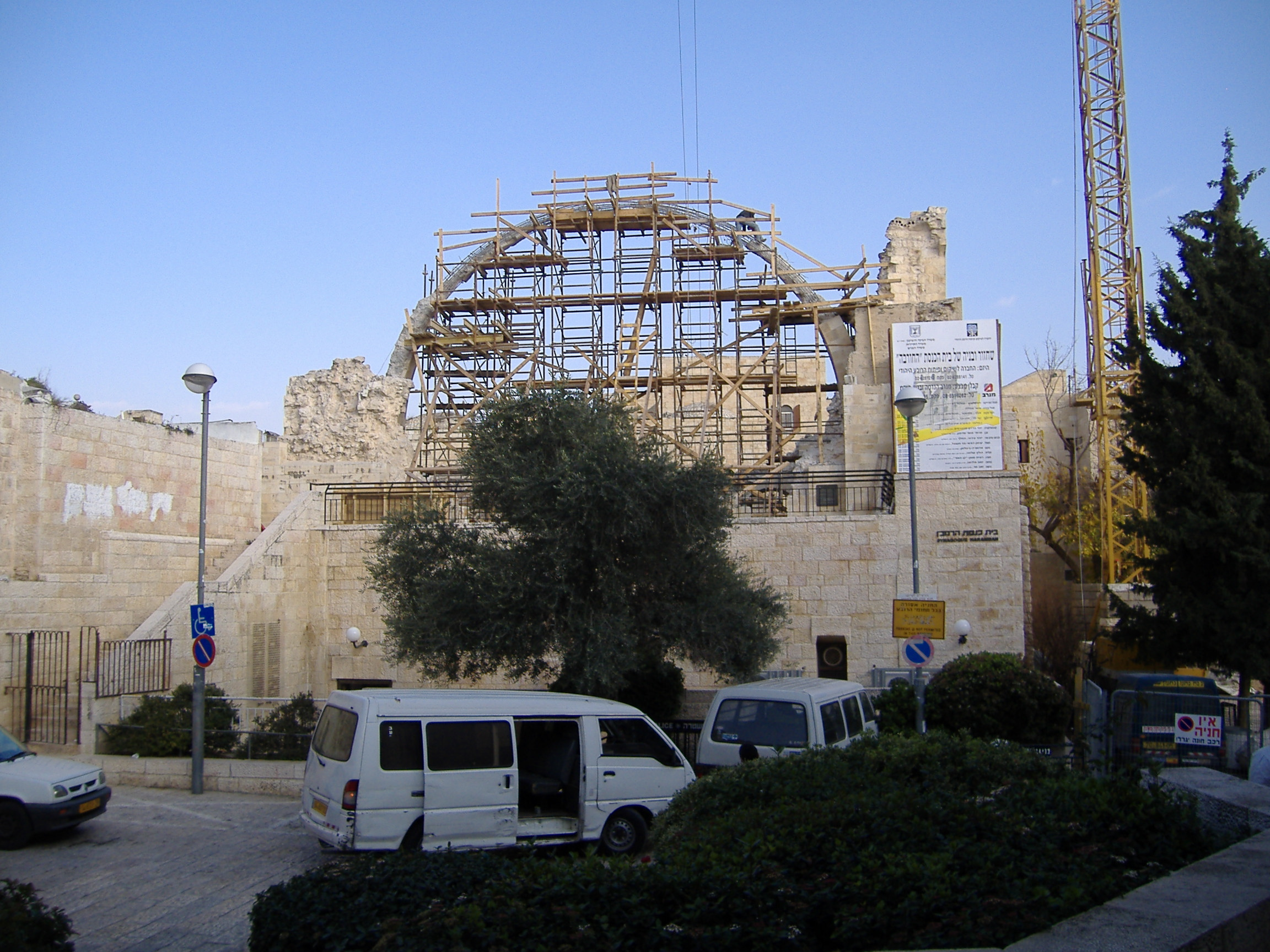
Removal of the memorial arch, 2006

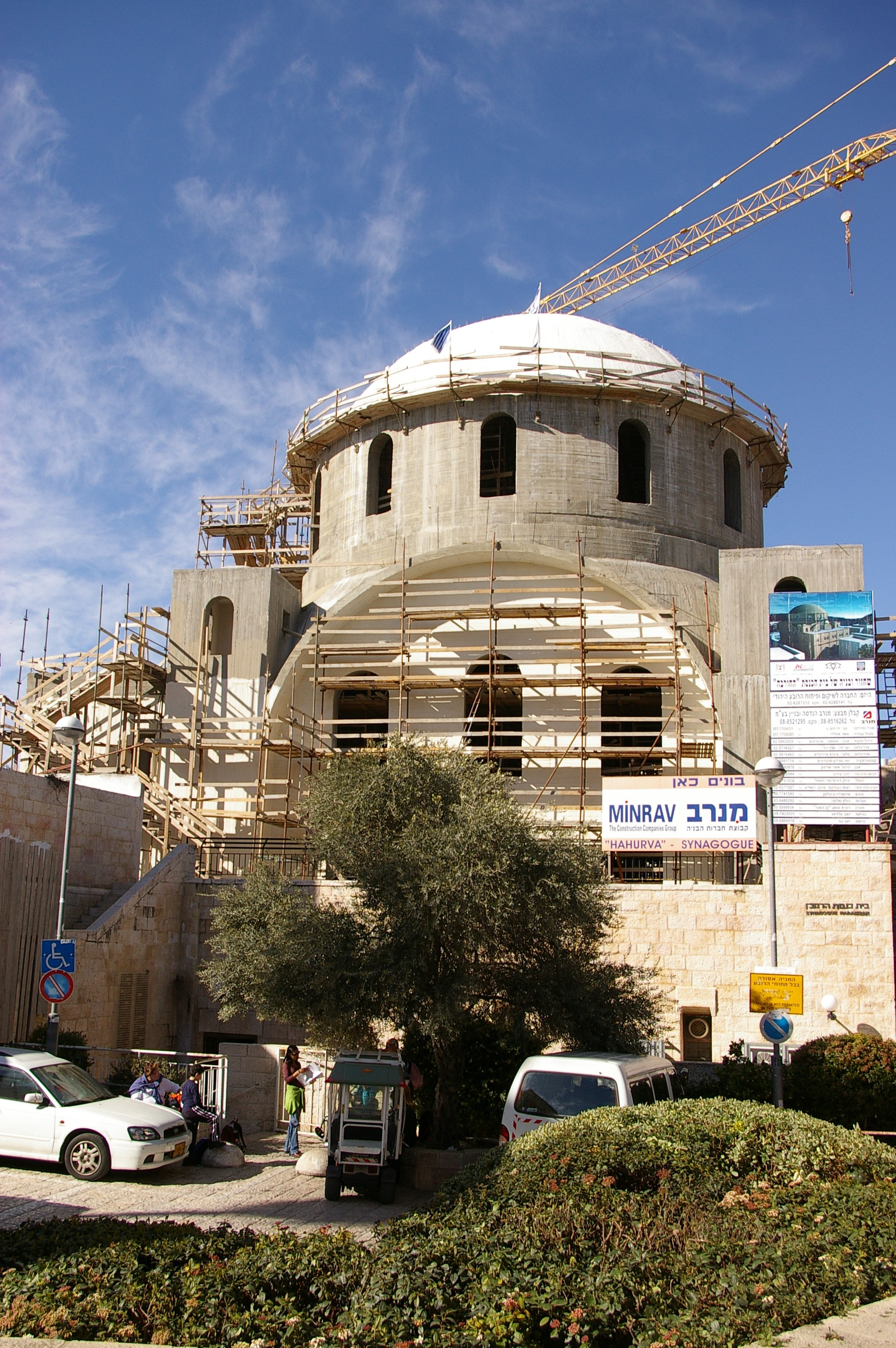
Reconstruction, 2008

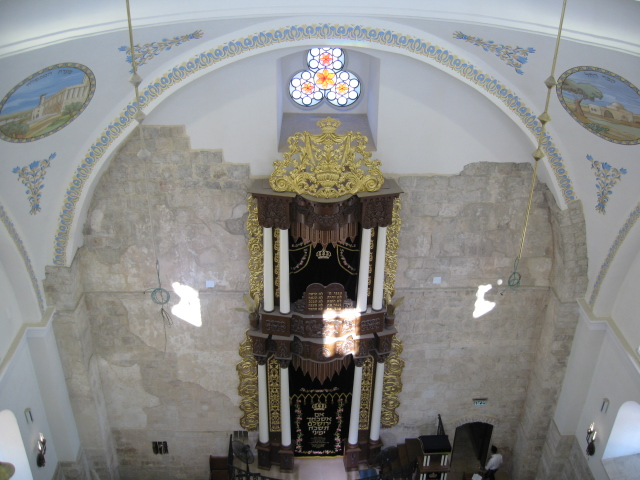
Interior, 2010

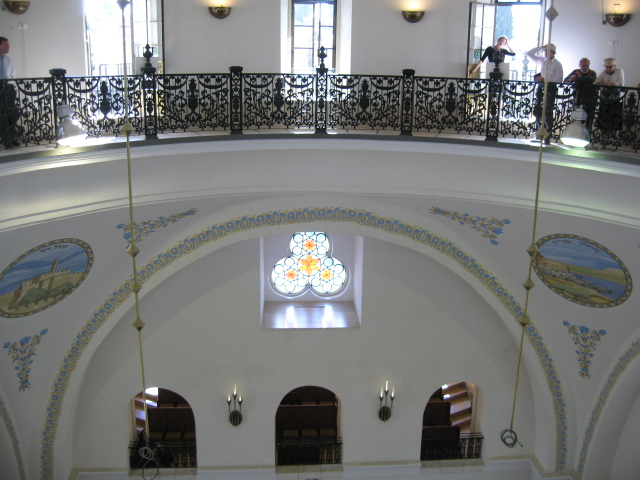
Gallery

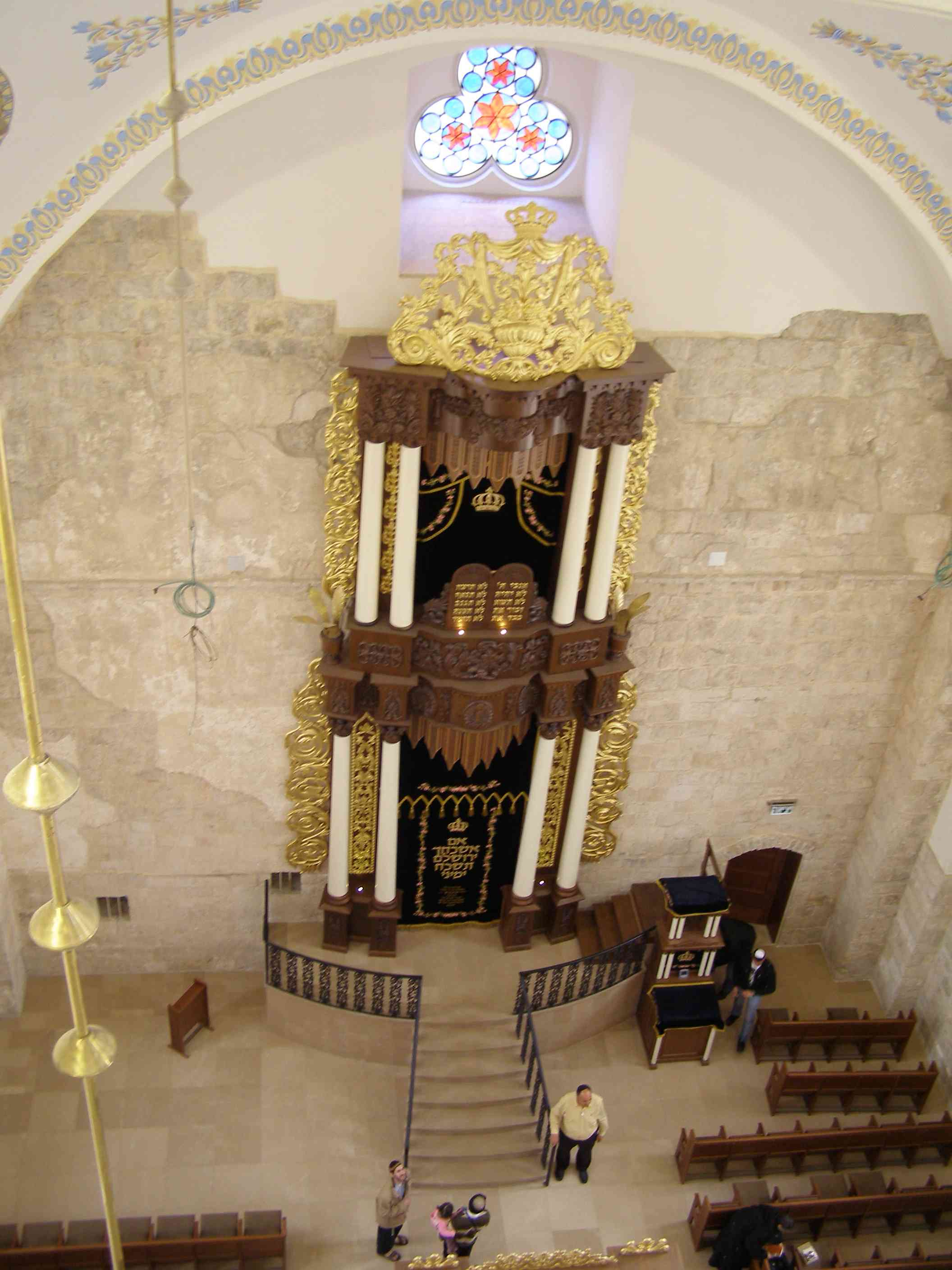
Ark

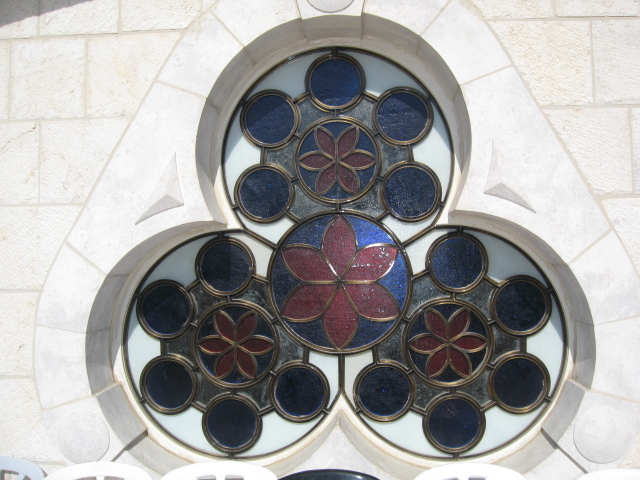
Stained glass, exterior

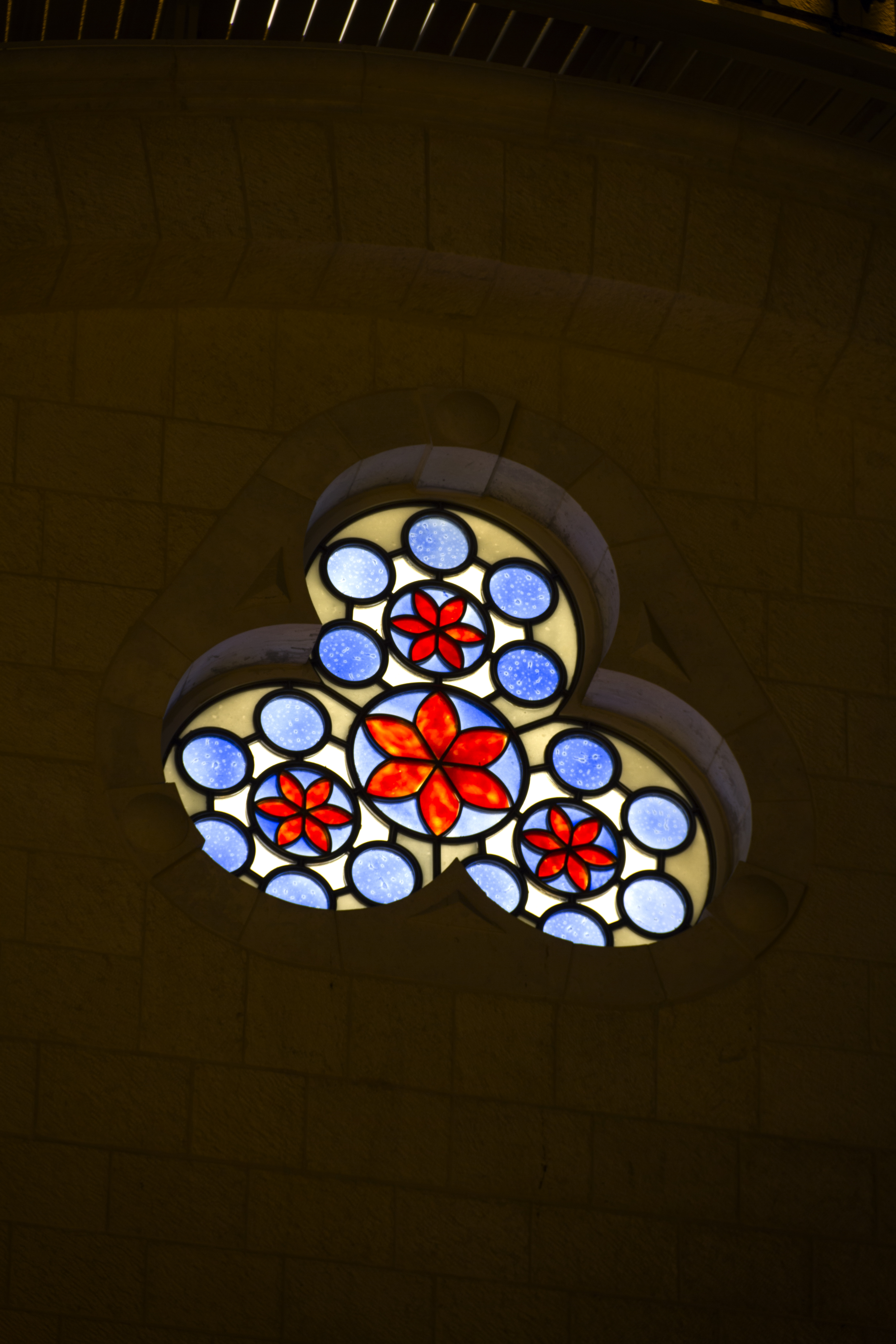
Stained glass, interior. Inspired by Bunting clover leaf map of Jerusalem, 1581

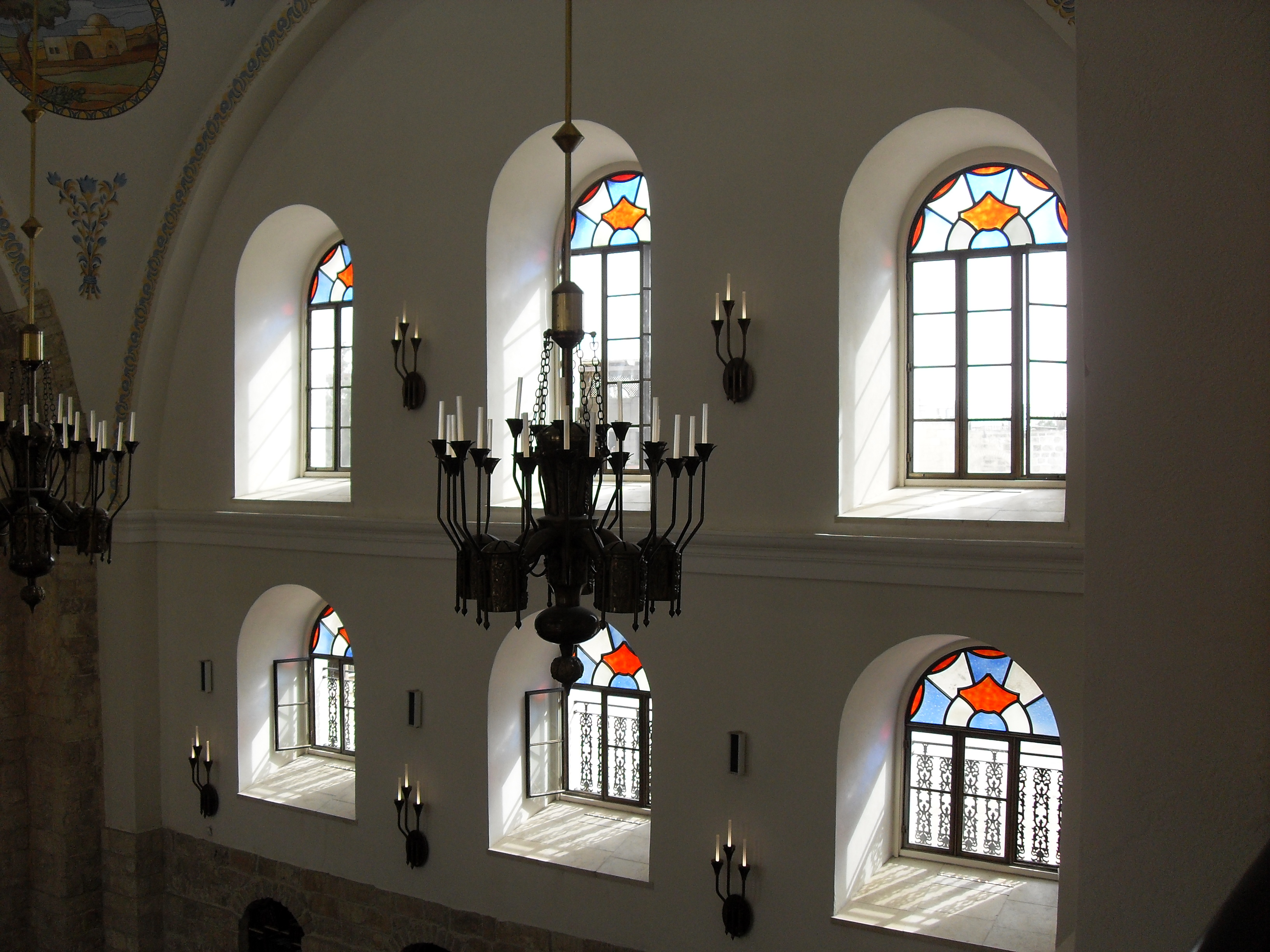
Windows

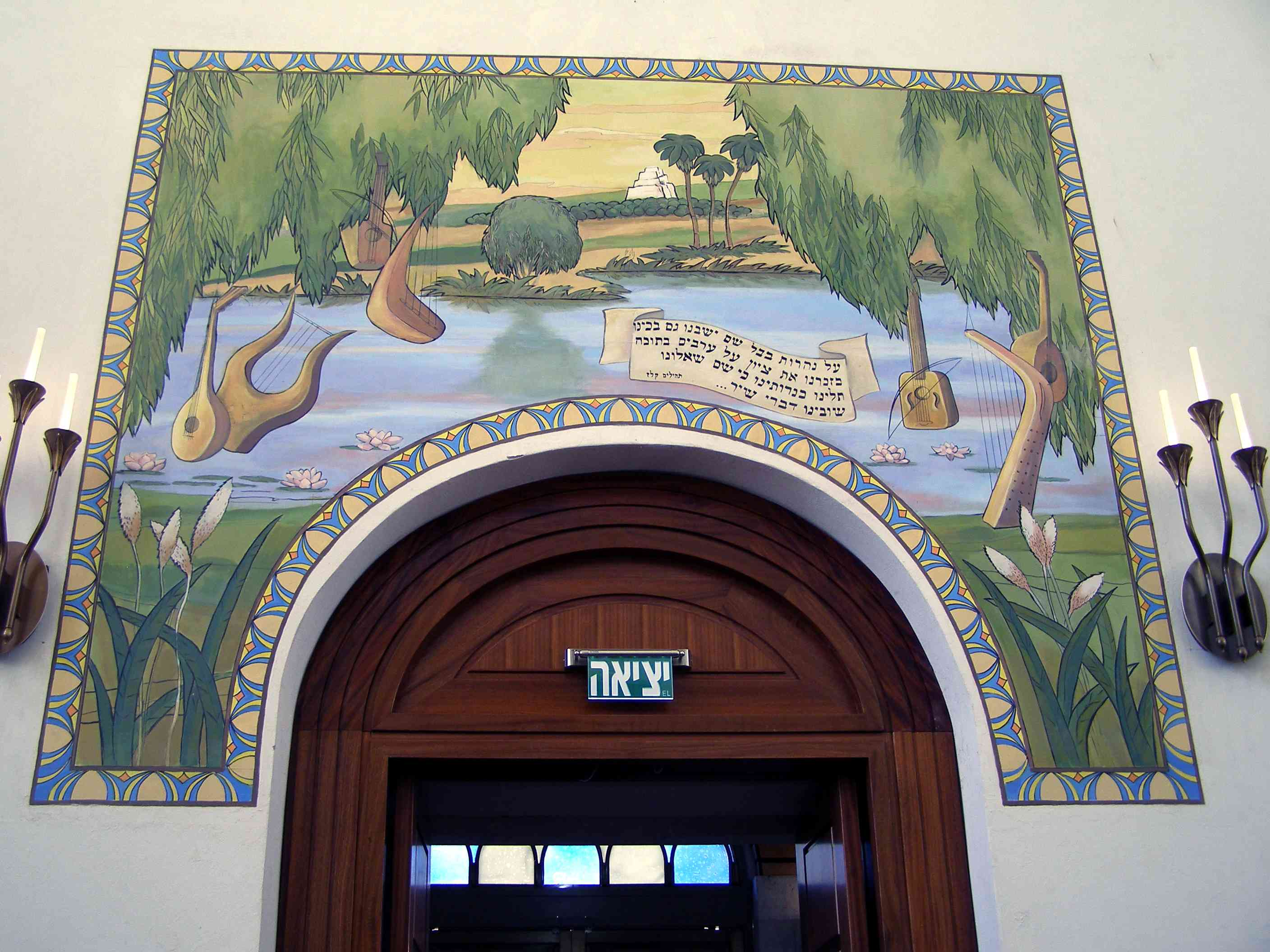
Mural inspired by Psalm 137: "By the rivers of Babylon"

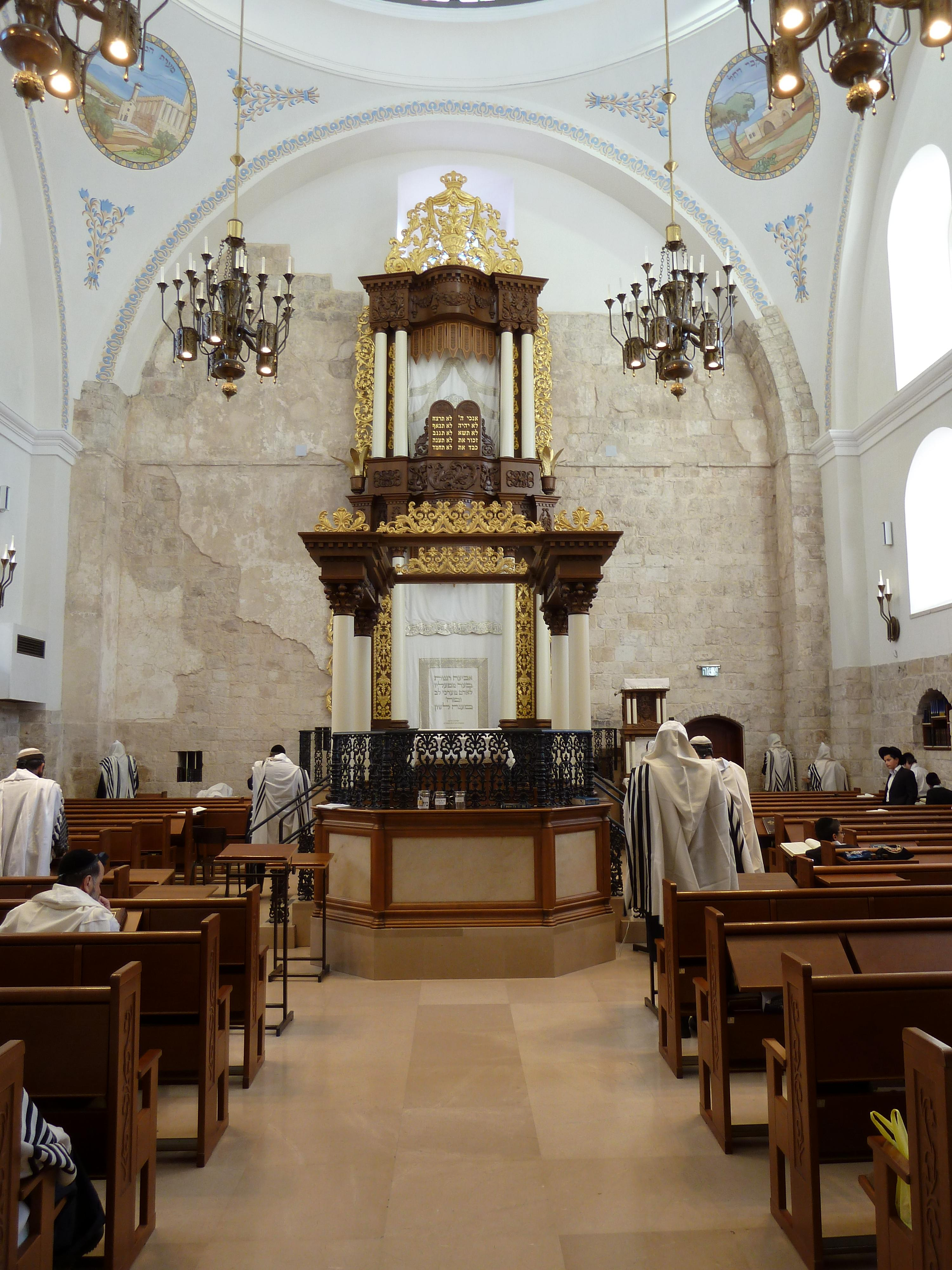
Morning prayer service

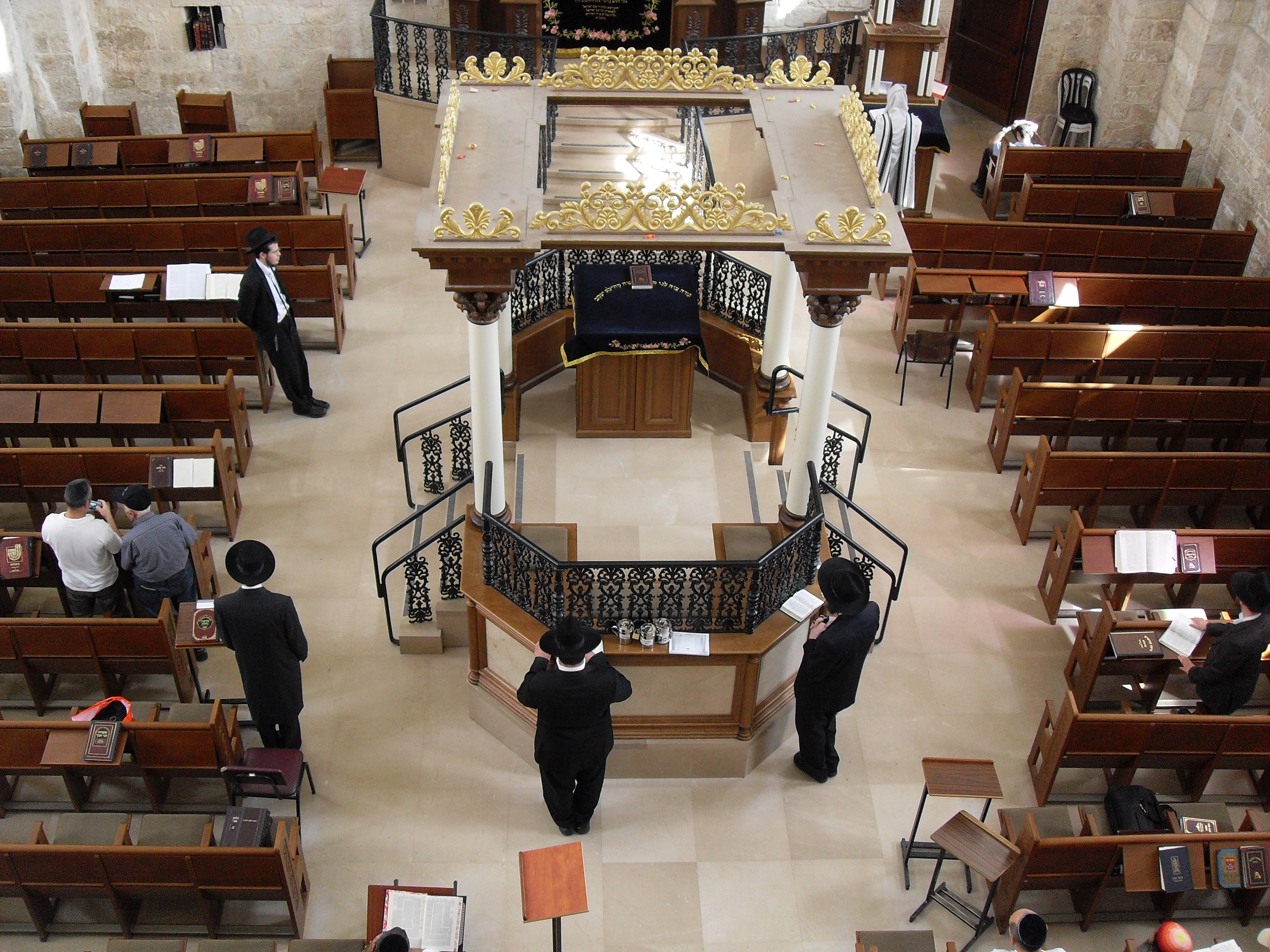
Bimah

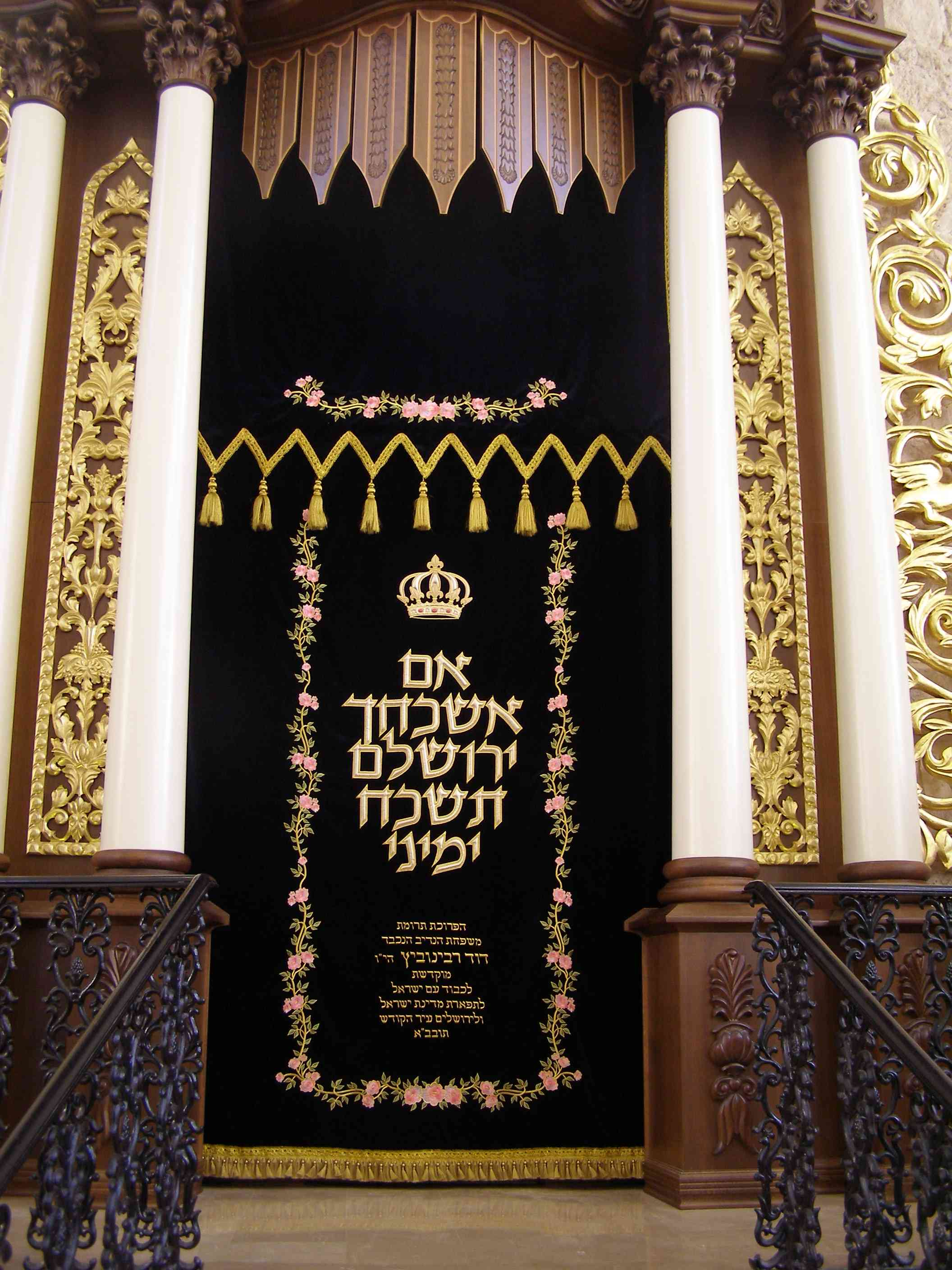
Parokhet, with Psalm 137: "If I forget you, oh Jerusalem..."

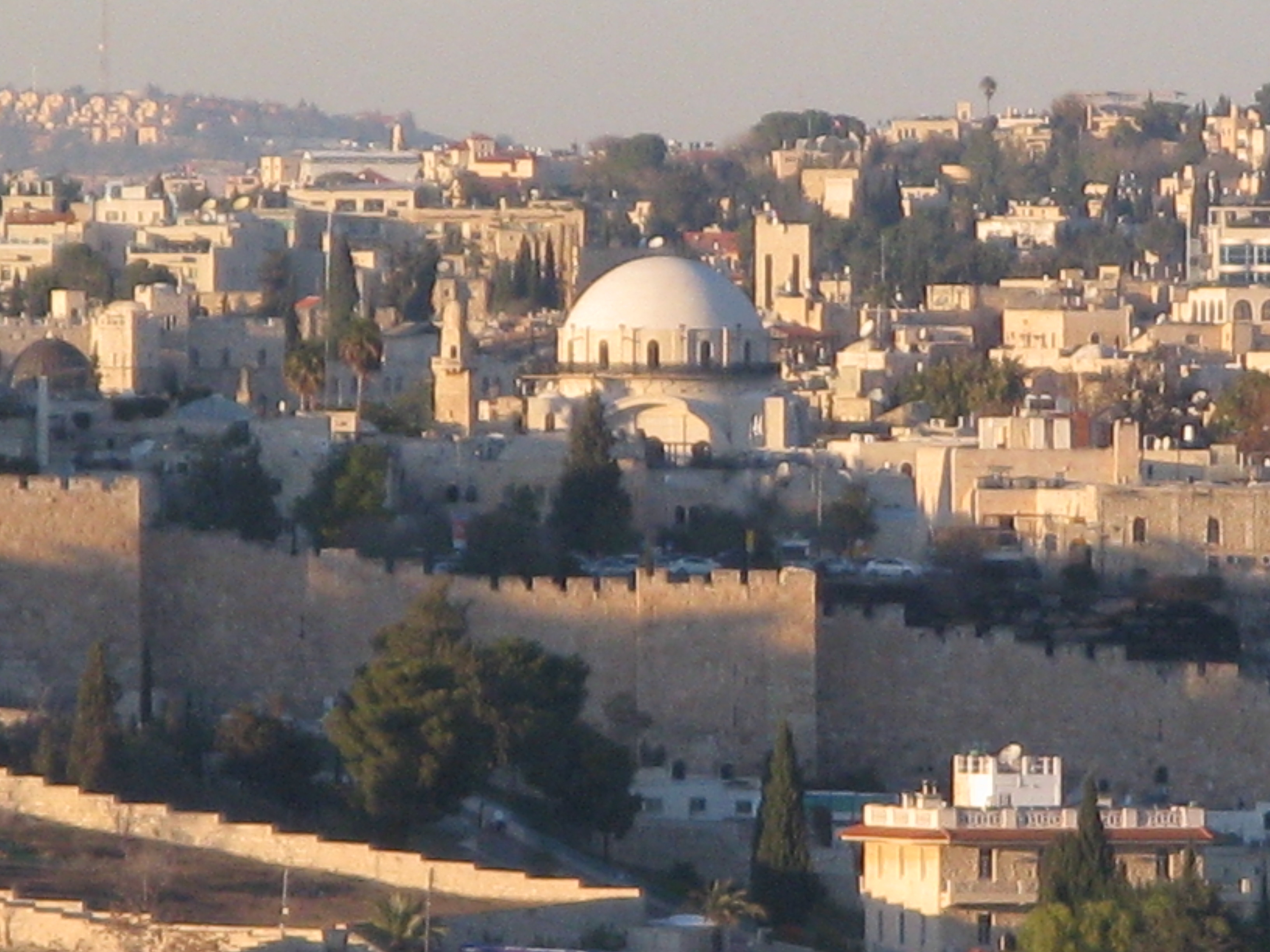
Urban surroundings, Jerusalem

== See also ==
- History of the Jews in Israel
- List of synagogues in Israel
- Synagogues of Jerusalem

== Bibliography ==
=== Books ===
- Akerman, Luis Mariano (1996). "The Evocative Character of Louis I. Kahn's Hurva Synagogue Project, 1967–1974". In Kühnel, Bianca (ed.). The Real and Ideal Jerusalem in Jewish, Christian and Islamic Art (1997–98 ilus. ed.). CFJA. pp. 245–53. ISBN 9-6539-1007-8.
- Ben-Arieh, Yehoshua. Jerusalem in the Nineteenth Century, The Old City, St. Martin's Press, 1985. ISBN 0-312-44187-8
- Benveniśtî, Mêrôn. Son of the cypresses: memories, reflections, and regrets from a political life, University of California Press, 2007. ISBN 0-520-23825-7
- Blumberg, Arnold & Finn, James and Elizabeth Anne. A View from Jerusalem, 1849–1858, Fairleigh Dickinson University Press, 1981. ISBN 0-8386-2271-2
- Brinker, Dov Nathan (1947 - Elul), The Jerusalem Almanac for the year 1948 (לוח ירושלים לשנת התש"ח ליצירה), p. 89 (in Hebrew) (OCLC 243425225)
- Collins, Larry & Lapierre, Dominique. O Jerusalem!, Pan Books, 1973. LCCN 97-224015 ISBN 0-330-23514-1
- Finn, James. Stirring Times, Adamant Media Corporation, 2004; [C. Kegan Paul & Co., London, 1878]. ISBN 1-4021-5089-X
- Gilbert, Martin. Jerusalem, Rebirth of a City, Chatto & Windus, 1985. ISBN 0-7011-2892-5
- Gilbert, Martin. Jerusalem in the Twentieth Century, Chatto & Windus, 1996. ISBN 0-7011-3070-9
- Gordon, Benjamin Lee. New Judea: Jewish life in modern Palestine and Egypt, Ayer Publishing, 1977; [J. H. Greenstone, 1919]. ISBN 0-405-10251-8
- Halper, Jeff (1991). Between Redemption and Revival: The Jewish Yishuv of Jerusalem in the Nineteenth Century. Avalon. ISBN 9780813378558., Westview Press, 1991. ISBN 0-8133-7855-9
- Horovitz, Ahron. Jerusalem, Footsteps Through Time, Feldheim, 2000. ISBN 1-58330-398-7
- Kroyanker, David. Jerusalem Architecture, Tauris Parke Books, 1994. ISBN 1-85043-873-0
- Maoz, Moshe. Studies on Palestine during the Ottoman period, Magnes Press, 1975.
- Millgram, Abraham Ezra. Jerusalem Curiosities, Jewish Publication Society, 1990. ISBN 0-8276-0358-4
- Morgenstern, Arie. Hastening Redemption, Oxford University Press, 2006. ISBN 0-19-530578-7
- Rabinovich, Itamar & Reinharz, Jehuda. Israel in the Middle East, UPNE, 2008. ISBN 0-87451-962-4
- Ricca, Simone. Reinventing Jerusalem, I.B. Tauris, 2007. ISBN 184511387X
- Rossoff, Dovid. Where Heaven Touches Earth, Guardian Press, 1998. ISBN 0-87306-879-3
- Safdie, Moshe. Jerusalem: The Future of the Past, Houghton Mifflin, 1989. ISBN 0-395-35375-0
- Shulman, Yaakov Dovid. Pathway to Jerusalem: The Travel Letters of Rabbi Ovadiah of Bartenura, CIS Publishers, 1992. ISBN 1-56062-130-3
- Shteiner, Pu'ah. Forever My Jerusalem Feldheim, 1997. ISBN 0873063945
- Wasserstein, Bernard. Divided Jerusalem, Yale University Press, 2008. ISBN 030013763X
- Vale, Lawrence J. & Campanella, Thomas J. The resilient city: how modern cities recover from disaster, Oxford University Press US, 2005. ISBN 0-19-517583-2

=== Newspapers, magazines, and the media ===
- Akerman, Luis Mariano. "La Sinagoga Hurva en el proyecto de Louis Kahn" (1996), Ideas en Arquitectura, ed. Alfonso Corona Martínez, Vol. 1, No. 1, Buenos Aires: Fundación Universidad de Begrano, March 1997, pp. 6–9, ilus.
- Balint, Benjamin. "In the Holy Land: A Rebuilding for the Generations", The Wall Street Journal, March 10, 2010. Accessed May 21, 2014
- Green, David. "Rising from the Ruin?", The Jerusalem Report, December 12, 1996, pp. 40–41.
- Green, David. "From the ruins: A master architect's attempt to rebuild on sacred ground", The Boston Globe, February 29, 2004. Accessed July 25, 2007
- Hasson, Nir. "If the Vilna Gaon was right, the 3rd Temple is on its way", Haaretz, November 30, 2009. Accessed March 10, 2010
- "The Hurva returns to life", Chadrei Charedim, February 20, 2007. Accessed March 11, 2010.
- Kempinski, Yoni. "First Visit to the Rebuilt Hurva Synagogue", Arutz Sheva, August 3, 2010. Accessed May 21, 2014
- Lefkovits, Etgar. ""Hurva Synagogue restoration nears completion""., Jerusalem Post, March 28, 2008. Accessed October 25, 2008
- Lis, Jonathan. "Ruined synagogue to get new arch", Haaretz, April 15, 2008. Accessed October 25, 2008
- Rigler, Sara Yoheved. "Destroying Synagogues Again" Archived July 25, 2020, at the Wayback Machine, Aish.com, September 13, 2005. Accessed November 2, 2008
- Rosenfeld, Gavriel. "A New Ruin Rising: The Hurva Synagogue's Latest Incarnation", The Forward, November 9, 2007, p. B1. Accessed May 21, 2014
- Rossoff, Dovid. "The Churva Synagogue", Jewish Magazine, December 1997. Accessed October 25, 2008
- Shragai, Nadav. "Out of the ruins", Haaretz, December 20, 2005. Accessed January 8, 2007
- Shragai, Nadav. "Byzantine arch found at site of renovated Jerusalem synagogue", Haaretz, November 28, 2006. Accessed July 25, 2007
- Shragai, Nadav. "The first official victim of terror", Haaretz, May 5, 2008. Accessed August 11, 2008
