= Selbourne =

Selbourne may refer to:

People

- David Selbourne, British political commentator
- Raphael Selbourne, British author

Places

- Selbourne, Tasmania

See also

- Selborne
