= Four Sephardic Synagogues =

Sephardic religious complex in Jerusalem

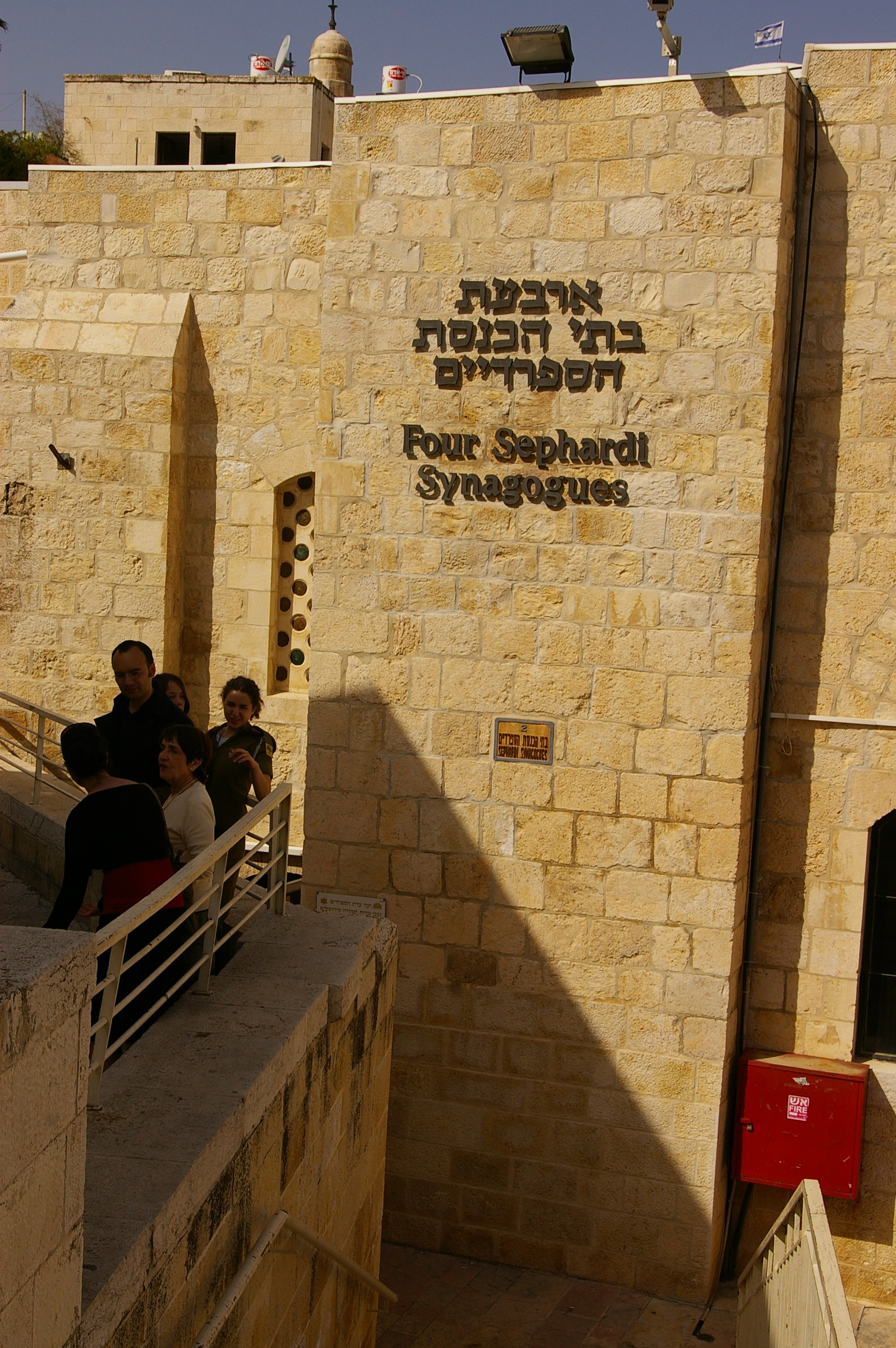
- The synagogue complex in 2008

- Location of the complex in the Old City of Jerusalem

Religion
- Affiliation: Judaism
- Ecclesiastical or organisational status: Synagogues
- Status: Active

Location
- Location: Old City of Jerusalem
- Coordinates: 31°46′28″N 35°13′54″E

Architecture
- Completed: From 16th to 18th centuries
- Materials: Jerusalem stone

The Four Sephardic Synagogues are a complex of four adjoining synagogues located in the Jewish Quarter of the Old City of Jerusalem.

The four synagogues include:

- the Eliahu Ha'navi Synagogue (established c. 1586),
- the Yochanan ben Zakai Synagogue (whose current building dates to the beginning of the 17th century),
- the Istanbuli Synagogue (established c. 1764), and
- the Emtsai Synagogue ("Middle Synagogue," also known as the Kahal Tzion Synagogue) formed from a courtyard amidst the synagogues that was roofed in the mid-18th century.

The synagogues were built to accommodate the religious needs of Jerusalem's Sephardic community, with each congregation practicing a different rite, and most remain in active use.

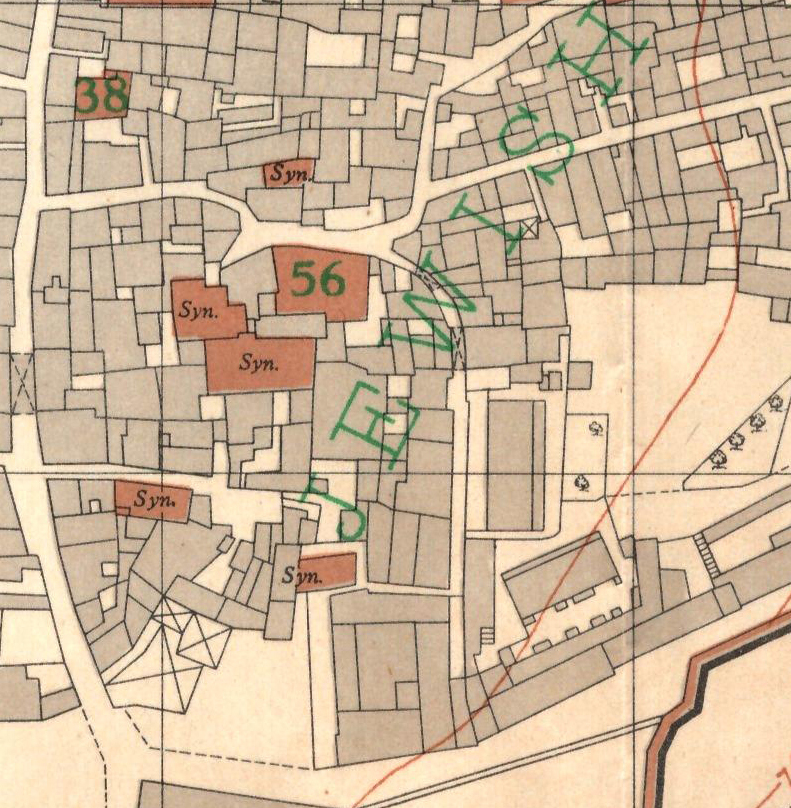
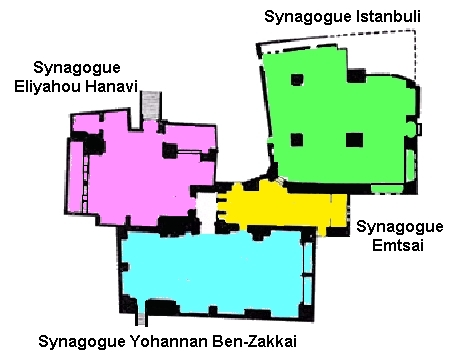
The four synagogues; the left hand map is a 1936–47 Survey of Palestine map (only three of the synagogues are highlighted)

== History ==
In 1586, the Ottoman government closed the Ramban Synagogue (est. 1400) because it shared a wall with a mosque. As the only other synagogue in Jerusalem at the time belonged to the Karaite minority, followers of mainstream Rabbinic Judaism, including many descendants of refugees from the 1492 expulsion from Spain, held services in private homes for several years until completing the new Yochanan ben Zakai Synagogue nearby.

In 1835, Muhammad Ali, viceroy of Egypt who ruled Jerusalem at the time, permitted the refurbishment of the synagogues which had been denied since their construction. At the entrance to the Istanbuli Synagogue is a plaque commemorating the restoration.

In 1845, Joseph Schwarz, considered by the Jewish Encyclopedia as "the greatest Jewish authority on Palestinian matters since Estori Farḥi" stated that the buildings were knocked down and completely rebuilt:

All these four Synagogues form, properly speaking, but a very large single building, since they stand near one another, so that one can walk from one into the other, and the centre one, the smallest of all, has no entrance from the street, and you have to reach it through either of the three others. On my arrival, in the year 5593 (1833), I found them in a most miserable and lamentable condition, since they were at the time greatly out of repair, and almost threatened to tumble in, and were useless in rainy weather, inasmuch as they were roofed in with nothing but old and rotten boarding, and our brothers could not obtain the permission from "the pious faithful" to drive as much as a single nail to fasten anything in the building without being first authorized by the most worthy persons in authority… But in the year 5595, Abraim Pacha of Egypt, who understood and was able to instruct and convince his people "that even the Nebbi had grown more tolerant in modern times," gave the permission to rebuild anew from the foundation all these four Synagogues, and they are accordingly at present four fine buildings.

After the fall of the Jewish Quarter during the 1948 Arab–Israeli War the synagogues were damaged by shell fire. During the Jordanian rule, between 1948 and 1967 the buildings of synagogues were used as donkey stables. After the Six-Day War the synagogues were restored by architect Dan Tanai.

== Individual synagogues ==
Yochanan ben Zakai Synagogue
- Hebrew: בית הכנסת יוחנן בן זכאי
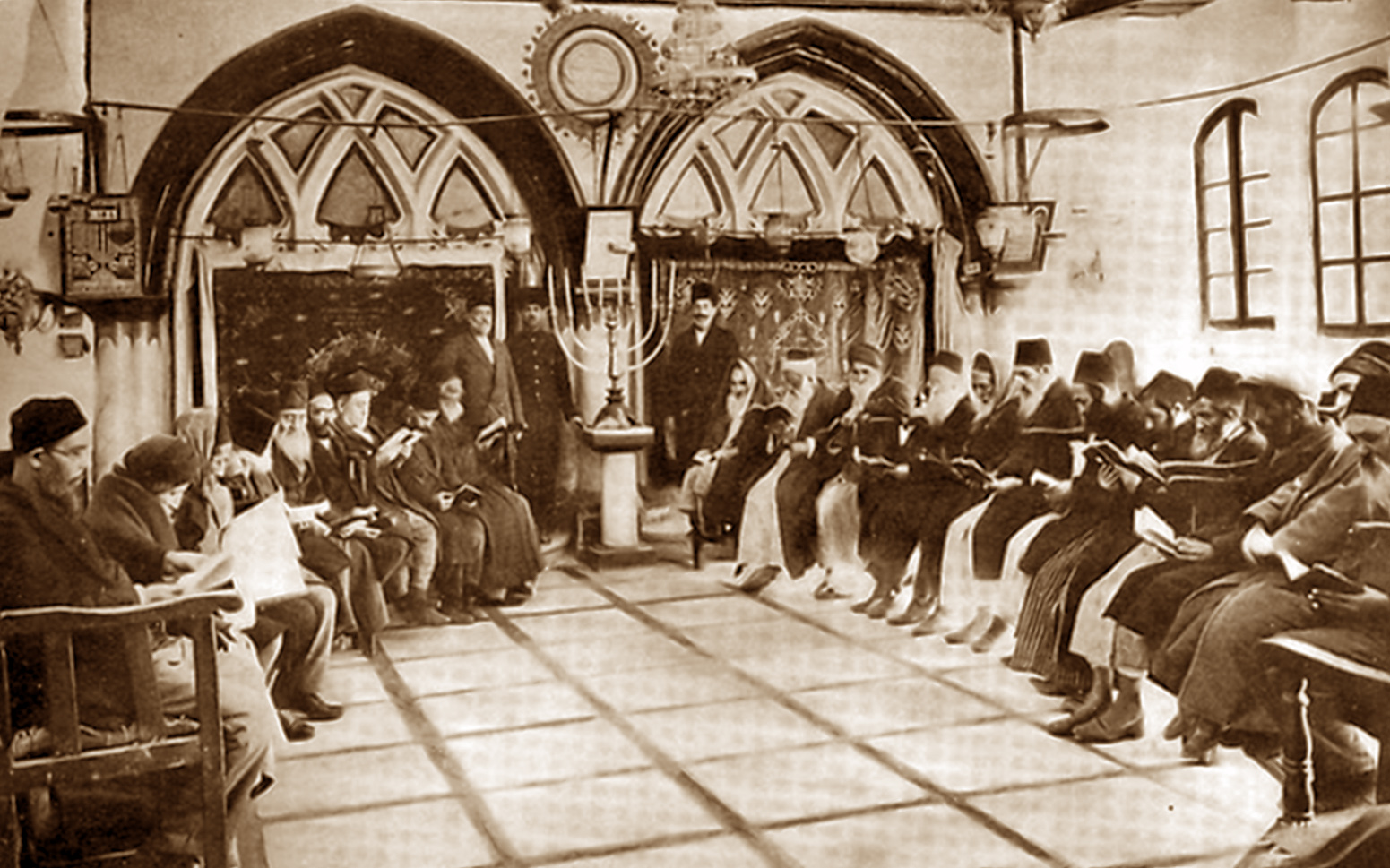
- Installation of the Jerusalem Chacham Bashi at ben Zakai Synagogue (1893)

Religion
- Affiliation: Judaism
- Ecclesiastical or organisational status: Synagogue
- Status: Active

Location
- Location: Old City of Jerusalem
- Interactive map of Yochanan ben Zakai Synagogue

Architecture
- Completed: 17th century (current building)

Istanbuli Synagogue
- Hebrew: בית הכנסת האיסטנבולי
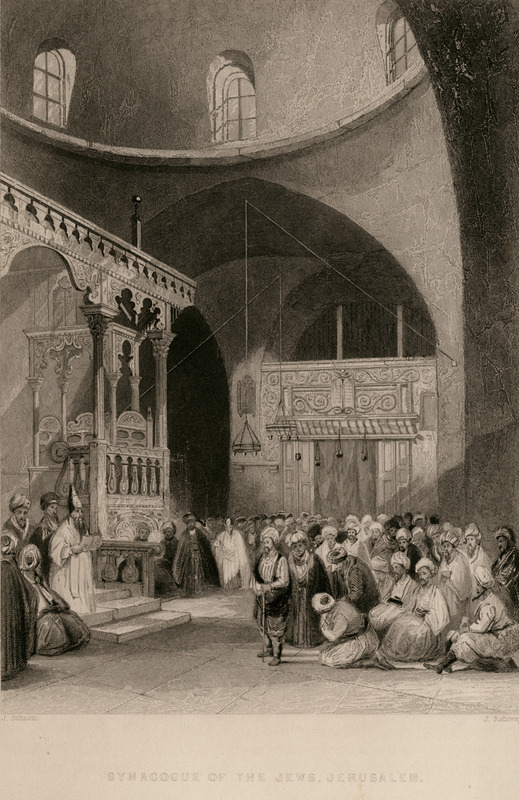
- The synagogue, in c. 1825 (steel engraving from John Carne travelogue, publ. 1836)

Religion
- Affiliation: Judaism
- Ecclesiastical or organisational status: Synagogue
- Status: Active

Location
- Location: Old City of Jerusalem
- Interactive map of Istanbuli Synagogue

Architecture
- Completed: 1754

Eliahu Ha'navi Synagogue
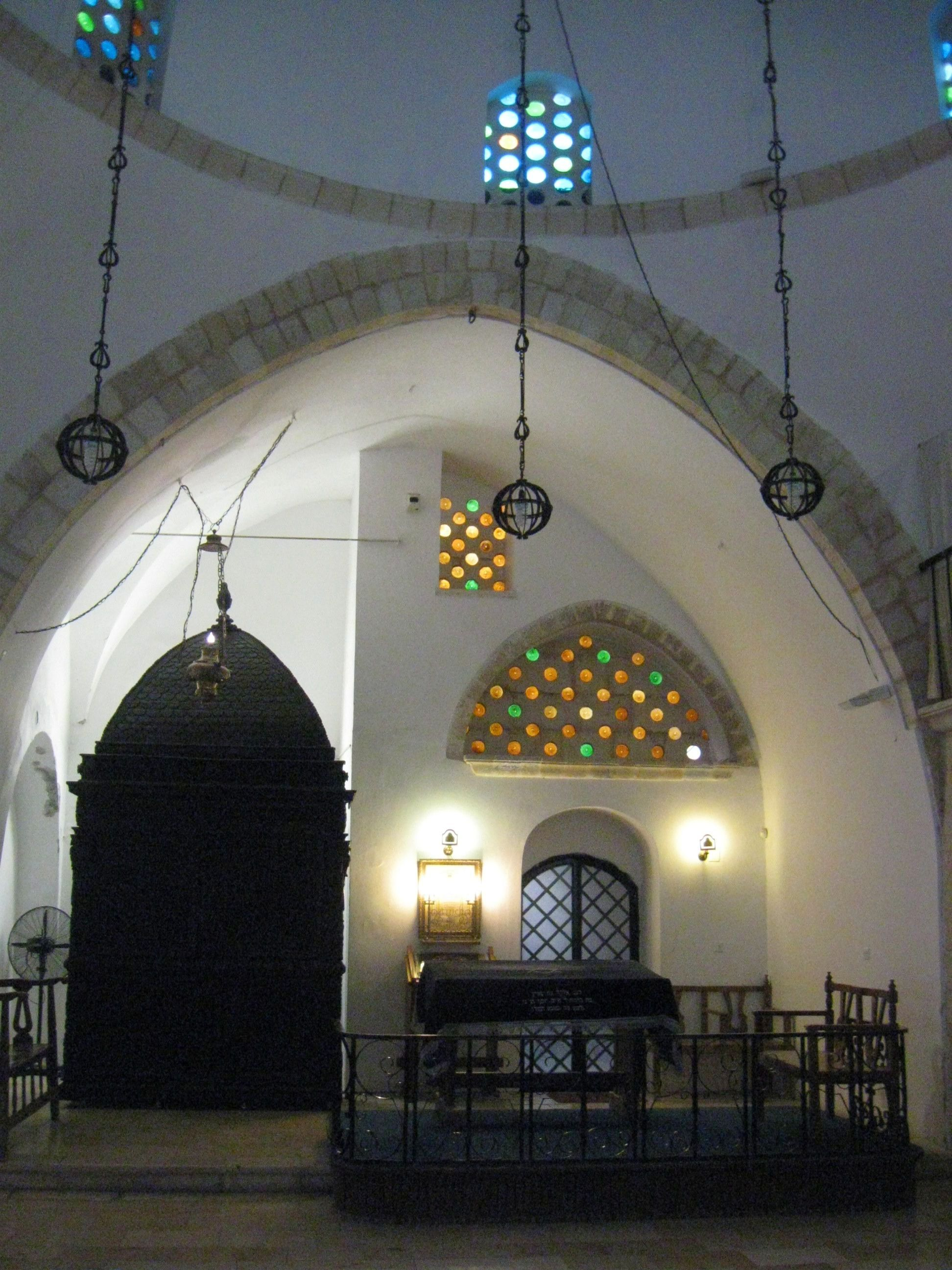
- The synagogue in 2013

Religion
- Affiliation: Judaism
- Ecclesiastical or organisational status: Synagogue
- Status: Active

Location
- Location: Old City of Jerusalem
- Interactive map of Eliahu Ha'navi Synagogue

Architecture
- Completed: 1586 CE

Emtsai Synagogue
- Hebrew: בית הכנסת האמצעי
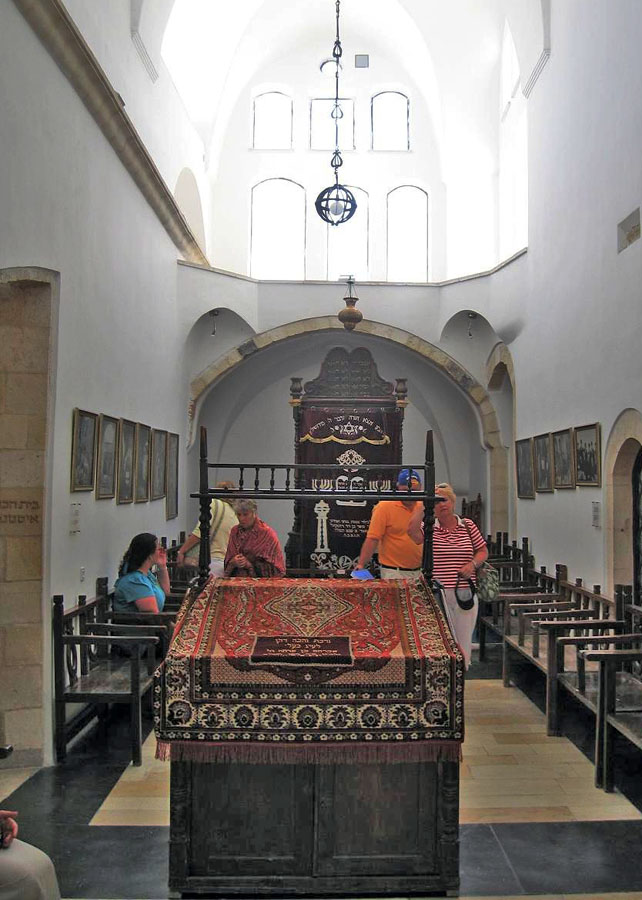
- The synagogue, in 2007

Religion
- Affiliation: Judaism
- Ecclesiastical or organisational status: Synagogue
- Status: Active

Location
- Location: Old City of Jerusalem
- Interactive map of Emtsai Synagogue

Architecture
- Completed: c. 18th century

=== Yochanan ben Zakai Synagogue ===
According to legend, the Yochanan ben Zakai Synagogue (Hebrew: בית הכנסת יוחנן בן זכאי), also known as Kahal Kadosh Gadol, is believed to stand on the spot of the Beit Midrash of the tanna Rabban Yochanan ben Zakai, who established the Sanhedrin in Yavneh after the destruction of the Second Temple. The current building was constructed at the beginning of the 17th century, and by 1947, it was the largest synagogue of the Sephardic community in Jerusalem. Since the end of the 19th century, it has served as the site of the Sephardic Chief Rabbi's installation.

A piece of land below street level was chosen for the synagogue in order to conceal the building from the authorities. Meir Ben Dov, however, is of the opinion that the sub-street level plot wasn't intentionally chosen, but rather that the street level itself was lower at the time and the synagogue had protruded above the street. With time the dwellings surrounding the synagogue were demolished and new houses were built above them, while the synagogue itself was preserved. This cycle continued until today, resulting in the synagogue being situated below street level. It should nevertheless be noted that if construction was indeed permitted, the building itself had to comply with Muslim restrictions for dhimmi houses of prayer not to be higher than mosques. Located in the old Jewish Quarter of Jerusalem, it suffered the same fate as most of the synagogues in the area during the 19 year Jordanian rule after 1948. It has been fully refurbished since Israel gained control of the Old City during the Six-Day War. This work was initiated by Rabbi Meir Yehuda Getz, Rabbi of the Western Wall, who also restored the Yeshivat haMekubalim to its former glory.

Unlike most synagogues, the Yochanan Ben Zakai Synagogue contains two Holy Arks - one for the Torah scrolls and one for other holy books. Other unique features include the oil jar and Shofar that are kept on a glass shelf by the southern wall's window. Tradition held that these were ancient relicts of the Temple, which could only be used to herald the arrival of the Messiah and in his subsequent anointing ceremony, while a 19th century account by Abraham Moses Luncz implies that the oil jug's importance was connected to the ritual of Shituf Mevo'ot. The original relics disappeared following the destruction of the synagogue in 1948 and were replaced with the modern iterations seen today.

=== Istanbuli Synagogue ===
The Istanbuli Synagogue (Hebrew: בית הכנסת האיסטנבולי) was formed from 1764, as the Sephardic community of Jerusalem grew due to large groups of immigrants who arrived from Istanbul, Turkey. They used the adjacent building as a synagogue and attracted worshipers from the Eastern communities, including Kurdistan and from North and West Africa.

The Hekhal dates from the seventeenth century and was imported from a synagogue which had been destroyed in Ancona, Italy. The Teba, constructed in the eighteenth century, came from a synagogue in Pesaro, Italy. The synagogue was renovated in 1836.

During the 1947–1949 Palestine war, the synagogue was occupied by Arabs. After Israel gained control of the Old City during the Six-Day War, it was renovated.

Today, the Istanbuli Synagogue is used by a Spanish and Portuguese congregation following mostly the London rite, established in 1980 as Congregation Shaare Ratzon.

A description of the synagogue was published in 1947 as follows:

Qahal Stāmbūlī (Hebrew: קהל סטאמבולי)(Istanbuli Congregation). This synagogue is immense, but is not distinguished for its beauty. Therein is had a cistern of water and a place of genizah, a repository for worn-out books until such time that they are taken out for burial. In its eastern façade there is an entrance by which they ascend to the street. On Sabbath days in the afternoon, a savant who regularly instructs there expounds [on the Torah] in the colloquial Spanish tongue (Ladino), a lesson that is derived from the weekly biblical lection (parsha) before the multitude of the people, as also [before] the women in the women's court. In all of the synagogues of the Spaniards there are wide benches that are situated only around the [interior] walls and joining the raised platform (dais), and [strewn] over them (i.e. the floor) are mats so as to permit sitting, their legs being beneath their knees, as the manner of the people of the Orient. The precentor stands upon the raised platform (bīmah) and prays while the congregants surround him. In each one of these synagogues there are many Torah scrolls fixed within wooden cases that are fabulously decorated. During the reading, they open the scroll while it stands in an upright position and read in it. There are also crowns and beautiful finials (rīmonīm), and expensive silk curtains that have been embroidered in gold. The women's court in each of these synagogues is located on the inside of the synagogue, [on an upper storey] close to the ceiling, enclosed by a wooden lattice partition, having a separate entrance from the street or from the courtyard.

=== Eliahu Ha'navi Synagogue ===
Another synagogue was established in anno 1586 CE and named after Elijah the Prophet. This synagogue is the oldest of the four. The Eliyahu Ha'navi Synagogue mainly served as a beth midrash for Torah study. Also known as Kahal Talmud Torah, it was only used for prayer on festivals. According to legend, the name of the synagogue was given after an event that took place on Yom Kippur, when one person was missing to complete the minyan required for prayer. Out of nowhere, a man unknown to the worshippers appeared and the service was able to start. The man mysteriously disappeared after the Neilah prayer. The people were sure that the man was none other than Elijah the Prophet.

=== Emtsai Synagogue ===
The Emtsai Synagogue or Middle Synagogue (Hebrew: בית הכנסת האמצעי), also known as the Kahal Tzion Synagogue, forms the central chamber of the complex. It was originally a courtyard which was probably used as the women's section of the Rabban Yohanan Ben Zakai synagogue. During Sukkot, it could be converted into a sukkah for the worshippers. With the growth of the community, it was decided during the middle of the 18th century to roof the yard. It was turned into what is today known as the Middle Synagogue, due to its location in the "middle" of the other three synagogues.

== See also ==
- History of the Jews in Israel
- List of synagogues in Israel
- Synagogues of Jerusalem
