= Ramban Synagogue =

Orthodox synagogue in the Old City of Jerusalem

- Hebrew: בית כנסת הרמב״ן
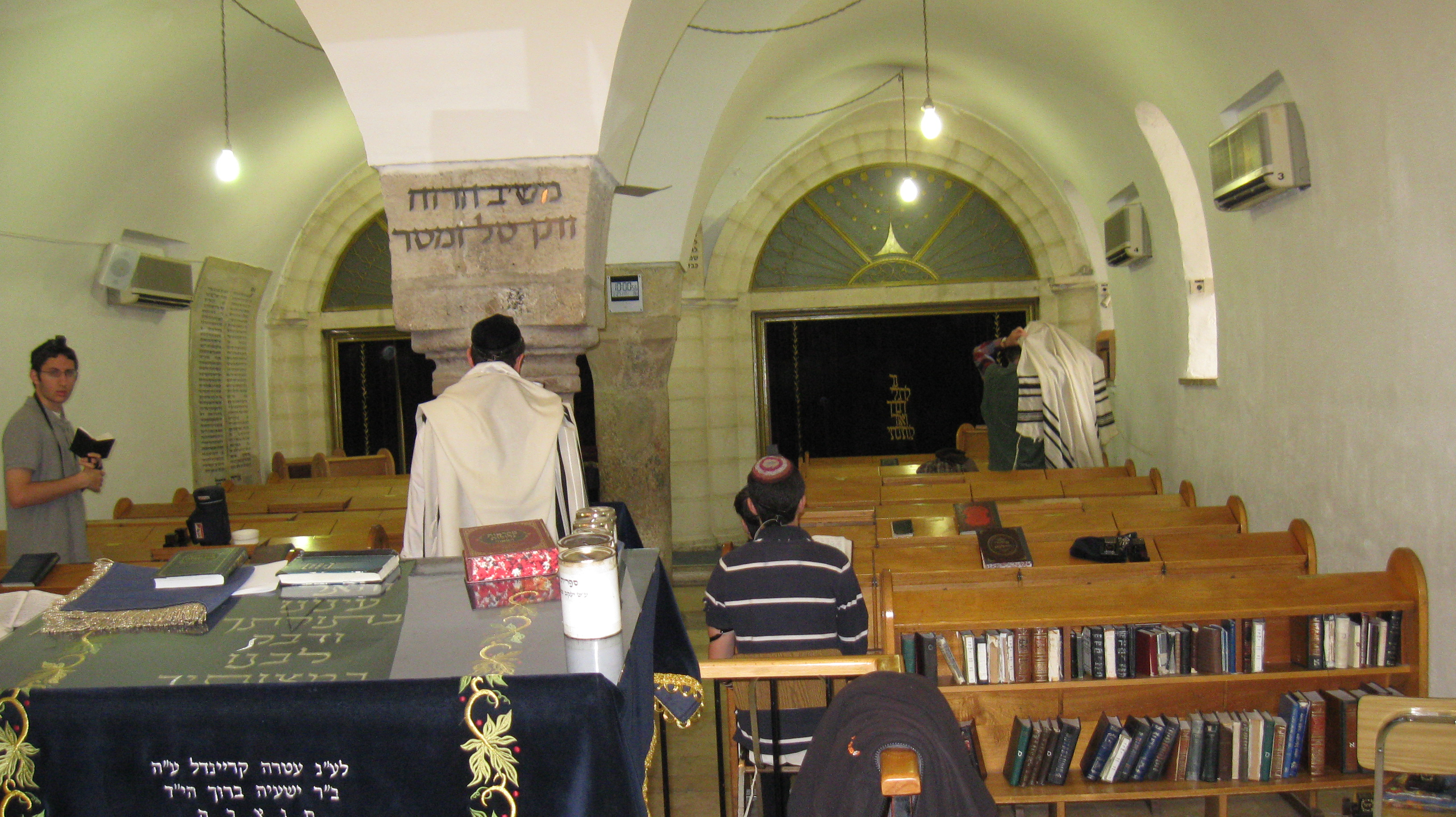
- The synagogue interior in 2006

- Location of the synagogue in Old Jerusalem

Religion
- Affiliation: Orthodox Judaism
- Rite: Nusach Ashkenaz
- Ecclesiastical or organizational status: Synagogue (c. 1400–1474); Synagogue (1475–16th century); Profane use (16th century–1948); Synagogue (since 1967)
- Leadership: Rabbi Avigdor Nebenzahl
- Year consecrated: c. 1400
- Status: Active

Location
- Location: Jewish Quarter Road (Ha-Yehudim Street), Jewish Quarter, Old City, Jerusalem
- Country: Israel/Palestine
- Interactive map of Ramban Synagogue
- Coordinates: 31°46′30.0″N 35°13′52.5″E

Architecture
- Founder: Rabbi Moshe ben Nachman
- Established: 1267 (as a congregation)
- Completed: c. 1400; 1475 (rebuilt); 1967 (rebuilt)
- Destroyed: 1474, 1948 and c. 1967

The Ramban Synagogue (Hebrew: בית כנסת הרמב״ן) is an Orthodox Jewish congregation and synagogue, located in the Jewish Quarter of the Old City of Jerusalem.

The synagogue building dates from c. 1400 and, after the Karaite Synagogue, it is the second oldest active synagogue in Jerusalem. Tradition holds that as an institution, it was founded by the scholar and Rabbi Moshe ben Nachman, also known as Nachmanides or Ramban, in 1267, but at a more southerly location on Mount Zion, to help rebuild the local Jewish community, that expanded because of the synagogue's presence.

The synagogue was moved to its current location in c. 1400, where it was destroyed in 1474, rebuilt in 1475, and continued functioning until being closed by the Muslim authorities in the late 16th century. The building was used for industrial and commercial purposes until its destruction in the 1948 Jordanian siege of the Jewish Quarter. After the Six-Day War in 1967, it was rebuilt over the old ruins and reconsecrated as a synagogue.

== Description ==
The foundation of the building comprises vaults resting on Romanesque and Byzantine capitals. Along with the fact that there are no Gothic or Islamic architectural features, this suggests that the original building predates the Crusader period.

The synagogue is located 3 m (9.8 ft) below street level, to comply with Muslim restrictions for Dhimmi houses of prayer not to be higher than mosques. The western entrance opens up to the Jewish Quarter Road and leads through the study hall or beit midrash to the main room, while the southern entrance can be reached from a staircase leading down from the Hurva Synagogue.

The synagogue's prayer hall has an elongated and slightly trapeze-like shape, that is 21.5 by 6.7 by 7.3 m (71 by 22 by 24 ft). Four columns, all in secondary use and with unadorned square capitals, are splitting the hall into two isles. The fifth one was removed and placed outside the southern entrance, in order to create space for the bimah, which takes a central position but never stood under a dome. The western end of the prayer hall has been extended in order to allow for a women's section, while the other, eastern end holds the Torah arks, one at the end of each isle.

== History ==
=== 13th/14th century synagogue ===
==== Tradition ====
Tradition has it that Nachmanides was the one who founded the synagogue.

After the Disputation of Barcelona, Nachmanides was exiled from Aragon, and in 1267 he made aliyah to the Land of Israel. In an alleged letter to his son, he described the Jewish community of Jerusalem devastated by the Khwarezmian "Tatars":

"Many are its forsaken places, and great is the desecration. The more sacred the place, the greater the devastation it has suffered. Jerusalem is the most desolate place of all. ... There are ten men who meet on the Sabbaths they hold services at their home. ... Even in its destruction, it is an exceedingly good land."

— Alleged letter by Nachmanides to his son

Seventy two years old, he undertook the effort to rebuild the Jewish community and chose a ruined house on Mount Zion to reconstruct it as a synagogue. A number of Jews moved to Jerusalem after hearing of Nachmanides' arrival. The Torah scrolls that were evacuated to Nablus (near biblical Shechem) before the Mongol invasion were returned. In three weeks, for Rosh Hashanah, the synagogue was ready for use.

==== Scholarly view ====
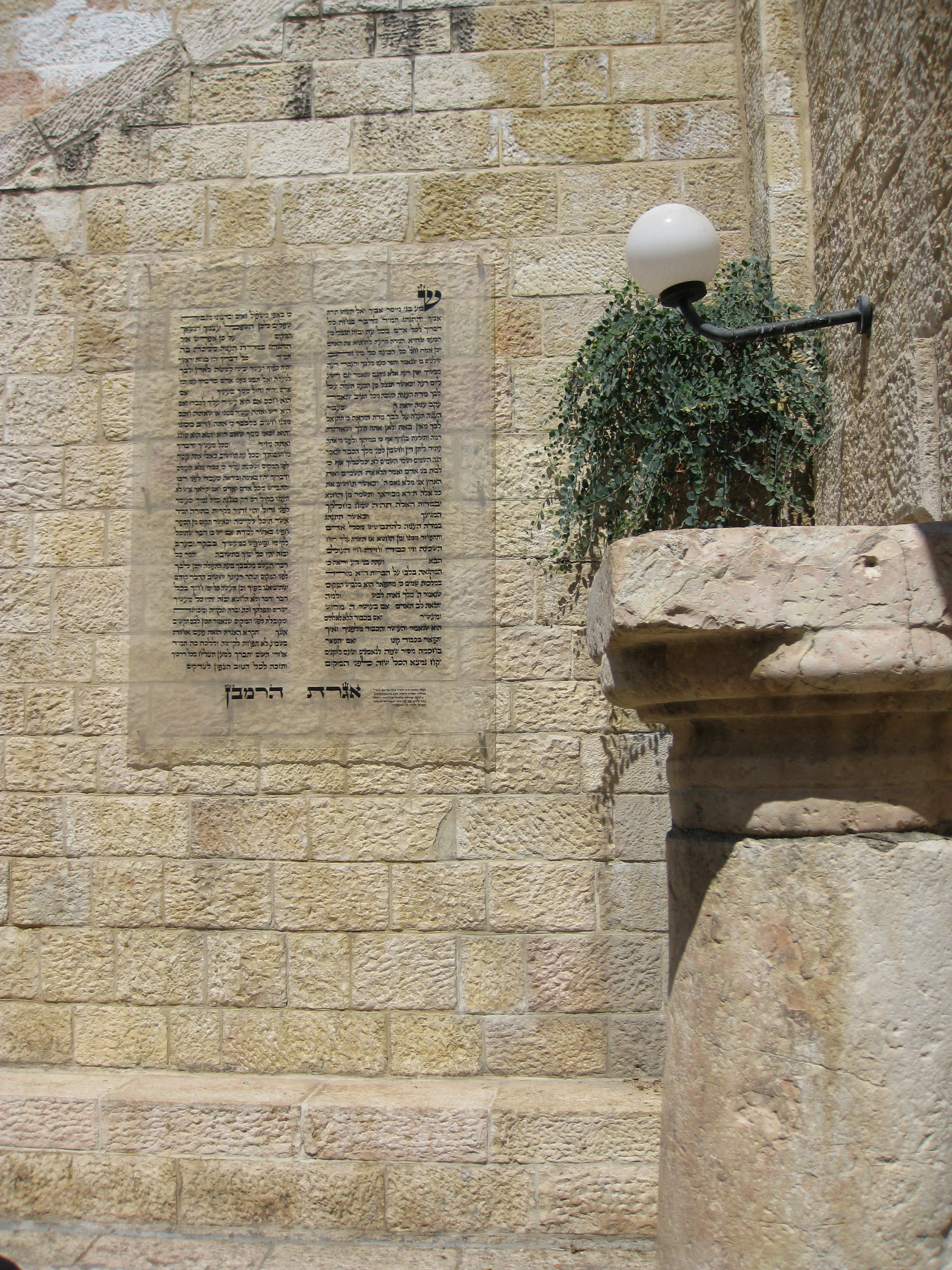
The letter of the Ramban, posted next to the entrance of the synagogue.

Norman Roth, a scholar specialised in medieval Jewish history, dates the establishment of the synagogue as an institution to the 13th century or "somewhat later", with Avraham David dating its establishment firmly at the beginning of the 15th century, but possibly referring to the building as such in its final location. Both agree that the tradition is at least problematic. The authenticity of Nachmanides' letter to his son, along with several other letters attributed to him, is contested. Many details in it are doubtful, starting with the questions on Nachmanides ever reaching Jerusalem, and continuing with doubts on the small number of Jews (just two) after Saladin's 1188 call to them to resettle Palestine, and on why a scholar of Nachmanides' rank would need to bring Torah scrolls from Nablus, the capital of the Samaritans, which Jews considered to be heretics. Obadiah Bertinoro, the next source on the synagogue, writes in 1488 about it without ever mentioning the name Ramban/Nachmanides in his description In the first half of the 16th century there are already signs of the fictitious connection with the Ramban being circulated.

=== 15th-16th century synagogue ===
According to Jewish educator Larry Domnitch, after a period of steady growth of the Jewish community, which was centered on the synagogue and yeshiva established by Nachmanides, around the year 1400 the synagogue was relocated further north, away from its initial location on Mount Zion.

A. David and others write that the synagogue established soon after 1400 was destroyed in 1474 by Muslim fanatics, then rebuilt in 1475. Ovadiah of Bertinoro, who arrives in Jerusalem in 1488, leaves a description of the synagogue, followed by one by Moses Bassola who visits in the early 1520s.

Traces of an erroneous attribution of the synagogue to Nachmanides can be already found in 1537.

In 1523, the synagogue was described as "the only Jewish place of worship in Jerusalem". (Note: A description of the rebuilt synagogue in 1523 refers to it as the only Jewish place of worship in Jerusalem.) In 1586 it was still used commonly by both the Sephardic and Ashkenazi communities.

=== Late 16th century: closure ===
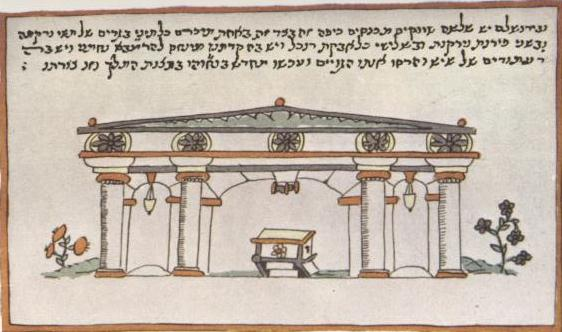
Shown in the Casale Pilgrim (16th-century)

In 1586, the synagogue was closed under the order of the Turkish governor of Jerusalem. Subsequently, the Sephardic community established their center in the adjacent place, where the academy belonging to the tanna Yochanan ben Zakai was said to have stood during the Second Temple period. Today the Yochanan ben Zakai Synagogue stands there.

The Nachmanides Synagogue shared a wall with the Sidna Umar Mosque and was described as similar in design. Ottoman authorities issued a firman to lock the synagogue door due to local complaints of 'noisy ceremonies' and further legal disputes were prohibited after the 1598 confiscation.

Joseph Schwarz wrote in 1845 how the medieval synagogue building and its later additions constituted the Jewish "court", a complex of buildings "constructed after the style of a monastery" and aligned from both sides along an inner space, a "large court, which forms as it were a whole street", the "Synagogue of the Ashkenazim" mentioned in the quote here-below. Schwarz further cites a 1628 document stating that the main building, the synagogue proper, was confiscated in 1588 by a particularly Jewish-hating mufti who dedicated it to "profane" purposes, and as such the building became known in Arabic as the "Al Maraga".

=== 17th to 19th century: industrial use ===
In 1845, Joseph Schwarz, considered by the Jewish Encyclopedia (1901-1906) as "the greatest Jewish authority on Palestinian matters since Estori Farḥi" proposed the identification of the modern synagogue – then known as "Al Maraga" in Arabic and previously at the centre of the "Synagogue of the Ashkenazim" compound – with the traditional Ramban Synagogue:

"Through perusal of documents and investigations made on the spot, I came upon the result, that this old building is the same Synagogue which was built in the year 5027 (1267), at the time of the celebrated Nachmanides (Ramban); since he says, in his letter to his son in Spain...: "We found a very handsome ruinous building with marble columns and a pretty cupola, and we made collections in order to restore the same to serve as a Synagogue, and commenced to build on it." This building, with a handsome cupola and marble columns, is still existing close by the present Synagogue; it was taken away from the Synagogue, as I shall tell hereafter, and is called at present Al Maraga, and is used as a raisin mill, in which raisins are crushed and ground in order to boil them into a syrup. At the time of the founding of this Synagogue it was limited to this single building; but at a later period, when the number of the Jews increased, all the houses contiguous to it were incorporated with it, and all denominated the Synagogue of the Ashkenazim. It was for a long time the only Synagogue in Jerusalem where divine worship was held. ... As late as about 5346 (1586), both congregations, the Sephardim and Ashkenazim united, worshipped there together; and only at the time when it was taken by violence from the congregation, and they were compelled to choose themselves another place in the court as a Synagogue, which has been preserved up to the latest period, the Sephardim separated from the Ashkenazim, the former probably restoring their ancient and former Zion Synagogue, since which time the other remained with the Ashkenazim, whence its name to the present day."

— Joseph Schwarz (1850), A Descriptive and Historical Sketch of Palestine

The 1628 text quoted by Schwarz also mentions a qadi who, during that very year, extorted a large amount of money, 1000 grosh, from the Jewish community in order to recognise their property rights and stop the transformation of "Al Maraga" into a raisin mill, and the construction of several shops "out of the hall and front of the Synagogue". In spite of the retroactive and valid property deed issued by the corrupt qadi, in Schwarz's own time were Al Maraga was indeed used as a raisin mill and the shops had been built "in the outer hall", "although they happen to be at present the property of the Jews."

In 1835, the community leaders managed to obtain permission from Ibrahim Pasha, the Egyptian conqueror and governor of the region of Syria, for the renovation of the synagogues, of which the Sephardic ones were unified into a single unit, known today as the Four Sephardic Synagogues. With the permission of his father, Muhammad Ali Pasha the ruler of Egypt, the complex known as the "Synagogue of the Ashkenazim" was returned to the Ashkenazi community in 1836, but without the actual main building, "Al Maraga", a goal seen by Schwarz as certain to attain, had it been not for the Ottomans regaining power over the territory from Muhammad Ali by 1841.

=== 20th century: destruction and reconsecration ===
The building was used as a cheese factory at an unspecified time.

N. Roth wrote in 2014 that the building was completely destroyed by the Jordanian Arab Legion in 1948, with nothing remaining except for plans and photos produced before the May–July 1948 Siege of Jerusalem.

The synagogue we see today has been built on the ruins of the one seen by Bertinoro and Bassola.

As a result of the 1967 Six-Day War, Jews regained access to the property, and a synagogue with a beit midrash, or Torah study hall, was opened there. Today it is used by the Ashkenazi community.

== Second Ramban Synagogue in Jerusalem ==
There is a second Ramban Synagogue in Jerusalem, established after 1948 and rebuilt in 2005, located at 4 Amatsya Street in the Katamon neighbourhood. It made the headlines in 2016, when Carmit Feintuch became its communal leader (alongside Rabbi Benny Lau), the first woman to be hired in this position at an Orthodox synagogue in Israel.

== See also ==
- Cave of the Ramban
- History of the Jews in Israel
- List of synagogues in Israel
- Oldest synagogues in the world
- Synagogues of Jerusalem
