= Italian Synagogue (Jerusalem) =

The Italian Synagogue and Museum in Jerusalem

Italian Synagogue, Jerusalem
- בית הכנסת האיטלקי, ירושלים
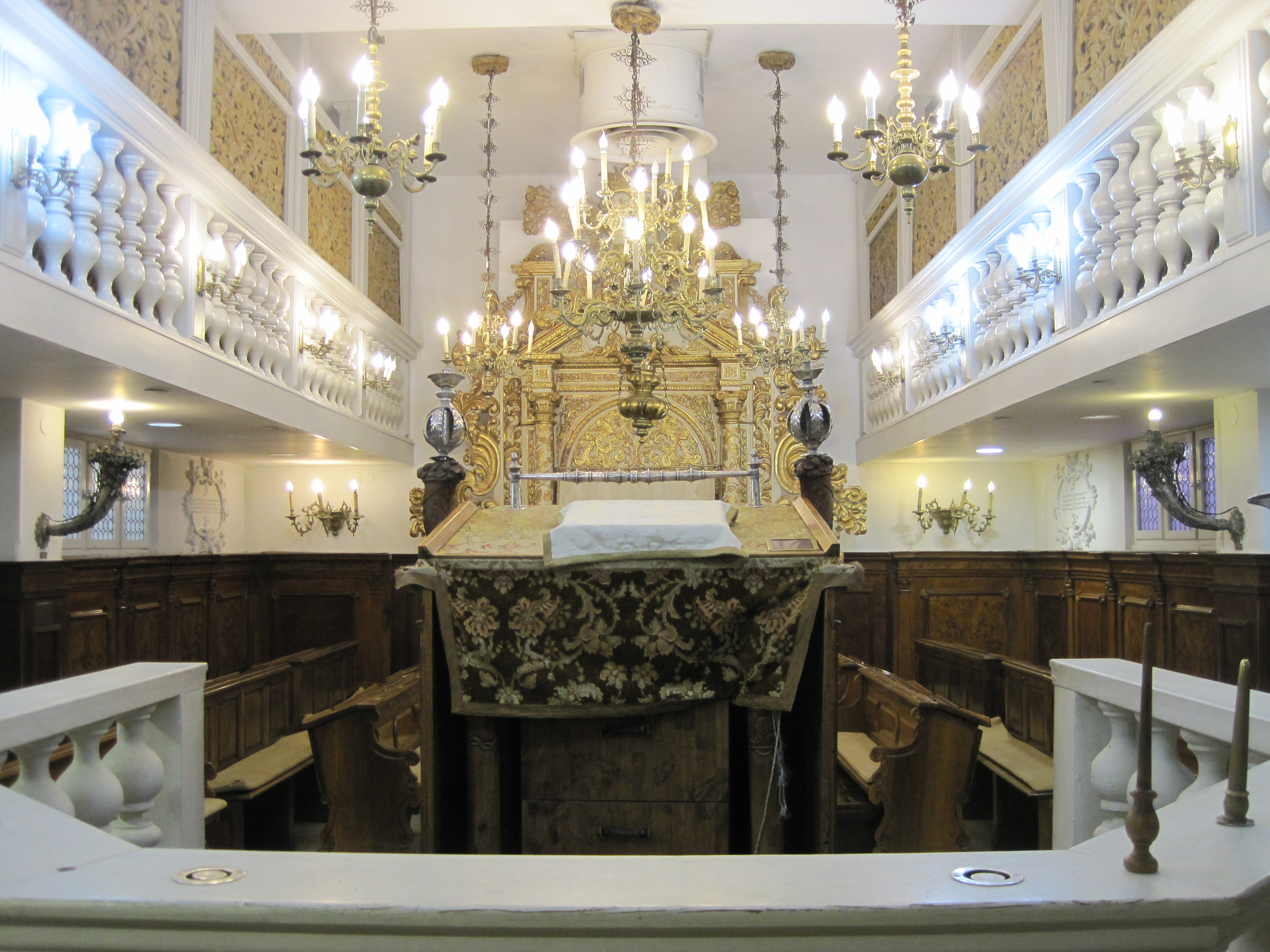

Religion
- Affiliation: Judaism (Italian rite)
- Rite: Minhag Italia

Location
- Location: 27 Hillel Street, Jerusalem, Israel
- Country: Israel
- Interactive map of Italian Synagogue, Jerusalem
- Coordinates: 31°46′37″N 35°13′21″E

Website
- ijamuseum.org

The Italian Synagogue of Jerusalem (Hebrew: בית הכנסת האיטלקי, ירושלים), also known as the Conegliano Veneto Synagogue, is a Rococo-style synagogue located at 27 Hillel Street in central Jerusalem. Originally built in 1701 in the Jewish ghetto of Conegliano in the Veneto region of northern Italy, its entire interior was dismantled and shipped to Israel in 1951 and formally dedicated in Jerusalem on 4 April 1952. The synagogue shares its building with the Umberto Nahon Museum of Italian Jewish Art, established in 1982.

Services and weekly Torah readings are conducted according to the Italian rite (Minhag Italia), one of the most ancient surviving Jewish liturgical traditions.

== History ==
=== In Italy ===
Jews first settled in Conegliano in 1397–98. By 1637 the community had been confined to a ghetto, within which they built a new synagogue in 1701. The last service held in Conegliano took place on Yom Kippur 1917 or 1918, when Austro-Hungarian Jewish soldiers sought a synagogue in which to observe the holiday; after this the building was abandoned.

In 1944, Alfonso Pacifici proposed moving the synagogue to Palestine. After World War II, the community of Conegliano decided to destroy the center of the town and all the buildings, including the synagogue and the Jewish area. Members of the Jewish community of Venice, who were in charge of the Conegliano synagogue, suggested that it be transferred to Jerusalem. In 1946, a formal suggestion to purchase it was submitted to the Union of Italian Jewish Communities, and on 7 October 1948 the Venetian Jewish community voted to donate the synagogue to the Association of Italian Jews and the Association of Italian Immigrants in Israel. The task of dismantling the Torah ark, the bimah, and all furnishings was entrusted to Federico Luzzatto, Guido Bassan and Angelo Fano of Kibbutz Givat Brenner.

=== In Israel ===
In April 1951 the ship Abazzia docked at Haifa Port with the synagogue's components. Craftsmen from Italy and Israel spent a year reconstructing the interior in Jerusalem. The dedication ceremony took place on 4 April 1952. Later that year a service was held to mark the completion of illuminated wall paintings by artist Miriam Bolaffio Morpurgo, and memorial plaques were unveiled for Dr Renato Jarach, Prof. Moshe David Cassuto, and community members who died in Israel's War of Independence.

The museum and synagogue are housed in a building constructed in the 1870s–80s by the German Catholic Society as a hospice near the Jaffa Gate—known as the Schmidt Compound. The Italian community was permitted to use it for prayer in the 1940s, and the reconstructed synagogue was installed on the building's second floor. In 2022 Italian Prime Minister Mario Draghi visited the synagogue, where he met representatives of the Italian community in Israel.

The Umberto Nahon Museum of Italian Jewish Art was established by the Jerusalem Italian Jews Association in the former Schmidt Compound in 1982. It collects, preserves, and displays objects pertaining to Jewish life in Italy from the Middle Ages to the present, focusing on the Renaissance and Baroque periods. The museum also houses conservation workshops, a library, and a photograph collection. Notable holdings include what is believed to be the world's oldest surviving Torah curtain (parochet), dating to 1572.

== See also ==
- Synagogues of Jerusalem
- History of the Jews in Israel
