= Synagogue of Pesaro =

Synagogue in Pesaro

- Sinagoga di Pesaro
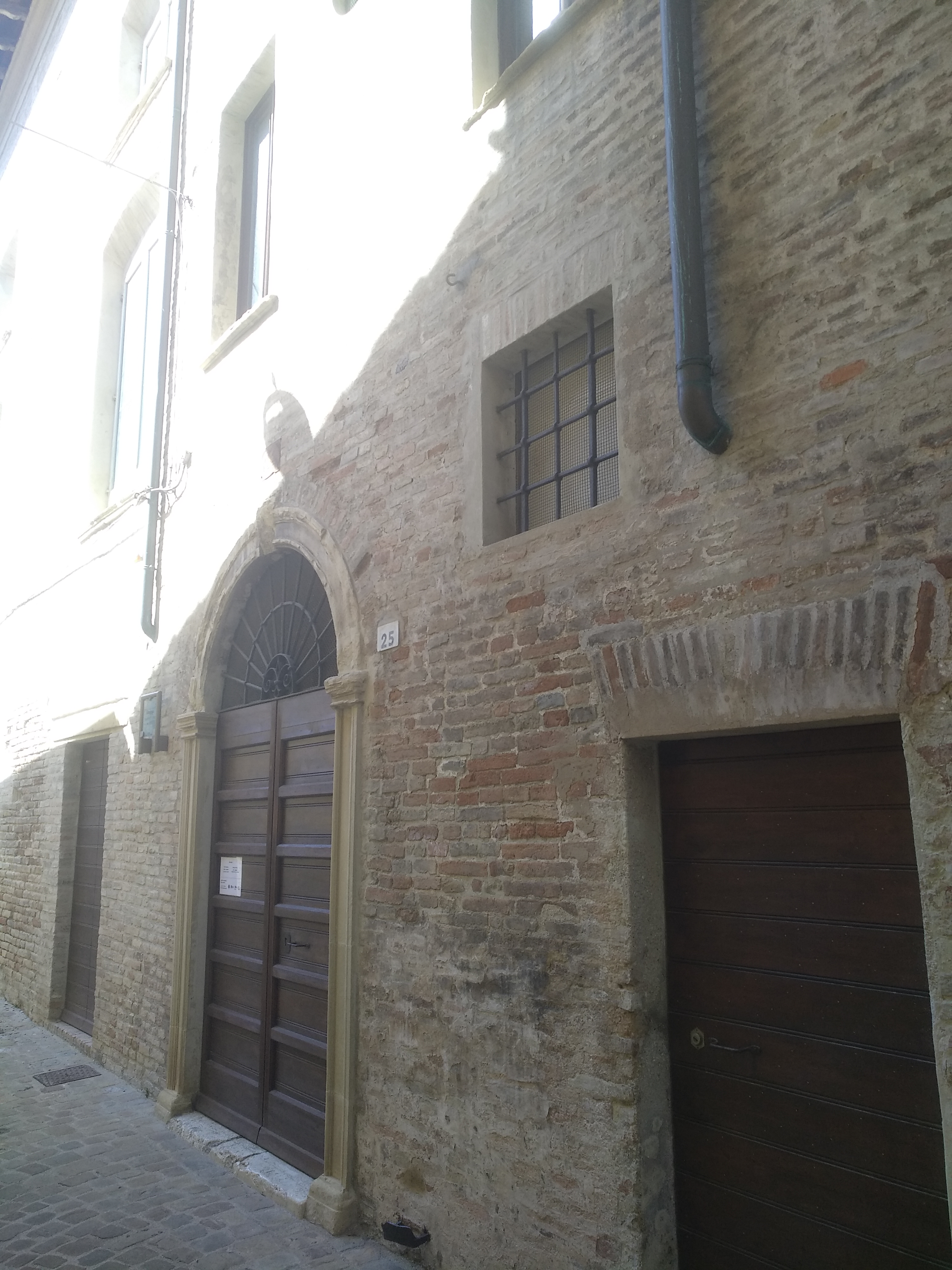
- Exterior of synagogue

Religion
- Affiliation: Judaism
- Rite: Spanish rite

Location
- Location: Via delle Scuole 23, Pesaro, Italy
- Interactive map of Synagogue of Pesaro
- Coordinates: 43°54′44″N 12°54′43″E

Architecture
- Style: Baroque
- Established: 1642

The Synagogue of Pesaro (Italian: Sinagoga di Pesaro) is a Jewish synagogue in Pesaro, Italy. It is currently preserved as a building, but inactive as a congregation. Its interior is considered one of the most beautiful and refined examples of architecture for Jewish worship in Italy.

== History ==
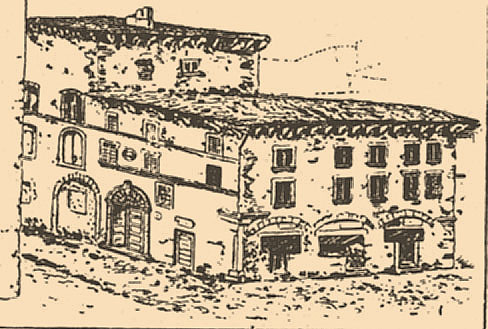
Illustration of building from the Brockhaus and Efron Encyclopedic Dictionary

The Jewish ghetto in Pesaro was established in 1632, and two synagogues were founded in local buildings. One was Italian rite, and was demolished in 1957 as a result of damage sustained from the 1930 Senigallia earthquake. The other was of Spanish rite and is still intact. One additional Italian synagogue existed, which was built in 1367 and out of use early on, despite continued taxes held to the community for it. At one point, all congregations were using the Spanish rite synagogue, which was built in 1642.

At some point in the 18th or 19th century, the Torah ark became too small to hold all the scrolls of the congregation, so a larger one was put in its place, and the original was moved to the women's section to be protected and preserved.

The Jewish community significantly declined in the 20th century due to the Holocaust and emigration to other cities. Its period of abandonment led to the loss of some of its original furnishings. The gilded wooden Torah ark of 1708, created by cabinetmaker Angelo Scoccianti di Cupramontana, was moved to the Synagogue of Livorno in 1970. The balcony of the bema is located in the Twin synagogues of Ancona, and the original grates of the women's gallery were moved to Talpiot.

Since 1999, the synagogue has been managed by the Jewish community of Ancona, who was granted the synagogue on loan under the Pesaro municipal government. Since 2003, the city has done major restoration work on the building that has touched on the decorations, the paintings, the furnishings, and the interior.

=== Italian synagogue ===
The Torah ark of the Italian rite synagogue, which dates to 1646, was not transferred to the surviving Spanish congregation, but was instead brought to Jerusalem and may be currently located at the Central Synagogue of Kiryat Sanz, Netanya. Its original curtain, which survives with it, was embroidered in 1620 or 1630 by Rachel Olivetti Montefiore to honor her husband, Yehuda Montefiore. It was red silk with silver and gold embroidery. Two busts of lions were placed at the foot of the ark during its original period of usage, transferred from a synagogue in Ascoli. It was a somewhat controversial practice at the time, but was well-received in the community. Many responsa were written about their Kedushah.

== Description ==
Two entrances exist, including a larger one for men (a stone door rebuilt in the 19th century) and a smaller one for women that directly accesses the women's section through a staircase. The ground floor contains a room with a matzah oven, a room with a mikveh, and a room for ritual washing.

The synagogue maintains its original structure and has many 17th-century decorations and original furnishings. It has a large and bright rectangular room on the first floor, which is the shul with a high vaulted ceiling. The ceiling is ornamented with white and blue stucco rosettes interspersed with other floral designs.

The Torah ark and the bema face each other one the narrower walls of the building, and the tabernacle of the ark is framed by two columns and windows. The wall opposite of the bema forms a raised gallery for the chazzan and the chorus. The gallery sides host two large 19th-century tempera paintings, depicting the Jews at the foot of Mount Sinai and one which contains an allegory of the city of Jerusalem, depicted as a woman in a rural landscape.

The four walls have high wooden cladding and rows of pews that double on the longer sides of the room. The second row of pews were provided from the Italian rite synagogue that was destroyed. The left side of the ark overlooks the windows of the women's gallery, which was originally closed by wooden grilles inlaid with small Stars of David.

== See also ==
- List of synagogues in Italy
