= Beauty (Selbourne novel) =

2009 novel by Raphael Selbourne

- First edition (publ. Tindal Street Press)
- Author: Raphael Selbourne
- Language: English
- Publisher: Tindal Street Press
- Publication date: 2009

Beauty is a 2009 novel by Raphael Selbourne about a young Muslim woman – the eponymous heroine – in search of personal freedom. Beauty was awarded the 2009 Costa First Novel Award.

== Plot summary ==
Set in Wolverhampton, England, Beauty relays the tribulations of ten days in the life of Beauty Begum, a nineteen-year-old Muslim Bengali woman who has survived a substantial degree of physical and emotional harm from her family. As a consequence of the fact that the novel is told using an oscillating narrator, the reader has the benefit of 'hearing' the thoughts of the main characters.

At the beginning of the novel, Beauty is again living with her family after having returned from Bangladesh, where she was supposed to be the wife of a mullah more than twice her age, an arranged marriage that has not worked out due to Beauty's opposition. Having preserved her virginity, and having been pronounced dumb and insane by her family, she now realizes that she is again being singled out to marry someone for whom she does not care. The first few chapters provide an account of her unhappy life, having to provide meals for the rest of the family according to precise specifications, being verbally and physically abused by family members and only being allowed out of the home to attend English classes.

Her one act of rebellion – her leaving home before it is too late – causes her first encounter with the world of "white people." She meets Mark Aston, a young ex-con who is trying hard to stay on the right path as well as Peter Hemmings, his middle-class neighbour. Peter has been unable to commit himself to his relationship with Kate Morgan, a career woman whose sophisticated feminist demands have alienated her from him. Beauty also meets a group of elderly residents of an old people's home where she finds work.

Although she is appalled at many aspects of white people's lives, Beauty realizes that she can also benefit from her interactions with them. Mark's attempts at teaching the illiterate young woman to read as well as Peter's lecturing her on Western thought, in particular atheism and Darwinism, help her gain some practical knowledge and skills but also reconsider her own prejudices and strengthen her own faith. At the same time, Beauty is exposed to the bureaucracy of the welfare state and the futility of its endeavours to help those in need.

Beauty, who has avoided both Mark's and Peter's advances, has to choose between her family duty and own freedom.

== Reviews and background material ==
- William Palmer: "Beauty, By Raphael Selbourne", The Independent (10 September 2009).
- Lorne Jackson: "Raphael Selbourne Shines a Light on Hidden World in Beauty", Birmingham Post (15 January 2010).
- Interview with the Costa Award winning novelist Raphael Selbourne, The Times (7 January 2010).

== Edition ==
- Raphael Selbourne: Beauty (Tindal Street Press: Birmingham, 2009) (ISBN 9780955647673).
