= Synagogues of Jerusalem =

Jewish congregational temples in Jerusalem

This article deals in more detail with some of the notable synagogues of Jerusalem.

== Former synagogues ==
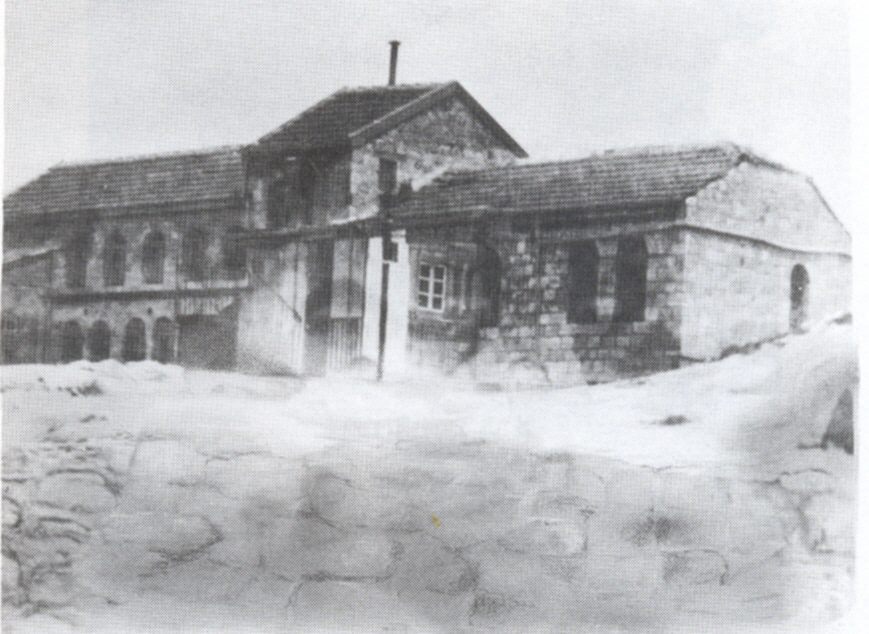
Beis Aharon, c.1930

- Beis Aharon Synagogue of Karlin-Stolin. In around 1870 the first Karlin-Stolin Hasidim settled in Jerusalem and by 1874 had established their own synagogue in the Old City. It was named Beis Aharon (House of Aaron) after a work authored by Rabbi Aharon II Perlow of Karlin (1802–1872). After it was destroyed during the 1948 Arab–Israeli War, a new centre was established in Jerusalem's Beis Yisrael neighbourhood.
- Beit Meir and Ohel Yitzhak Synagogue. Located in the Batei Mahse complex and inaugurated in 1881, it served as a synagogue for the community of German immigrants in the Jewish Quarter. It was named after Rabbi Meir ben Yitzhak Frenkel Eiseman, Rabbi in Weitzenhausen. In 1948, after the conquest of the Jewish Quarter by the Jordanian Legion, the Arabs completedly destroyed the synagogue. Today, there are no remnants of the synagogue, nor is there any known photograph of its interior. Unlike other synagogues in the Old City destroyed during the War of Independence and rebuilt after the liberation of Jerusalem, such as the Hurva or Ohel Yitzhak, there have been no plans to rebuild the Beit Meir
- Chesed El Synagogue, a synagogue located on Chabad Street in the Jewish Quarter of the Old City of Jerusalem. It was established by immigrants from Iraq in 1853 and served as a centre for Jews of Iraqi descent living in Jerusalem. It also served as a yeshiva for kabbalists and had a famous library of Kabbalistic works. The synagogue was active until the fall of the Jewish Quarter during the 1948 Arab–Israeli War when it was taken over by an Arab family. After the Six-Day War the building became the centre of Bnei Akiva and didn't revert to use as a synagogue.
- Tiferet Yisrael Synagogue has been destroyed in 1948, but, as of 2025, is in the process of being rebuilt, much like the Hurva Synagogue.
- Yanina Synagogue, a Romaniote synagogue established by the Jews of Ioannina, Greece. It was located in the Christian Quarter of the Old City of Jerusalem. The community also has a synagogue in the "new city", located in the Ohel Moshe neighborhood of Nahlaot.

== Active synagogues ==
=== Karaite Synagogues ===
Name	Location	Additional Information	Image
Karaite Synagogue	Old City of Jerusalem, Jewish Quarter	founded by Anan Ben David, the founder of the Karaites, is the oldest synagogue in the Jewish Quarter	The Karaite Synagogue in the Old City (Jerusalem)

=== Orthodox Synagogues ===
Name	Location	Additional Information
Ari Synagogue	Old City of Jerusalem, Armenian Quarter	
Ohr ha-Chaim Synagogue	Old City of Jerusalem, Armenian Quarter	
Beit El Synagogues	Old City of Jerusalem, Jewish Quarter and Ruhama neighbourhood	Two synagogues with this name operate in Jerusalem, along with the Yeshivat HaMekubalim school of Kabbalah. One is located in the Jewish Quarter, the other one, continuing the same pre-1948 tradition and functioning under the same name (Beit El Synagogue and Yeshivat HaMekubalim), was built in West Jerusalem in 1974
The Four Sephardic Synagogues	Old City of Jerusalem, Jewish Quarter	A complex consisting of four different institutions: Rabban Yochanan ben Zakai Synagogue and Kahal Kadosh Gadol; Istanbuli Synagogue; Eliahu Ha'navi Synagogue, aka Kahal Talmud Torah; Emtsai or Middle Synagogue, aka Kahal Tzion Synagogue
Hsidi Brsilv Synagogue	Old City of Jerusalem, Jewish Quarter	A Breslov synagogue founded in 1860
Hurva Synagogue	Old City of Jerusalem, Jewish Quarter	(English: Ruined Synagogue) is the currently largest synagogue in the Jewish Quarter. It was originally intended for construction in the 18th century. A small building was constructed, but due to financial difficulties, the intended larger building was not completed. The building was destroyed by an earthquake, and a second attempt to build a large synagogue was blocked by Arab landowners in the early 19th century failed. In the 1830s, multiple small synagogues were built around the site. In the 1860s, the large synagogue was completed. It was destroyed by the Jordanians following the 1947–1949 Palestine war. The synagogue was rebuilt in 2010 and is a distinguished feature of Jerusalem's Old City skyline.
Menachem Zion Synagogue	Old City of Jerusalem, Jewish Quarter	Completed in 1837. Built by the Perushim, it was named after their leader Rabbi Menachem Mendel of Shklov and after the blessing of consolation recited on Tisha B'Av: "Blessed be He who consoles (menachem) Zion and rebuilds Jerusalem." Rabbi Daniel Sperber leads the congregation.
Ramban Synagogue	Old City of Jerusalem, Jewish Quarter	The oldest Rabbinic synagogue of the Jewish Quarter.
Sukkat Shalom Synagogue	Old City of Jerusalem, Jewish Quarter	Founded in 1836 by the Perushim of Kollel Hod (HollandDeutschland), in "The Chush" or "the Hush" (חצר החוש), compound of residential courtyards dating from the early 1800s.
Tzemach Tzedek Synagogue	Old City of Jerusalem, Jewish Quarter	A Chabad synagogue founded in 1879.
Tzuf Dvash Synagogue	Old City of Jerusalem, Jewish Quarter	A Sephardic synagogue which was founded in 1860.
Western Wall	Old City of Jerusalem, Jewish Quarter	The holiest Jewish site alongside the Temple Mount, functions as a synagogue including the area beneath Wilson's Arch.
Excellent Zion Synagogue	Old City of Jerusalem, Muslim Quarter	
Hzon Yehezkel Synagogue	Old City of Jerusalem, Muslim Quarter	
Igud Lohamay Jerushalaim Ateret Cohanim	Old City of Jerusalem, Muslim Quarter	
Ohel Yitzchak Synagogue,	Old City of Jerusalem, Muslim Quarter	Formerly known as Shomrei HaChomos Synagogue or Ungarin Shul (Hungarian synagogue)
Ades Synagogue	Nachlaot neighborhood	Known as the Great Synagogue Ades of the Glorious Aleppo Community, was established by Syrian immigrants in 1901
Baka Chabad Center for the English Speaking	Baka neighborhood	
Beis Hamedrash Gur	Geula neighborhood	
Beit Knesset Tzameret Arnona	Arnona neighborhood	
Belz Great Synagogue	Kiryat Belz neighbourhood	
Chanichei Yeshivos,	Romema	
David's Tomb	Mount Zion	Located just outside the Old City walls
Great Synagogue	King George Street	
Great Sephardic Synagogue	Yemin Moshe neighborhood	
HaNassi Synagogue	Rehavia	Located alongside, and named for, the residence of the President of Israel
Hecht Synagogue	Hebrew University, Mount Scopus Campus	
HaTzvi Yisrael Synagogue	Talbieh	
Heichal Shlomo	King George Street	Includes the Renanim Synagogue transferred from Padua
Israel Goldstein Synagogue	Hebrew University, Givat Ram campus	
Italian Synagogue (Jerusalem)	Hillel Street	
Kehilas Bnei Torah	Har Nof	
Ohavei Zion Synagogue	Nachlaot	The synagogue was established by Persian immigrants from Shiraz in 1906.
Ohel Moshe Synagogue	Ohel Moshe neighborhood	Sephardi synagogue established in 1883, part of Nachlaot
Or Zaruaa Synagogue, Jerusalem, Israel	Nahlat Ahim neighbourhood	Part of Nachlaot
Shai Agnon Synagogue	Talpiot	The full official Hebrew name is Beth Midrash "Tiferet Yisrael" al Shem Shai Agnon", lit. "House of Learning 'Glory of Israel' in the name of S. Y. Agnon". The Talpiot neighborhood in Jerusalem was established immediately after World War I. Its planners' intention was to make it into the capital city of the nascent State of Israel. The first synagogue in the neighbourhood was in a hut, which was established to serve as a structure for the builders of the neighbourhood and after the completion of the construction was converted into a mixed Ashkenazi and Sephardic synagogue. Among the first worshipers of the minyan in the hut was the writer Shmuel Yosef Agnon, who lived in the neighbourhood. He described the hut and how the prayer was conducted in it in the short story "The Symbol" (The Fire and the Trees), Tel Aviv Press 1961. The cornerstone of the current building was laid in Chanukah 1934, in the presence of Rabbi Avraham Yitzhak HaCohen Kook. With the outbreak of the 1936–1939 riots, the construction of the synagogue was delayed and the structure remained neglected. After the outbreak of World War II in 1939 the British confiscated the building and established in it a police station and a warehouse. After the establishment of the State of Israel in 1948, during the period when Talpiot was a transit camp (ma'abara), the State used the building as a warehouse of equipment for the transit camp. In the 1950s the building was leased to the Hebrew University and served as a warehouse of its medical school. In the late 1960s the building returned to the Jerusalem municipality, who renovated the building with the assistance of the Jerusalem Foundation and with a contribution received from author S. Y. Agnon, a resident of the neighbourhood, out of the money he received for the Nobel Prize. In the month of Elul 5772 (1972) the synagogue was again inaugurated in a procession where the Torah scrolls from the hut were brought in.
Shir Hadash	Talbiya and German Colony	A multi-site Synagogue founded by Rabbi Ian (Haim) Pear.
Zoharei Chama Synagogue	Jaffa Road	
Yad Tamar Synagogue	Rehavia	
Yakar Synagogue	Old Katamon neighborhood	Includes the Yakar Center for Social Concern and the Center for Arts and Creativity—Anglo and Israeli congregation
Yeshurun Synagogue	King George Street, Rehavia	

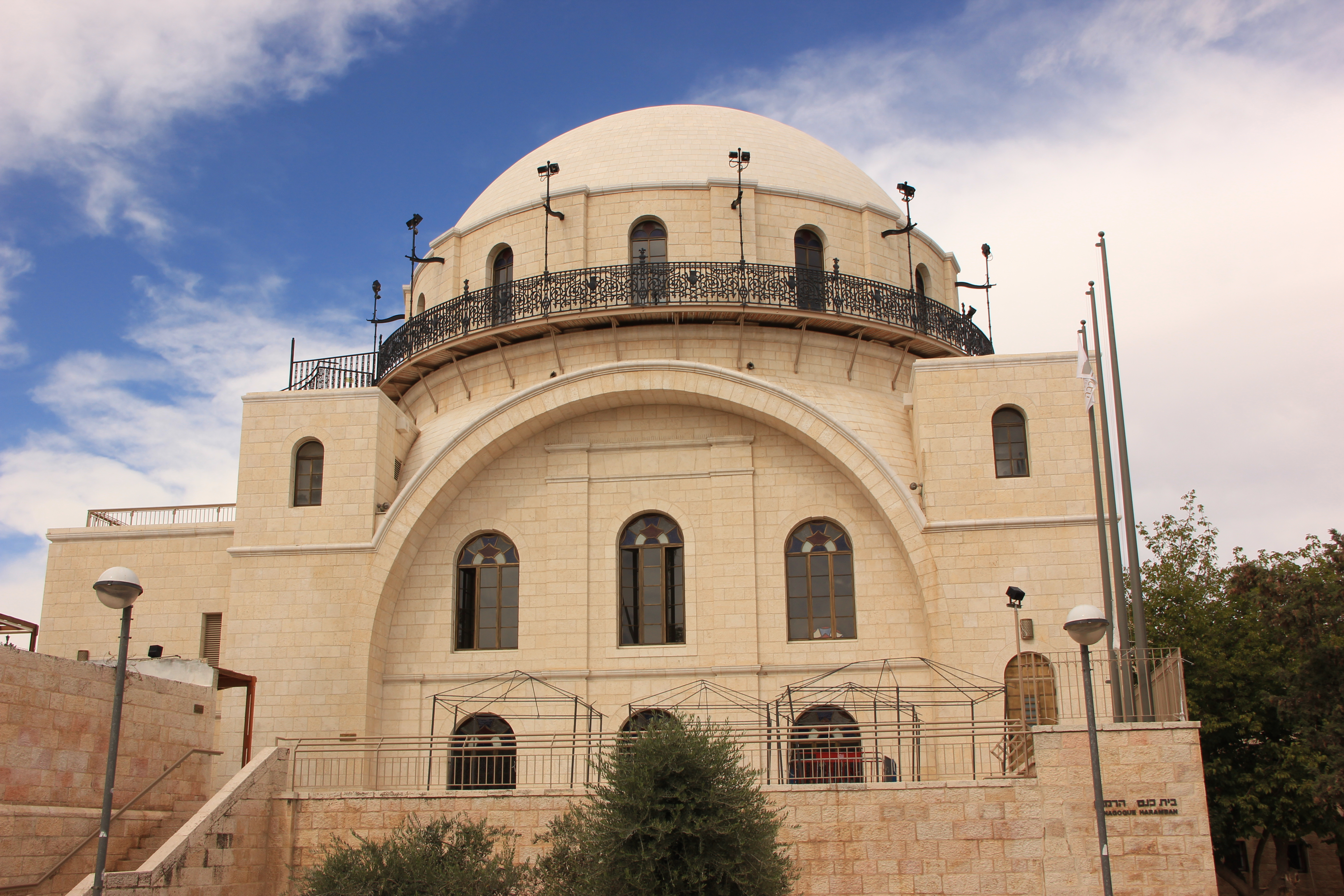
Hurva Synagogue

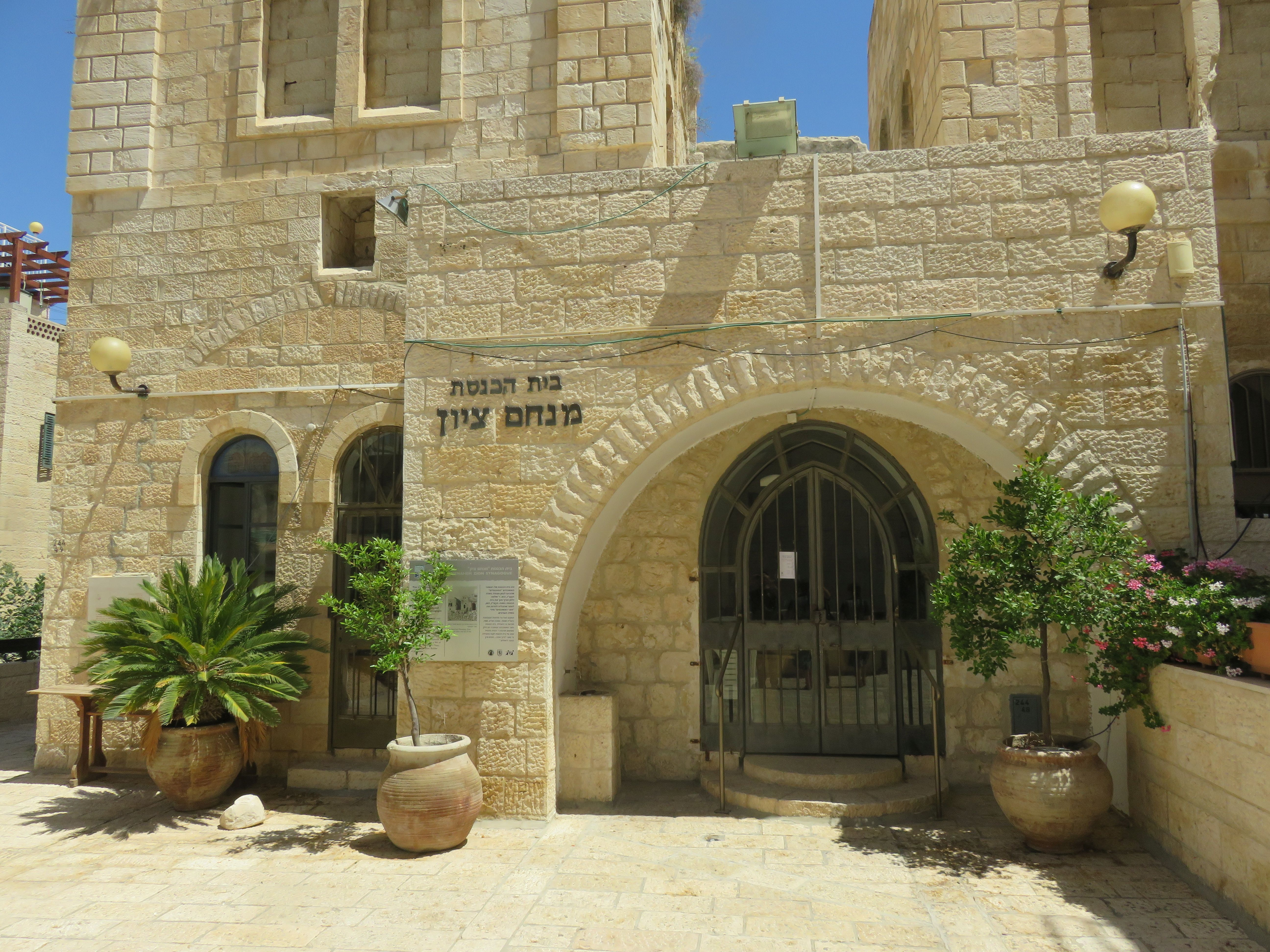
Menachem Zion Synagogue

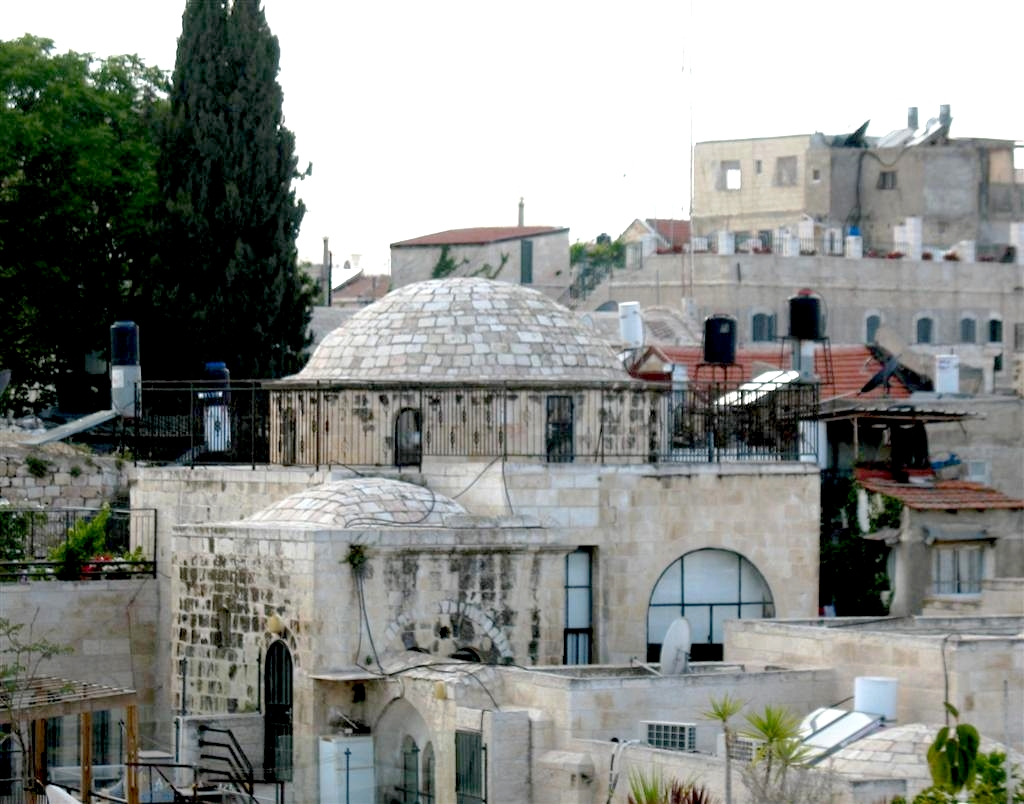
Sukkat Shalom Synagogue

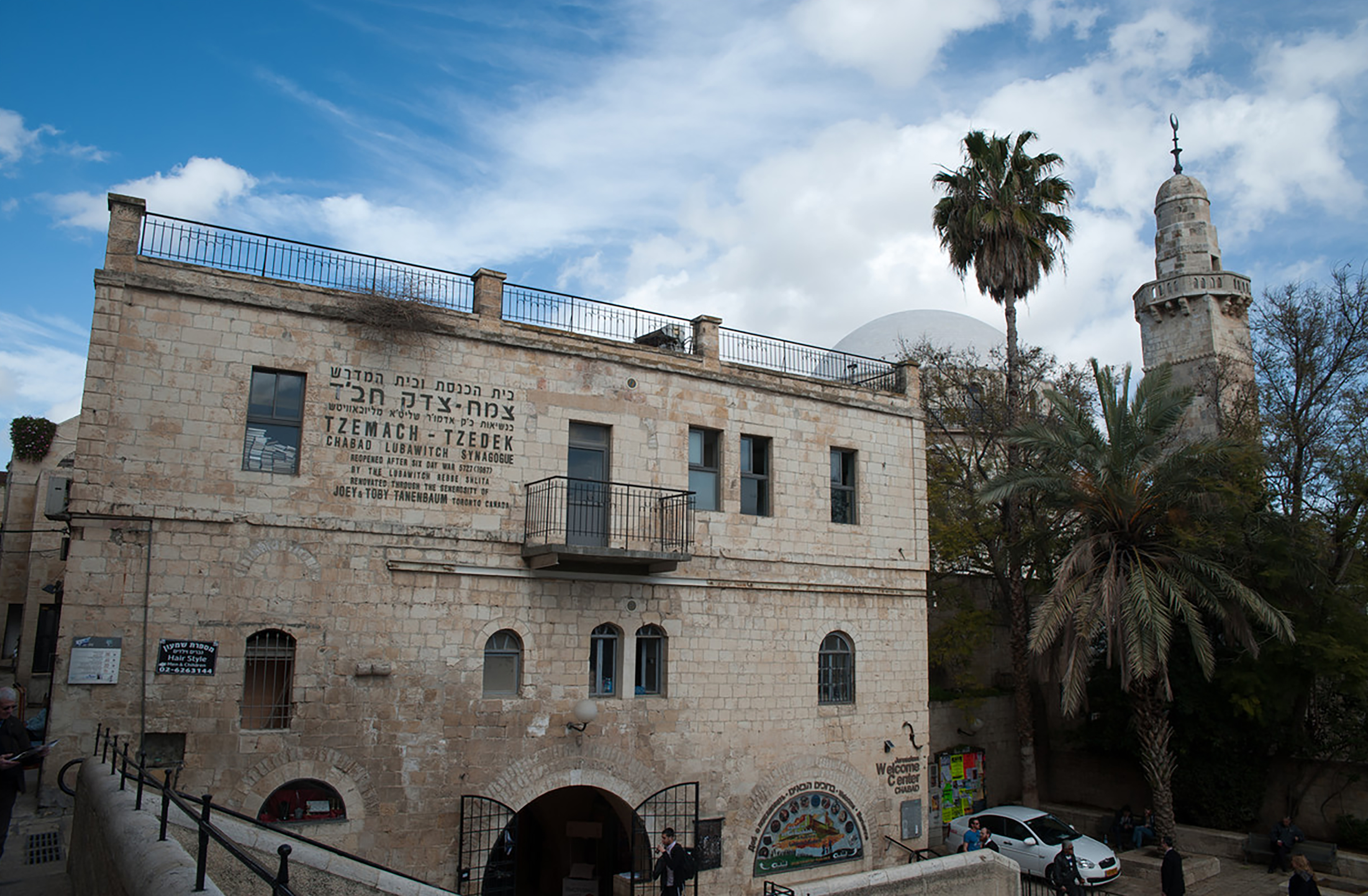
Tzemach Tzedek Synagogue

==== Conservative Judaism ====
Name	Location	Additional Information
Conservative Yeshiva	Agron Street	
Schechter Institute of Jewish Studies	Nayot neighborhood	

==== Reconstructionist Judaism ====
Name	Location	Additional Information
Kehillat Mevakshei Derech	Shai Agnon Street	

==== Reform Judaism ====
Name	Location	Additional Information
Hebrew Union College	King David Street	
Kehillat Har-El	Shmuel haNagid Street	the first Reform synagogue in Jerusalem
Kehillat Kol HaNeshama	The Baka neighbourhood	
Kehillat Mevakshei Derech	The San Simon neighbourhood	

== See also ==
- History of the Jews in Israel
- List of synagogues in Israel
