= History of the Jews in Ancona =

The history of Jews in Ancona, Italy, dates back to the 10th century, when records show the first instance of land rented to a Jew. At some point, a synagogue was built, which was destroyed by an earthquake in 1279. By the 1300s, the Jewish community was more established, and there was an influx of immigrants from Germany. Jews faced special taxes and restrictions on where they could live.

However, Pope Martin V was forced to embrace the Jewish community in his pursuit to build up Ancona as a center of commerce, due to religious prohibitions on Christians charging interest that did not apply to Jews. This created a period of relative acceptance for Anconian Jews that lasted for about 100 years, before Pope Paul IV began to require Jews to convert to Christianity under penalty of death.

The Jewish community of Ancona is one of the oldest and most significant Jewish communities in Italy. In the following centuries the community grew because of the importance of the port and commercial links with the Levant. It continues to exist today, though its population is dwindling.

== First settlement of Jews ==
Jews started living in Ancona, Italy around A.D. 967. In that year, the Archbishop of Ravenna rented a piece of land to a Jew named Eliyahu. It is possible that a synagogue existed already in the 12th century, due to a Slicha written by a Jewish Paytan, referring the 1279 destruction of the town synagogue by an earthquake.

One famous Jewish resident of Ancona was Jacob of Ancona, a traveler who got to China in 1270, four years before Marco Polo, and reported about it in a book he supposedly wrote, called The City of Light.

By 1300, an organized Jewish community apparently existed in Ancona. In 1300, Jewish poet Immanuel the Roman sent a letter to Rome on behalf of the Jewish community in Ancona, asking authorities to lighten taxation due to financial hardships and persecutions of the Jewish community. It seems that Jews mainly worked in money lending.

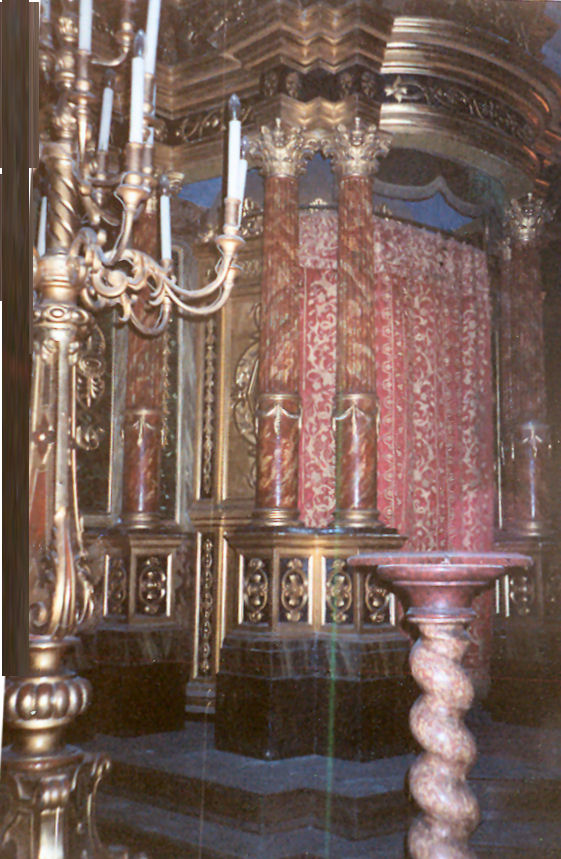
The Ark of the synagogue 12

While the majority of Ancona Jews came from the Muslim east, later they were joined by some German Jews in 1348. In 1427 Saint James of the Marches unsuccessfully tried to force town Jews to wear a Jewish badge and restrict them into one street, though opinions are not unanimous regarding this unsuccessful attempt, claiming Jews were forced to carry a Jewish badge and live in restricted areas. In 1520, the Jews of Ancona were forced once again to wear the Jewish badge, though this rule had been cancelled four years later. In around 1450, the Jewish population of Ancona numbered an estimated 500 persons, consisting of 5% of the town's total population.

After the city had fallen into the Papal state in 1429, Pope Martin V tried to develop Ancona as an Italian center of commerce. In order to achieve that goal, the town Jews got permission to open banks and loan money by interest.

Due to this pro-Jewish approach, Jewish fugitives from the Spanish Inquisition (started in 1492) began to settle in Ancona and changed the demographics and the ratios between the sub-groups of the town Jewish community. Most of these fugitives came from Sicily and later from Naples and Portugal. In 1529, the Jewish false messiah Shlomo Molkho visited Ancona and provoked and stimulated a messianic enthusiasm among the town Jews. As Ancona was declared a free port in around 1532 by Pope Paul III, the city was joined by even more Spanish and Portuguese Jews who found it to be an ideal base for commerce with the Levant. In 1550, the Jewish population of Ancona numbered about 2700 individuals. The pro-Jewish attitude of the Roman Popes protected and stimulated the growth of the Ancona Jewish population, until 1555 when the Vatican approach towards the Ancona Jews had changed due to the persecutions of Pope Paul IV in 1555.

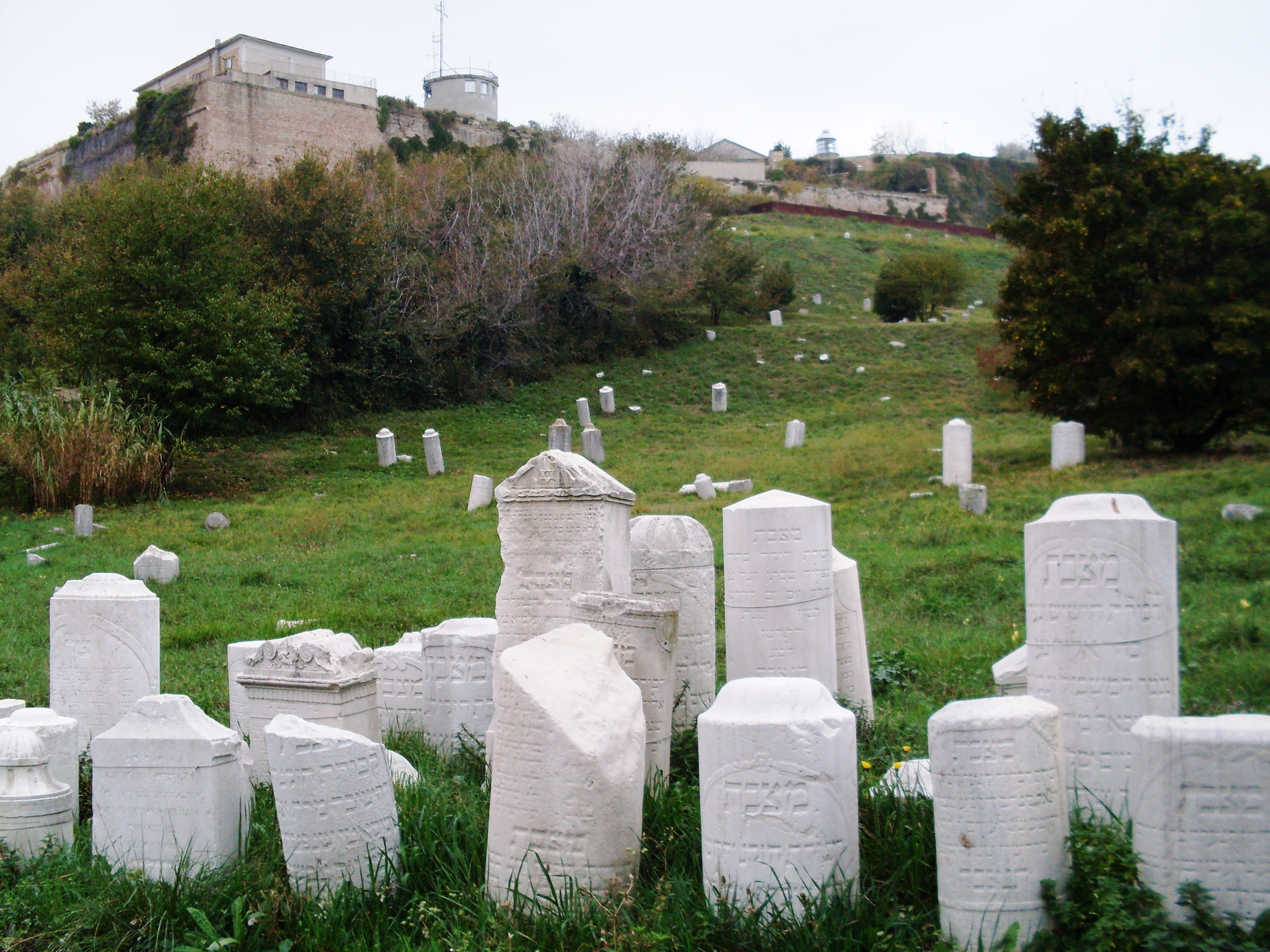
Tombstones in the old Jewish cemetery (32)

== Persecution under Pope Paul IV ==
In contrast to the popes who preceded him, Pope Paul IV turned against the Jewish population of Ancona. During his rule, between the years 1555 and 1559, the town Jews were deprived of valuable franchises, enclosed within a ghetto, limited in their commerce, and heavily taxed, as ordered in Cum nimis absurdum, a papal bull of 1555.

The papal opposition to Crypto-Judaism and Marranos was especially strong. Cesare Galuaba, a papal commissioner, was sent to Ancona in order to incarcerate all Jews who were not willing to be baptized. By that, around 60 Jews renounced their faith; 24 Jews refused to do so and were hanged and then burned, as described in local documents and in "shalshelet HaKabala".

=== Martyrs of 1555 ===
These are the names of the martyrs who died due to their refusal to convert to Christianity upon Pope Paul IV's Bull of 1555:

- Simeon Ben Menachem (Abenmenachem)
- Yoseph Oeff (Guascon in another source)
- Samuel Guascon
- Abraham Falcon
- Isac Nahmias
- Salomon Alguadish
- Moses Paggi (de Paz)
- Salomon Pinto
- Yoseph Molco (Molcho)
- Abraham Cerilia
- David Nahas
- Abraham di Spagna
- Moses Barzilon
- David Reuben (Ruben)
- Salomon Iahia
- David Sadicairo
- Yoseph Verdai
- Yoseph Pappo
- Yacob Cohen
- Yacob Montalban (Montalvano)
- Abraham Lobo
- Yacob Mozzo
- Abraham Cohen
- anonymous woman

=== Ancona boycott ===
The hanging of the 23 Jews that refused to convert in 1555 shocked the Jewish communities around Europe and inspired elegies which are still recited locally on Tisha B'Av. As a result of the persecution, Dona Gracia Mendes Nasi initiated a meeting of some Jewish religious leaders in Istanbul, and decided to boycott any merchant that sent his merchandise to the Ancona port. Jewish Merchants were ordered to send their merchandise to the nearby Pesaro port, a thing that was of the Pesaro leader interest - and after he accepted some of the Ancona Jewish fugitives in order to develop the town port and economics. The boycott divided the Jewish communities to those who supported the boycott – led by the Pesaro Jews and those who objected it, led by the Ancona Jewish community, driven by the fear of the enraging the Pope. Most historians believe the boycott had an effect on the Ancona trade of a short while, shutting down the port, though only for a short time.

== 1569 – 20th century ==
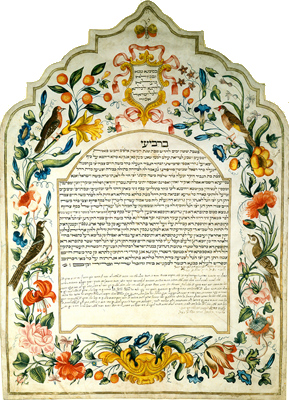
A wedding ketubah (marriage contract) from Ancona, December 25, 1816. The groom was Moses Hayyim Zemah son of Raphael Samson Marpurgo and the bride Rachel daughter of Solomon Moses Sonino

On 1569, when Pope Pius V ordered to expel all Jews from the Papal dominions, the Ancona Jews, (together with the Jews of Rome and Avignon) were able to stay in the city, due to their importance to the trade with the Levant. Nevertheless, many decided to leave.

During the 18th century, an Ashkenazi Jewish community began to emerge. The Morpurgo family, which originated from Maribor or Marburg, was the most influential of them, consisting some well known descendants. In 1763, some 1290 Jews lived in Ancona. During the reign of Napoleon between 1797 and 1799, the Jews were fully emancipated. The gates of the ghetto were removed and the members of the Morpurgo family became members of the city council. In 1814, after Napoleon's defeat and the return of the city to papal dominion, some restrictions were put once again upon the Jewish community by Pope Leo XII. In 1843, an old decree was revived by Fra Vincenzo Soliva, Inquisitor of Ancona, forbidding Jews to reside or own a business outside the ghetto and imposing other restrictions, but public opinion had already turned in Europe by then and the edict was cancelled shortly after until the revolution of 1848 emancipated the Jews once again.

== 20th century and later ==
In 1938, 1177 Jews lived in Ancona. During World War II, persecutions were more individual than collective. The Germans, and later on the Italian fascists, demanded tributes to allow the Jews to live. Eventually, 53 Jews from the town of Ancona were sent to Germany, 15 of whom survived and came back. In 1944, soldiers from the Jewish Brigade arrived in Ancona and helped in the recovery of the Jewish community, which consisted of about 400 by 1967 and 200 in 2004. The future of the Jewish community is unclear, as it declines with time. The community obtained two Synagogues on Via Astagno.

== Notable Jewish residents ==
- Amato Lusitano, 16th century Portuguese Jewish doctor
- Moses ben Mordecai Bassola, 16th century rabbi and head of Yeshivah
- Judah Messer Leon, 15th century rabbi, doctor and philosopher
- Vito Volterra, 20th century mathematician and physicist
- Jacob of Ancona, 13th century traveller to China
- Samson Morpurgo (1681-1740), 18th century rabbi, physician and liturgist

== Cemeteries ==
Ancona has two Jewish cemeteries: Monte-Cardeto, the old one and Tavernelle, the new cemetery. The Monte-Cardeto cemetery is 15000 m^{2} and located in Parco del Cardeto, which is a recreational area in Ancona. It is one of the biggest Jewish cemeteries in Europe. The first documentation concerning it dates from 1428. The cemetery was enlarged in 1462 and in 1711. Some 1058 stones exist in the cemetery; about 700 of them are still in their original location. Around 300 of them have been cataloged. The oldest stone dates to 1552 and belongs to a Jew named Ishai Pinto.
