= David Selbourne =

David Selbourne (born 4 June 1937) is a British political philosopher, social commentator and historian of ideas. He was educated at Manchester Grammar School, and Balliol College, Oxford, where he studied jurisprudence, held the Winter Williams Law Scholarship, and was awarded a Paton Studentship and the Jenkins Law Prize. He was thereafter a British Commonwealth Fellow at the University of Chicago Law School, and in 1960 was called to the bar of the Inner Temple where he was student scholar, but did not practise law. He is the father of Raphael Selbourne, winner of the 2009 Costa First Book Award.

== Background ==
Selbourne was born in London but brought up near Manchester, where his father was in medical practice. A Doctor's Life: The Diaries of Hugh Selbourne MD, which contains his father's observations upon his patients and upon the events of the day, was published in 1989. Praised as 'one of the best modern diaries' by C.S.Handley in his Annotated Bibliography of Diaries Printed in English (2002).

== Works for the theatre ==
David Selbourne's first writings were for the theatre, and were published by Calder, Methuen and others. They include The Play of William Cooper and Edmund Dew-Nevett (1968), The Two-Backed Beast (1969), Samson (1971) and The Damned (1971). His plays were performed between 1968 and 1983 at the Traverse Theatre, Edinburgh, the Everyman Theatre, Liverpool, the Northcott Theatre, Exeter, the Crucible Theatre, Sheffield, the Soho Theatre, London, and elsewhere. In 1982, Selbourne's The Making of A Midsummer Night's Dream, a first-hand account of Peter Brook's rehearsals of the play for the Royal Shakespeare Company, was published, and has since established itself as a key work for students of theatre.

== Stage works ==
- The Play of William Cooper and Edmund Dew-Nevett (produced 1968). 1968.
- The Two-Backed Beast (produced 1968). 1969.
- Dorabella (produced 1969). 1970.
- Samson (produced 1970). 1971.
- Alison Mary Fagan (produced 1972). 1971.
- The Damned 1971.
- Class Play (produced 1972). 1973
- Three Class Plays (for children; produced 1973).
- What's Acting? and Think of a Story, Quickly! (for children; produced 1977). 1977.
- A Woman's Trial (produced in Bengali, as Shrimatir Bichar, 1982)

== Works of social observation, contemporary history and journalism ==
At the same time as teaching social and political theory at Ruskin College, Oxford, from 1966 to 1986, Selbourne contributed as a freelance journalist and commentator to New Society, the New Statesman, the Independent, and the Guardian among other publications. He also travelled widely, visiting China during the Cultural Revolution and writing An Eye to China (1975), and to India during its political emergency of 1975–77, about which he wrote An Eye to India (1977). He continued and broadened this work after leaving Ruskin – and leaving the narrow world of left orthodoxy behind him – writing for The Times, Sunday Times, Daily Telegraph and Sunday Telegraph among others. His heterodox writings in the 1980s on Britain for New Society were published in Left Behind: Journeys into British Politics (1987); in Death of the Dark Hero: Eastern Europe, 1987–1990, he wrote at first-hand on the fall of communism in the region from Poland to Bulgaria, where he also participated in teaching in the 'underground universities'.

== Political thought ==
Selbourne's works of political thought offer a general perspective on events of the last decades, and draw dispassionate and independent-minded conclusions from their consideration. They include Against Socialist Illusion (1985) – written while he was still at Ruskin, a college of adult education supported by the labour movement, and a work which was regarded by the left as a provocation – The Principle of Duty (1994), which argued that limits must be set to selfish individual entitlement if a free social order is to be preserved, The Spirit of the Age: An Account of Our Times (1995) and The Losing Battle with Islam (2005).

== The City of Light ==
There has also been widespread controversy over his book The City of Light (1997), which Selbourne has claimed to be a translation of an account of a trading voyage to China by a thirteenth-century merchant, Jacob of Ancona. Doubted by most scholars, but its authenticity defended by others, it has passed through many subsequent editions, and has been translated in turn into Chinese and some dozen other languages. Thus far, Selbourne has not given further details about its provenance, and has not formally replied to allegations that he is its author. The preface to the American edition of the book (2000) and its introduction describe the controversy and defend the authenticity of the manuscript. In June 2001, he was awarded the Order of Merit of the Italian Republic by president Carlo Azeglio Ciampi. Roz Kaveny, reviewing the book in New Statesman noted that "By coincidence, much of what Jacob d'Ancona dislikes in 13th-century China is what David Selbourne dislikes in late-20th century Britain" and thought that she recognised in the dialectical principles with which d'Ancona controverts his ideological opponents close parallels with Selbourne's own rhetorical techniques. She concluded that one might prefer "to suppose that the dilemma, and the document, are mirages, that his book is a postmodernist literary device."

Chinese Central Television (CCTV) made a three-part documentary film on the work entitled "Return to Zaiton", the first part of which was screened on 17 December 2020

== Published works include ==
- An Eye to China (1975)
- An Eye to India (1977)
- Through the Indian Looking-Glass (1982)
- The Making of A Midsummer Night's Dream (1982)
- In Theory and in Practice: Essays on the Politics of Jayaprakash Narayan, editor (1985)
- Against Socialist Illusion: A Radical Argument (1985)
- Left Behind: Journeys into British Politics (1987)
- A Doctor's Life: The Diaries of Hugh Selbourne M.D., 1960–63, editor (1989)
- Death of the Dark Hero: Eastern Europe 1987–90 (1990)
- The Spirit of the Age (1993)
- Not an Englishman: Conversations with Lord Goodman (1993)
- The Principle of Duty (1994)
- The City of Light: The Hidden Journal of the Man Who Entered China Four Years Before Marco Polo, translator (Jacob of Ancona) (1997)
- Moral Evasion (1998)
- The Losing Battle with Islam (2005)
- The Free Society in Crisis : A History of Our Times (2019)

== Sources ==
- Film Reference
