= The City of Light (book) =

The City Of Light
- Author: "Jacob d'Ancona" (purported)
- Translator: David Selbourne
- Language: English
- Publisher: Little, Brown
- Publication date: 1997
- Publication place: United Kingdom
- Media type: Print

The City of Light or The City Of Light: The Hidden Journal of the Man Who Entered China Four Years Before Marco Polo is a book purportedly made by a scholarly Jewish merchant called "Jacob d'Ancona" who wrote in vernacular Italian, an account of a trading venture he made, in which he reached China in 1271, four years before Marco Polo. The narrative contains political debates about the future of the city in which he engaged with the aid of a translator of mixed Italian and Chinese ancestry. Due to many red-flag elements both in the book's content and its origin, it is widely considered to be a forgery written by David Selbourne, its alleged translator to English. Critics indicated that The City of Light is rather a retrojected allegory mapping suspiciously well onto late-20th-century Western political concerns than an authentic medieval Jewish travelogue.

== Missing manuscript ==
The Italian manuscript from which Selbourne professed to have made his translation has not come to light, even in photocopies; its possessor still remains anonymous. Selbourne asserts that "provenance and rights of ownership over it are unclear," motivating its owner's desire for anonymity.

== Doubts of authenticity ==
The text is considered to be a forgery but there has been continued support for the authenticity of the book.

In 1997, Little, Brown and Company was prepared to publish the diary, under the title The City of Light in the United States. The house had just published the book in the UK when word spread that China scholar Jonathan Spence, the Sterling Professor of History at Yale, had written a book review for The New York Times that questioned the book's authenticity. Despite growing pressure, David Selbourne has continued to refuse to make the original manuscript available for public scrutiny. At the last minute, in September 1997, Little, Brown and Co. pulled the diary from US publication, scheduled for 3 November.

T. H. Barrett, School of Oriental and African Studies, in The London Review of Books, 30 October 1997, described the text as a forgery; he noted that the garbled name Baiciu for a famous rebel "was only known to the narrator of the account in a form which derived from an 18th-century misreading of an Arabic manuscript— as good a proof as any that something is badly amiss." Roz Kaveny, reviewing the book in New Statesman noted that "By coincidence, much of what Jacob d'Ancona dislikes in 13th-century China is what David Selbourne dislikes in late-20th century Britain" and thought that she recognized in the dialectical principles with which d'Ancona controverts his ideological opponents close parallels with Selbourne's own rhetorical techniques. She concluded that one might prefer "to suppose that the dilemma, and the document, are mirages, that his book is a postmodernist literary device."

In December 2007 a University of London professor read a public lecture "The Faking of 'The City of Light'". Bernard Wasserstein, president of the Oxford Center for Hebrew and Jewish Studies, and his brother, David, professor of Islamic history at Tel Aviv University publicly called attention to an anachronism, Jacob's arrival at a mellah in the Persian Gulf, a descriptive for a ghetto based on the root for "salt", that was not used until the 15th century, in Morocco.

In 2018, Stephen G. Haw, writing in the Journal of the Royal Asiatic Society, considered the book to be a modern forgery and cited many issues with the accuracy of the text. Such issues included sailing eastward during the wrong time of the year and the timeframe it took to travel to China, several Chinese words purportedly used by Jacob based on the Wade-Giles romanization system and the influence of popular but outdated information on Champa based on 20th century scholarship. Haw concludes "My own final judgment of Jacob d’Ancona’s The City of Light is that it is an obvious forgery, fabricated by someone with only a very superficial knowledge of Chinese history, culture, and language. Anyone with reasonably good knowledge of thirteenth-century China could not possibly believe that it is genuine."

The first writer to come forward to support the text's authenticity in public was journalist Melanie Phillips, who took issue with Barrett in the Sunday Times, 8 October 1998, and who responded, as did Selbourne, to Barrett's letter to LRB.

== Published versions ==
- The City of Light Translated & Edited By David Selbourne (Little, Brown, 1997)ISBN 9780316639682
- The City Of Light: The Hidden Journal of the Man Who Entered China Four Years Before Marco Polo - Jacob D'Ancona Translated by David Selbourne (Citadel, 2000) ISBN 9781559725231
