= Twin synagogues of Ancona =

Synagogues in Ancona, Italy

Synagogues of Ancona
- Sinagoghe di Ancona
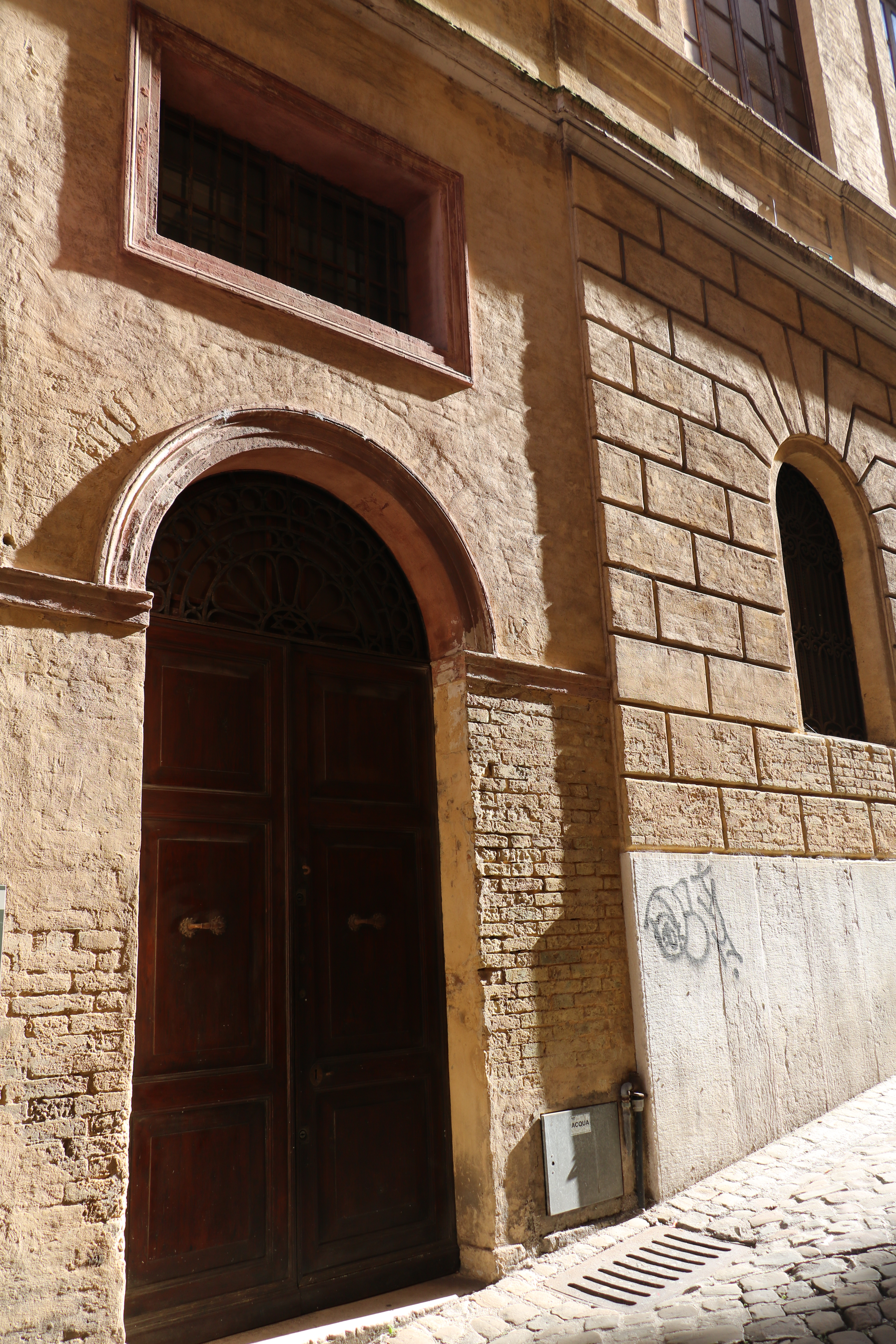
- Exterior of building

Religion
- Affiliation: Judaism
- Rite: Spanish rite Italian rite

Location
- Location: Via Astagno, Ancona, Italy
- Interactive map of Synagogues of Ancona
- Coordinates: 43°37′03″N 13°30′36″E

Architecture
- Completed: 1876

The Twin synagogues of Ancona (Italian: Sinagoghe di Ancona) are a pair of Spanish rite and Italian rite synagogues located in a single building in Ancona, Italy. Although they are remarkably well-preserved, large portions of their original belongings have been transferred to other synagogues as a result of dwindling Jewish populations.

== History ==
There have been a total of six synagogues, half of which were of Spanish rite and half of which were Italian rite, servicing the Jewish community of Ancona. The penultimate pair consisted of a Sephardic one on the port of the city, and the Italian one elsewhere in the city. They were destroyed by Papal forces in 1860 and the Fascist regime in the 20th century respectively. The latter synagogue, which had been built in 1579, was destroyed to make way for Corso Stamira, a road, to be built. Following the destruction of the last Sephardic synagogue, another one was built in its current form in 1876. In 1932, following the destruction of the Italian synagogue, the congregation moved into the modern Sephardic building.

The Sephardic synagogue had restoration done in 1935, shortly before the Holocaust. On October 8, 1943 (Yom Kippur of that year), the congregation closed its doors and hid its Torah scrolls following the German invasion of Italy.

In the late 20th century and the beginning of the 21st century, the synagogue began restoration under De Feo Antonio Restauri, a cultural heritage restoration organization based in Rome.

An 18th-century Torah ark was transferred to a synagogue at the University of Tel Aviv, and another from the 17th century survives at the Hekhal Yacov synagogue in Bat Yam. The balcony of the bema in one of the shuls came from the Synagogue of Pesaro, which became inactive due to a lack of Jews in the town. The Italian Immigrants Union in Israel presented a 19th-century Torah scroll from the synagogue to Mivtahim, Israel.

== Description ==
=== Sephardic synagogue ===
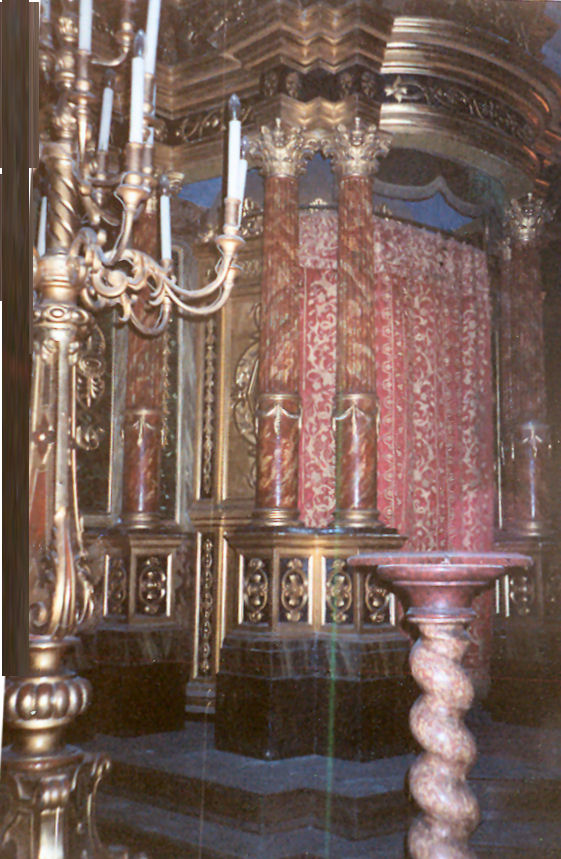
Torah ark in the Sephardic synagogue

The exterior of the building is narrow and located between two others. It has five tall, arched glass windows. The interior contains an original bema and Torah ark. They were recovered from the previous iteration of the synagogues before their destruction, made of wood and stucco. A large golden crown tops the ark and ten columns of faux marble and painted wood flank both sides, along with gilded Corinthian capitals. The doors to the ark are embossed with silver of Sephardic tradition, and are uncommon in Italian rite synagogues.

The entrance door is located under the gallery that supports the bema.

=== Italian synagogue ===
Many of the original furnishings from the old Italian synagogue still survive in its modern form, including some dating back to the 16th century. The complex also contains a Mikveh, as well as a terrace accessible from the staircase leading to the women's section, which is used to form the Sukkah during the harvest season.

The interior is bimodal and has the canopy of the bema between the two entrance doors. The Torah ark is surmounted by a classical-style tynpanum accentuated with silver doors carved with floral motifs and the 10 Commandments tablets. it is flanked by two twisting columns, decorated with large gilded leaves. A large candelabra with seven slots overshadows the furnishings.

== See also ==
- List of synagogues in Italy
