= Raphael Selbourne =

British writer (born 1968)

Raphael Selbourne (born 1968 in Oxford, England) is an English writer. His debut novel Beauty was awarded the 2009 Costa First Novel Award and the McKitterick Prize in 2010.

== Background ==
Born in Oxford, his father is political commentator David Selbourne. He grew up in Oxford and studied Politics at the University of Sussex before moving to Italy. He lived in the West Midlands for many years, the setting for his debut novel Beauty.

== Bibliography ==
- Selbourne, Raphael (2009), Beauty, Tindal Street Press, ISBN 9780955647673
