= Hausdorf =

Hausdorf (also spelled Hausdorff) is a surname of German origin. Notable individuals with the surname include:

- Anna Hausdorff (born 2000), German footballer
- Azriel Zelig Hausdorf (1826–1905), Prussian philanthropist
- Bertoldo Schmidt Hausdorf (1902–1971), Chilean politician
- Bernhard Hausdorf, German zoologist
- Felix Hausdorff (1868–1942), German mathematician
- George Hausdorf (1894–1959), German painter
- Hartwig Hausdorf (born 1955), German author
- Heinz Hausdorf (1922–1996), German graphic designer
- Natasha Hausdorff (born 1989), British barrister
