= Tuvia =

Tuvia may refer to

- Tuvia (given name)
- Be'er Tuvia, a moshav in Israel
  - Be'er Tuvia Regional Council
