= Douglas Falconer =

Douglas Falconer may refer to:

- Doug Falconer (Canadian football) (1952–2021), Canadian professional football player
- Douglas Scott Falconer (1913–2004), British geneticist
- Douglas Falconer (judge) (1914–2007), British judge
