= Chaim Tzvi Schneerson =

Old Yishuv Zionist (1834–1882)

- חיים צבי שניאורסון
- Born: 1834; Lyubavichi, Mogilev Governorate, Russian Empire
- Died: 1884 (aged 49–50); South Africa
- Years active: 1852–1878

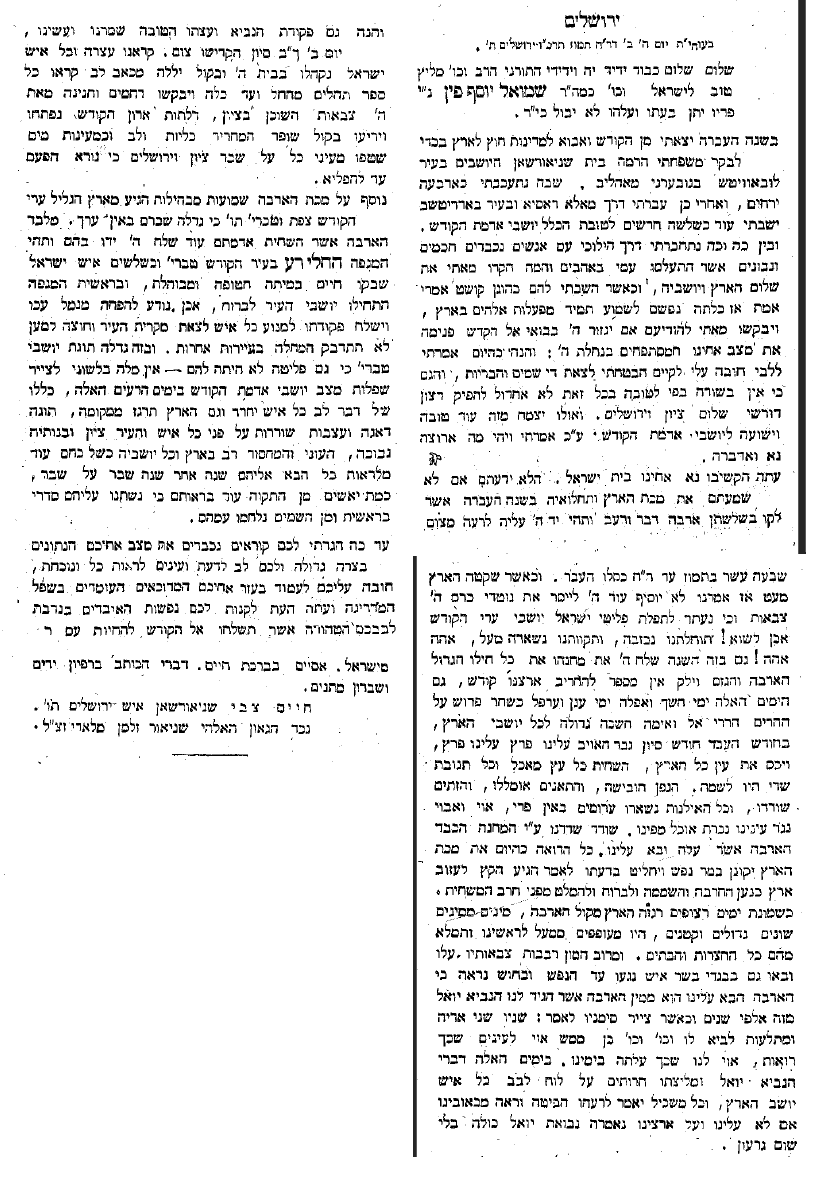
Letter by Chaim Tzvi Schneersohn in HaCarmel, 13 July 1866, pp. 2-3.

Chaim Tzvi Schneerson (Hebrew: חיים צבי שניאורסון, sometimes anglicized as Haym Zevee Sneersohn, Haym Zvi Sneersohn, or Hayyim Zvi Sneersohn) (1834–1882) was a Jewish-Belarusian Zionist of the Old Yishuv, a doctor, and a Chabad Chasid.

Schneerson spent many of his formative years in Israel, but most of his working years in Australia, Europe, and the United States to raise money for Jewish communities in Israel and to educate foreigners about the plight of Jews abroad.

== Early life ==
Schneerson was born in 1834 in Lubavitch to Rabbi Nachum Yosef and Sarah Rivka, herself the daughter of Rabbi Moshe Shniori, son of Rabbi Shneur Zalman of Liadi. In 1840, he immigrated with his parents and his brothers Shneur Zalman and Pinchas Eliyahu to the land of Israel and settled in Hebron, which was the center of Chabad Hasidism in Israel at the time. After a few years had passed, they moved to Jerusalem, and later received a British sponsorship where he learned English. During his years in the United States later on, he received American citizenship. Schneerson heavily studied both the Talmud and Torah to such an extent that the local rabbis ordained him at his Bar Mitzvah.

When he was 18 years old, he began going on missions as a doctor to communities in different countries to visit their Jewish communities, such as Syria, Egypt, Iran, Romania, England, and France.

== Career ==
Schneerson published articles in Hebrew presses in Israel and abroad. One of his articles was quoted in Moshe Hess' book, Rome and Jerusalem. He would often travel and speak at Zionist events and was an advocate for Jewish settlement in Israel. He worked for a long time with Romanian Jewry and wrote the book The Land of Israel and Roumania – Description of the Holy Land and the situation of Roumania and Romanian Jews in the Past and Present. In his book, he developed his idea for the foundation of an independent Jewish state in the Land of Israel.

Berl Katznelson wrote about Schneerson, saying:

Rabbi Haim Zvi Schneerson, a Jew of good stature, good manners, and a good communicator, "who will stand before kings" and he traded his language to speak English. He would go to the countries of Europe and America and the ends of Asia and Australia and announce the return of Israel, and published letters and pamphlets in English about the knowledge of the land and the State of Israel in different countries, out of a broad political outlook. One could say: radical in the spirit of the 1860s, in a clear trend of land settlement and a staunch "Zionist-political", in our language today out of a passionate belief that the day is near. This "Shadr" was a lecturer in front of Christian audiences, and he would gain admirers and respect everywhere... and even [Ulysses S.] Grant, the president of the United States, came and lectured before him orally and in writing about the situation of the Jews of Romania and about the establishment of Israel, and on the need to appoint consuls to be Israel's ambassador. And with that, he would publish letters to the Jewish Chronicle and present the hardships of the Yishuv and continuously support what is called nowadays "productivization" of the Yishuv and putting the people on the ground floor.

In 1852, Rabbi Schneerson left on his first mission on behalf of the communities of Hebron and Jerusalem and traveled to Damascus, Aleppo and Egypt. He made his way back to Israel through the desert. 5 years later, on behalf of the Hebron and Jerusalem communities, he went to Persia, India, China and Australia. In India, he mainly visited Mumbai and Calcutta. During his visit to China, he also spent several days with Baghdadi businessman of the Sassoon family, Reuven David Sassoon.

=== Trip to Australia ===
After his return to Israel, Schneerson prepared to go to Ethiopia to speak with the Beta Israel community, but the funding was pulled to allocate money for the building of the Batei Mahse, a complex in the Jewish Quarter of Jerusalem to house the poor, funded by Kollel Hod. Schneerson went to Australia instead for the purpose of raising funds, and his international talks gained prominent coverage in Jewish newspapers around the world. He traveled to Australia that time in 1861 with funding from both Kollel Hod and the Council of the Sephardi Committee, headed by Rabbi Chaim David Hazan, a rare time of both communities working together to help the poor. The trip was deemed a success, but was delayed due to a ship he boarded sinking on the coast of India on route to his destination.

Schneerson landed in Australia in 1861. He first worked in Melbourne, where he held a Hebrew-language meeting on 1 December 1861 with leaders of the Jewish community there (supported by Melbourne Rabbi Isaac Lyons), and they decided to establish a committee for the purpose of organizing interfaith meetings with both Jews and Christians. Both rabbis such as Schneerson, and Christian clerics in the city, such as Dean of Melbourne Hussey Macartney spoke at these events. Following the joint assembly, an association was established in the city to support Jews in the Land of Israel called Honani Ofer Zion. The collection of funds was successful, and city's papers published detailed reports of the joint assembly, and the Jewish newspaper Hamagid also talked about the success extensively. Schneerson, during his time in Israel, published a pamphlet called "The Salvation of Israel", in which he delivered his first speech before the joint assembly with an English translation of the pamphlet by the community's rabbi. He also shared the publication that appeared in the local newspaper, The Argus, and a summary of the proposals received at that meeting.

Ethnographer Jacob Saphir spread doubt on the credibility of Scneerson's mission, saying that the plan was fruitless and that Schneerson had pocketed much of the money raised, but upon confirmation by the organization and Schneerson's popularity among the dignitaries, Saphir ended up leaving the country the week of his "expose"'s publication, and was ridiculed by critics for his attacks on the Rabbi in the following weeks. Prior to his leaving, he sought the aid of the Melbourne synagogue, but was turned away because the congregation was in support of Schneerson.

Following his successes in Melbourne, Schneerson continued his journey through Victoria and New South Wales, where religious figures helped raise funds for housing in Israel during joint assemblies similar to the one that took place in Melbourne. He even went as far as Hobart, where he gave another speech to the Jewish community, this time off of the mainland. During his time in Hobart, Schneerson granted two kiddush cups to the congregation there, one of which is now in the Jewish Museum of Australia. Rabbi M. Myers of Melbourne estimated that 75% of the funds collected in Australia came from Christian donors.

=== Publications in Jewish newspapers ===
Schneerson's activities in Australia, including excerpts from his speeches and the speeches of the other speakers at the events he organized, reached the Jewish press in Europe through the Australian press. This is in addition to the Jewish Chronicle in London, which employed its own reporter in Australia who authored the articles about the events, which circulated throughout the British Empire, leading to Schneerson's ideas on Israeli reestablishment being widely publicized in Europe. Many of these papers noted similarities in his ideas to the words of Rabbi Zvi Hirsch Kalischer.

At the same time of Schneerson's activities in Australia, the Society for the Settlement of Eretz Yisrael was established in Frankfurt am Main by David Luria. The Hamagid, which was aware of both activities, supported the publication of Schneerson's work to support Luria's organization in Frankfurt. One example of Schneerson's writing was a speech about Jerusalem's destruction by the Romans and its subsequent history, given at talks in Australia to raise money for Jerusalem. Moshe Hess mentioned the Melbourne meeting in an appendix to his book Rome and Jerusalem. A notable Australian politicians, John Young, Governor of New South Wales, attended one of his talks in Sydney among a "large number" of citizens. Even in 1863, news about Schneerson's actions and speeches continued to be published in Europe, such as in Der Israelit.

Schneerson departed to return to Israel in April 1863 and was praised for his successful mission, and even received a letter of appreciation from Rabbi Hazan. While in Israel, he came across Rabbi Kalischer's book, Derisht Zion, in which he found ideas similar to his own. He was also impressed by the David Gordon article, "Return and Rejoicing", published in the Hamagid. In light of these words, he began to devote more of his time to the idea of the renewal of the Jewish state. He began to publish writings in the Jewish Chronicle, writing in Hebrew and later having it translated into English. His second article, "Jerusalem – The Plan for Settlement", was one in which he writes that it is not true that the residents of Israel wanted to rely on funding forever, and most residents wanted an independent economy to "work by the sweat of their brow". Another prominent one was published in 1863 the Havatzelet advocating for the establishment of agricultural colonies in Israel. Schneerson would write many more articles advocating for the Jewish purchase of land in Ottoman Palestine for settlement and agricultural growth. Schneerson also wrote for the paper, The Observer in a New Land, which began to be published in the United States in 1871. He is also notable for his descriptions of the 1834 Hebron massacre, which he recorded during his time in the city in 1872.

=== Activity in Israel ===
In 1863, a large assembly was held in Jerusalem at Schneerson's initiative to commemorate Chaim David Hazan and dignitaries from other denominations. The purpose of the assembly was to examine if it was feasible to switch Jewish settlement regions in Israel to agricultural colonies. The assembly decided, among other things, that a license should be obtained from the government to purchase land to cultivate it, and that a three-year support infrastructure should be established to start the project. Following the assembly, about a hundred families announced their desire to move to agricultural work and the committee was headed by Schneerson and Rabbi Moshe Benvanishti. The initiative did not come to fruition due to the decline of the "Society for the Settlement of the Land of Israel" in Frankfurt, on which the initiative was based, as well as due to the deterioration of the Turkish government's attitude towards Jews, which was also reflected in their order in 1864 to close the two Hebrew newspapers that were in Israel at that time.

==== Travel attempt to Ethiopia, Yemen, and China ====
In 1864, Romanian-Jewish traveler J. J. Benjamin wanted to go on a journey to visit the Jews of Ethiopia, Yemen, and China to learn about the situation of Jews in faraway lands, as he had heard about the persecution of Jews in those regions and the overall curiosity of visiting China. He sought support of the Board of Deputies of British Jews, and in London, a committee considered his travel there, but Benjamin passed away while preparing for the trip. Hearing about the cancelled plans in the Jewish Chronicle, Schneerson contacted the committee with a request that they send him in Benjamin's place, as he had experience with faraway travel before. He also saw the trip as an opportunity to spread ideas of Zionism to the isolated Jewish communities. He believed that the fact that these isolated communities had stayed Jewish despite a lack of support from the outside was a testament to their firm faith. However, his offer for the mission was not accepted, and a mission to the community of Ethiopia was carried out by the AIU in 1867.

==== Reporting ====
In 1866, the Jewish settlements in Israel experienced a drought, an infestation of locusts, and a cholera epidemic. In that year, Schneerson, who had returned from a trip to Romania, began to serve as a reporter for the London newspaper describing the awful situation in Israel. His reporting tone changed from one requesting investment in agriculture to a dire need for humanitarian aid. He also reported on smaller local happenings, such as the visit to Israel by Moses Montefiore, who Schneerson proposed an establishment of enterprises to prevent future prise fluctuations on foodstuffs in case of another drought. The proposal was denied. Schneerson began to become more hostile in his reporting, describing the ineptitude of efforts carried out by the government, causing his dismissal from his reporter status by the Kollels.

Schneerson continued to publish articles as an independent reporter, including one titled "Voice of Complaint from Jerusalem", where he criticized leaders of the Kollels, who he said were thwarting operative initiatives to aid the settlements. He also accused them of taking advantage of their collection methods and inappropriate use of the funds.

==== Judah and Israel Company ====
After being denied his initiative by Montefiore, Schneerson decided to carry out the project himself. He founded the Yehuda and Israel Society with the help of Rabbi Azriel Zelig Hausdorf and Nathan Cornell to establish a wheat and coal warehouse in Jerusalem for winter use. The Prussian consul ended up funding the project, and was used by both Jewish and Muslim residents during the winter for cheaper supply of materials not gatherable during the season.

==== In Tiberias ====
During his time in Tiberias, Schneerson looked to start a project to supply medicine for local pharmacies. He used his connection with English Jewry to find supplies for the project. He also started an initiative to establish an agricultural settlement of about 60 families from the city who expressed desires to farm. He wrote to a newspaper in England, and met with British-Jewish dignitaries to fund the agriculture project, but the project never came about.

=== Romania ===
In 1865, Schneerson went on a mission to Romania for a year, where he reported on the political, economic, and geographic conditions of Jewry in the country. Several years later, Schneerson began to work for the Jews in Romania, getting Jew Benjamin Franklin Peixotto appointed as American consul in Romania. Peishuto began to work to help the Jews in Romania economically and politically.

=== England ===
In June 1868, Schneerson arrived in England stayed there about two months for the previously mentioned purpose of helping the Jews of Tiberias. During this period, Schneerson held public lectures and private meetings with influential public figures such as Sir Francis Goldsmid, a Jewish member of the British Parliament and Richard Dobbs. He also argued for support to improve the situation of security of the Jews in Israel from the worsening Ottoman attitude of Jewish people. His mission was unsuccessful, and he left England in disappointment, stating "I hoped that from England would come the salvation of our brothers, The Israelites in the Holy Land, but oh, I was wrong!" He expressed hope that the AIU would help to realize his initiative. His funds for the mission ran out, and he traveled to the United States to spread his ideas, where he did manage to raise some funds for Israel.

=== United States ===
==== New York ====
In 1869, Schneerson arrived in the United States, equipped with letters of recommendation for making connections with influential Jewish and Christian circles. His mastery of the English language, rhetorical talent, and his unique appearance in oriental clothing all contributed to the popularity of his lectures and his interest to the press. Israel Klausner believed that at the time of the visit, Schneerson reached the acme of his influence.

Upon his arrival in the United States, an invitation was sent to him on behalf of public figures in New York, who wanted to hear his ideas. Among those who signed the invitation were Rabbi Yehuda Lyons of the Spanish and Portuguese community, Shaarit Israel, the oldest Jewish community in the United States, Rabbi Yona Bundy, editor of The Hebrew Leader, Rabbi Shmuel Meir Isaacs, editor of The Jewish Messenger, Rabbi Dr. David Einhorn of Adath Yeshurun, Dr. Shmuel Adler of Temple Emmanuel-El, and Rabbi Dr. Shlomo Sonnenschein, as well as Henry Ward Beecher, brother of Harriet Beecher Stowe. The stated request by the following Rabbis resulted in a lecture at the New-York Historical Society on 17 February 1869.

==== Washington D.C. ====
In Washington, as part of his lecture circuit, he also spoke twice before state dignitaries, including the family of President Ulysses S. Grant and the Turkish ambassador to the United States. Schneerson even attempted to get the administration to move the embassy in the Ottoman Empire to Jerusalem. Schneerson also met with the Secretary of State Hamilton Fish and President Grant himself, which made a great impression in the Jewish community in America. Some in the Jewish press congratulated his actions and some criticized the fact that he acted alone without being sent by an organization.

His meeting with the Secretary of State and interview with the President were published in newspapers across the United States, and some of them even published his entire speech to the president. The Washington newspaper, the National Intelligencer, even supported his request to replace the ambassador to Jerusalem under allegations that he was attempting to proselytize. In 1869, the embassy was officially moved to Jerusalem.

Schneerson's success in the embassy matter encouraged him to contact the President regarding the plight of Romanian Jews. In January 1870, he addressed the president in an open letter, which he also published in newspapers, in which he requested that the United States government act to alleviate the situation of the Jews in Romania (including a recent massacre) by joining in with other European nations to put pressure in the Romanian government. Using his rhetorical skills, he connected the situation to American moral values of freedom and justice.

==== Other cities ====
Following his open letter, his publicity grew in the US and he was invited to lecture before both Jews and Christians in many cities across the country, such as in: Cincinnati, Baltimore, Milwaukee, Nashville, New Orleans, San Francisco, Hartford, Rochester, Buffalo, and Chicago. One example in November 1870, he was invited by the Church of Jesus Christ of Latter-day Saints to give a lecture to them in Salt Lake City. In his lectures in the city described the current situations regarding Jewish settlement in Israel, as well as Muslim customs in the area. Although his speeches in other cities would sometimes cover many other topics, such the geography and history of Ancient Israel. He, in part, also spread his views on the future of the Holy Land within the framework of Israel's establishment, while offering practical solutions for near-term issues.

In 1871, he joined journalist Zvi Hirsh Bernstein to begin the publication of the Hebrew newspaper, Observing Israel, in New York. Schneerson took a prominent part in writing for the paper and helped distribute it during his travels in the United States. In articles he wrote, he described his impressions of Jewish communities in the United States that he visited. He wrote strongly about the preservation of religion among American Jewry to strengthen their own communities, and he continued writing about Zionist topics.

== Return to Tiberias ==
In 1874, Schneerson returned to Tiberias due to his health condition, taking advantage of the warm climate. He was in an unstable financial situation, and opened up a pawnshop. He renewed his earlier initiative to start an agricultural colony, and opposed partition orders by the government. His activity had heavy opposition from the Hasidic and Kollel leadership. They disapproved of his positions and various accusations were hurled at him, such as the idea that he had embezzled donation funds for the poor and that he was an apostate and convert. Eventually, Judge Avraham Zvi Halevi imposed a boycott on Schneerson, and many were unhappy with the lax punishment, and was stoned and beaten on 28 November 1874. His property was looted, and he was imprisoned for five days and led naked through the streets of the city on a donkey as a punishment. He was expelled from the city, and was found on the ground by a Franciscan abbot, who saved his life. The Duke of Oldenburg, who had heard about his situation while in Israel, paid for him to be transferred to a hospital in Jerusalem, where he stayed for the next two months.

After he recovered, Schneerson tried to get justice for his unfair treatment and attempted to get his attackers prosecuted. He was severely slandered across several publications in Europe during his long legal battle. Eventually, under pressure of the US Ambassador in Beirut, the governor of Tiberias arrested 9 of the leaders who organized his beatings, but ended up releasing him after protesters broke out in violence. Jewish residents were under threat of collective punishment by the government for the situation, and Montefiore and other prominent figures stepped in to cease the dialogue. Schneerson was declared a danger to the public, and was unable to successfully gain compensation for his injuries and destroyed belongings.

The Jewish Chronicle referred to the affair as a typical example of a fanatical opposition to a man who made efforts to stop the partition system.

== Final years ==
Before departing Israel, Schneerson founded a small bank in Jerusalem with Natan Greengart.

Schneerson's last trip was to South Africa, with the aim of engaging in similar activities to his times in Australia. When he reached the Cape of Good Hope, he fell ill shortly afterwards due to the diseases found in the country. He was placed in quarantine in the country and died in 1884. According to British authorities and his brother Pinchas, he was buried in Israel.

== Family ==
Schneerson's elder brother Rabbi Shneor Zalman, author and publisher of many manuscripts of rabbinical and Kabbalah literature, purchased the rich Torah library of Rabbi Hida. In the Bitown Ma'ayan it is written that at the request of Montefiore, he was among the leaders of the Chabad sect in Jerusalem, and he was described in some sources as the "co-superintendent of the kollel". As for his younger brother Pinchas Eliyahu, a letter from him to Charles Netter is located in the Mikva Israel archive.

His son Avraham Shmuel was sent to study at the school of Dr. Avraham Albert Cohen from the beginning of the 18th century, who was appointed as his tutor. Avraham Shmuel studied medicine and was a doctor in Berdychiv. Another son, Moshe, lived in Safed and moved to the United States and was a Hasidic rabbi. Schneerson had two daughters.

Schneerson is a distant relative of Menachem Mendel Schneerson of the Lyubavitchi Schneerson family, considered to be one of the most influential Rabbis in Hasidic Judaism.

== Sources ==
- Klausner, Israel (1973). רבי חיים צבי שניאורסון : ממבשרי מדינת ישראל (in Hebrew). Jerusalem: Mossad Harav Kook.
