= Chaim David Hazan =

Rabbinical scholar (1790–1869)

- חיים דוד חזן
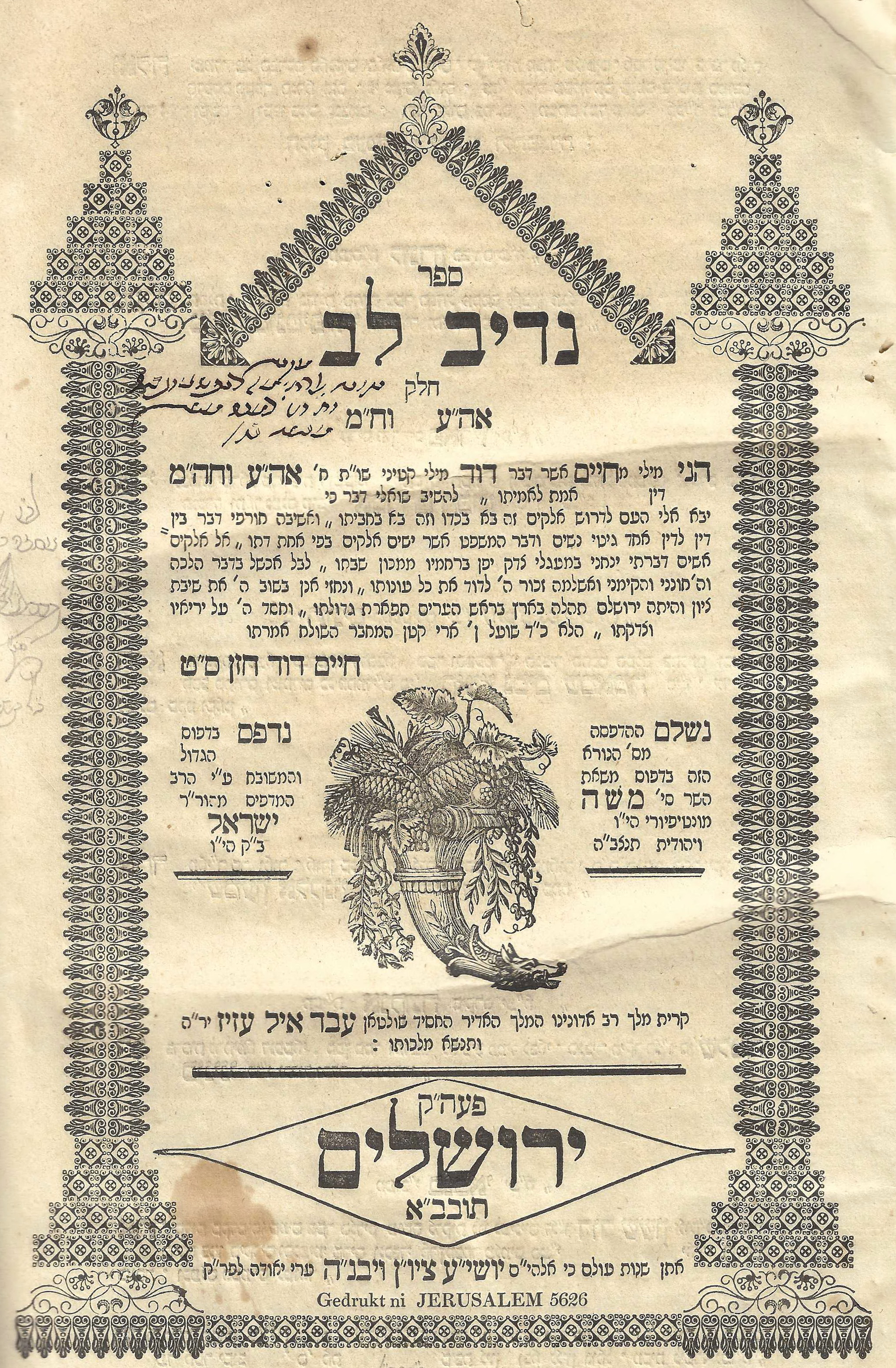
- A posthumous 1926 edition of one of his books, "Benevolent"
- Born: 1790; İzmir, Ottoman Empire
- Died: January 17, 1869 (aged 78/79); Jerusalem, Ottoman Empire
- Spouse: Joya Esther
- Father: Joseph ben Hayyim Hazan
- Relatives: Eliezer Hazan (brother); Rachmim Eliyahu Hazan (brother); Haim Palachi (nephew); Eliyahu Bechor Hazan (grandson)

Chaim David Hazan (Hebrew: חיים דוד חזן; 1790 – January 17, 1869) nicknamed Chad Badara (Hebrew: ח"ד בדרא) was an Av Beit Din in İzmir, rabbinical scholar, and Rishon LeZion of Israel.

== Early life and formative years ==
Born in İzmir to Sephardic Rabbi Raphael Yosef Hazan, son of Chaim, and Reina Falaji, Hazan learned the profession of shochet from a young age. His father was a chief rabbi in the city and considered a great sage of the 19th century. By the time he had grown into adulthood, he was chosen as the head of the shochets in the area. By 1840, he was appointed to a head position in the city's rabbi community, a position he held until 1855.

== Emigration to Israel and career ==
In 1855, he immigrated to Eretz Yisroel and settled in Jerusalem, where he was appointed to the Beit Din alongside Moshe Benvenisti, Yitzhak Cordoviro, Yitzhak Kalmaro, and Avraham Amar. In 1859, he went on a mission with five other rabbis from Jerusalem to Vienna, but he fell ill and returned home. In 1861, Rabbi Chaim Nissim Abulafia died, and Hazan was elected to take his place in the rabbinate as the Chief Sephardi Rabbi in Israel, as well as Hakham Bashi of Jerusalem, and the two roles were united for the region with his election. He worked extensively for the agricultural settlements in the land, and he worked in close proximity with Zvi Hirsch Kalischer, to which the two decided on planting willow trees in the settlement of Kfar Hashiloah. He also played an active role in the development of the Batei Mahse complex.

In 1863, a large assembly was held in Jerusalem at the initiative of Hazan, Chaim Tzvi Schneerson, and other dignitaries from the community with the aim of examining how many emigrants of the Old Yishuv were willing to switch to agricultural work to develop settlements in the region. The assembly decided, among other things, that it was necessary to obtain a license from the government to purchase land for cultivation, and that a three-year support system should be established before the beginning of the project. Following the meeting, around 100 families announced their desire to work as farmers on the land, and the project was headed by Hazan, Schneerson, and Benvenisti. The initiative never came to fruition due to deteriorating relations between the Jews and the Ottoman government.

He resided in the Mishkenot Sha'ananim neighborhood, the first Jewish settlement outside of the walled limits of the city. When the 1863-1875 cholera pandemic reached Jerusalem in 1865, he moved inside the walls to share in the city's grief. He died on January 17, 1869 and is buried at the Mount of Olives Jewish Cemetery.

== Family ==
Hazan was initially married to Joya Esther, daughter of Yisrael Chaim HaCohen Hamzi. She died in 1862, and he remarried in his final years to a woman named Sultana. He had an older brother, Rabbi Eliezer Hazan, as well as brothers Rachmim Eliyahu Hazan and Yitzhak Hazan. He had a sister, Kali Kaden, who became the mother of Chaim Falaji. His pedigree is as follows:

- Avraham Hazan (1815–1875), a butcher in Aydin
- Gershon Hazan (died 1870)
- Joshua Hazan (died 1877)
- Raphael Joseph Hazan (1823–1877)
  - Rabbi Eliyahu Bechor Hazan, Av Beit Din in Alexandria
  - Aharon di Yosef Hazan, writer and editor of Ladino newspapers in İzmir
- Rachel, wife of Rabbi Bechor Chaim Yitzhak Nachum (1834–1896)
- Israel Sheikh Hazan (1835–1896)
- Moshe Hazan
  - Sarah (m. Joseph Raphael Uziel)
    - Ben-Zion Meir Hai Uziel

== Selected works ==
- Hazan, Chaim David. ספר אגן הסהר : והוא פי' על משלי [The Book on the Crescent Basin: Book of Proverbs] (in Hebrew). Thessaloniki.
- Hazan, Chaim David. ספר חוזה דוד : והוא פירוש על תהילים בדרך דרש [Treatise on the Book of David] (in Hebrew). Amsterdam.
- Hazan, Haim David (1844). תורת זבח - שחיטה וטרפות [Slaughter and Predation] (in Hebrew). Thessaloniki.
- Hazan, Hayim David (1862). נדיב לב - חלק א-ב [Benevolent - Volumes I & II] (in Hebrew). Thessaloniki.
- Hazan, Hayim David (1870). ישרי לב [Honest-hearted] (in Hebrew). İzmir.
