= Tuvia (given name) =

Tuvia (also spelled Tuviah and Tuvya) is a Hebrew male given name that may refer to

- Tuvia Beeri (1929–2022), Czech-Israeli painter
- Tuvia Bielski (1906–1987), Jewish partisan leader
- Tuviah Friedman (1922–2011), Nazi hunter
- Tuvia Friling (born 1953), Israeli historian
- Tuvia Aryeh Goldberger (1856–1910), Hungarian rabbinic dayan
- Tuvia Grossman, American-Israeli victim of Arab mob violence
- Tuvia Hod-Hochwald (1949–2019), Israeli-German rabbi
- Tuvia Katz (born 1936), Israeli artist
- Tuvya Ruebner (1924–2019), Israeli poet and translator
- Tuvia Sagiv (born 1947), Israeli architect
- Tuvia Tenenbom (born 1957), Israel theater director, playwright, author, journalist and essayist
- Tuvia Tzafir (born 1945), Israeli actor and entertainer

== See also ==
- Tevye
