= Joseph ben Hayyim Hazan =

Sephardic chief rabbi of Jerusalem (1741–1819)

Joseph ben Ḥayyim Hazan
- יוסף בן חיים חזן

Personal life
- Born: 1741 Smyrna, Ottoman Empire
- Died: November 11, 1819 (aged 77–78) Jerusalem, Ottoman Empire
- Children: Elijah Rachamim, Eliezer, Isaac, Chaim David
- Parent: Chaim Hazan
- Known for: Chief Rabbi of Jerusalem, rabbi of Hebron
- Occupation: Chief Rabbi of Jerusalem
- Relatives: Hayyim Palaggi (grandson); Israel Moses Hazan (grandson)

Religious life
- Religion: Judaism

Joseph ben Ḥayyim Hazan (1741 – November 11, 1819) was a Sephardi ḥakham and chief rabbi of Jerusalem. At first rabbi in his native city, he went to Land of Israel in 1811, settling at Hebron, where he became rabbi. In 1813 he was elected chief rabbi of Jerusalem, which position he held until his death.

== Life ==
=== Early life and activities in Izmir ===
Yosef Chazan was born in 1741 in Smyrna, Ottoman Empire (now İzmir, Turkey), to Rabbi Chaim Chazan, a prominent rabbi in the city. He came from a distinguished lineage of rabbis, including Rabbi David Chazan, Rabbi Chaim Chazan, and Rabbi Yosef Chazan, the author of "Ein Yosef". He was also a descendant of Rabbi Abraham Chazan of Girona, a contemporary of Nachmanides, and the author of the liturgical poem "Ahot Ketana".

Chazan began his studies under his father, but after his father's early death, he was supported by relatives and community leaders, allowing him to dedicate himself to Torah study. At 17, he began preaching at the Etz Chaim community, where his ancestors had served. He held various roles, including guardian of orphans' and widows' assets and community endowments.

In 1770, at 29, he was appointed one of three city judges by Rabbi Chaim Abulafia, the senior rabbi of Izmir. Four years later, he became a senior Torah educator. In 1790, the city's rabbis chose him as a teacher and legal authority. In 1794, after the departure of Rabbi Chaim Modai to Safed, Chazan was appointed, alongside Rabbi Raphael Isaac Mayo, as the leading rabbi of Izmir and head of the "Beit Yaakov Rebi" Yeshiva. After Rabbi Mayo's death, he served as the sole leading rabbi. One of his judicial colleagues was Rabbi Rahamim Aryeh Abraham Cohen Aryash.

=== Activity in the Land of Israel ===
In 1813, Chazan made aliyah to the Land of Israel and settled in Hebron with his student, Rabbi Bechor Esturgo, and served as head of the rabbinical court for several years. After the death of Rabbi Yaakov Korall, the Rishon LeZion, in 1818, Chazan succeeded him in Jerusalem. He was joyously welcomed by the Hebron rabbis and celebrated by the Jewish community in Livorno, who lit synagogue lamps in his honor.

His wife Reina died in 1827. Chazan was also knowledgeable in Kabbalah and respected by Ashkenazi communities. He answered numerous Torah-related questions from various places, including inquiries from the students of the Vilna Gaon in Galilee. An incident is recounted where Chazan cursed a man who drank milk milked by a non-Jew, leading to the man's death shortly after.

Despite his old age and illness, which prevented him from eating hard foods, Chazan remained dedicated to Torah study, expressing gratitude that his vision and ability to learn were unaffected. He died on 23 Cheshvan 1820, in the presence of his son, Rabbi Eliezer Chazan, and was buried in the Mount of Olives Jewish Cemetery in Jerusalem.

== Descendants ==
His four sons, Elijah Rachamim, Eliezer, Isaac, and Chaim David, were all rabbinical scholars; one of his daughters became the mother of Ḥayyim Palaggi, chief rabbi of Smyrna. Another grandson was the Italian rabbi Israel Moses Hazan.

== Works ==
- Ḥiqre Leb, responsa (vol. i., Salonica 1787, linked here; vol. ii., Livorno 1794; vols. iii.-viii., Salonica 1806–53)
- Ma'arkhe Leb, homilies (ib. 1821–22)
- Ḥiqre Leb, Talmudic novellæ, edited by his great-grandson, Elijah (Jerusalem, 1880): one volume linked here

== Jewish Encyclopedia bibliography ==
- Solomon Hazan, Ha-Ma'alot li-Shelomoh, p. 43;
- Elijah Hazan, Zikron Yerushalayim, p. 131, Livorno 1874;
- La Buena Esperanza, Smyrna, 1896;
- Franco, Essai sur l'Histoire des Israélites de l'Empire Ottoman, etc., p. 127.
