= Azriel Zelig Hausdorf =

Polish-born philanthropist (1826–1905)

Rabbi Azriel Zelig Hausdorf
- עזריאל זליג הויזדורף
- Born: 1826; Myslovitz, Upper Silesia
- Died: 1905 (aged 78–79); Jerusalem, Ottoman Empire
- Organization: Kollel Hod
- Spouse: Hana Lipsha Minsker
- Relatives: Natasha Hausdorff

Rabbi Azriel Zelig Hausdorf (Hebrew: עזריאל זליג הויזדורף; 1826–1905) was a Zionist and doctor who worked with the Kollel Hod to build shelters in Jerusalem for Jewish immigrants.

== Early life ==
Hausdorf was born in 1826 to Moshe Hausdorf in the city of Myslovitz in Upper Silesia (now Poland). Due to his place of birth, he was sometimes called "Rabbi Zelig Deutsch" (Rabbi Zelig the German). He studied in the local Yeshiva of Rabbi Pinchas Hamburger, while concurrently receiving a secular education. In 1846, he immigrated to Jerusalem via boat over the Mediterranean. During the trip, due to unstable weather, the boat was at risk of capsizing, so the captain of the ship asked Hausdorf to pray for the boat like Jonah the prophet. He settled in the city and married Hana Lipsha Minsker, daughter of Rabbi Zvi of Vilna.

== Career ==
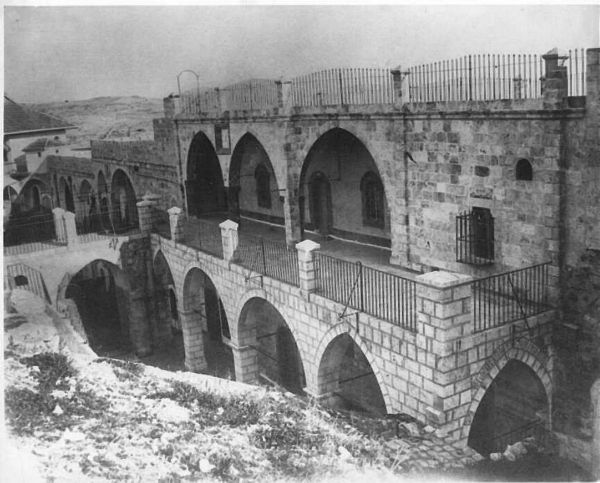
The southern building of the Batei Mahse, 1930s

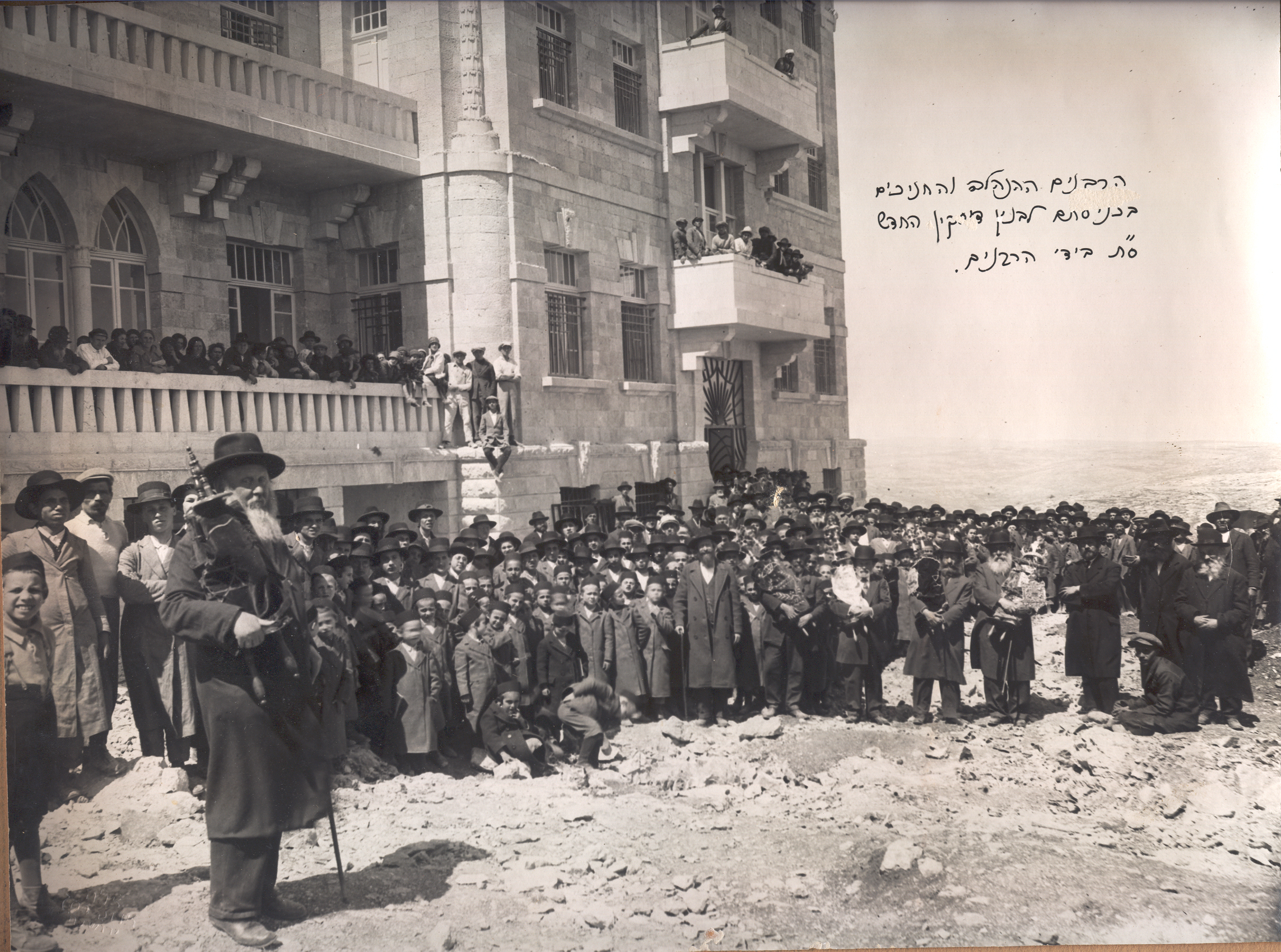
Diskin Orphanage, 1927

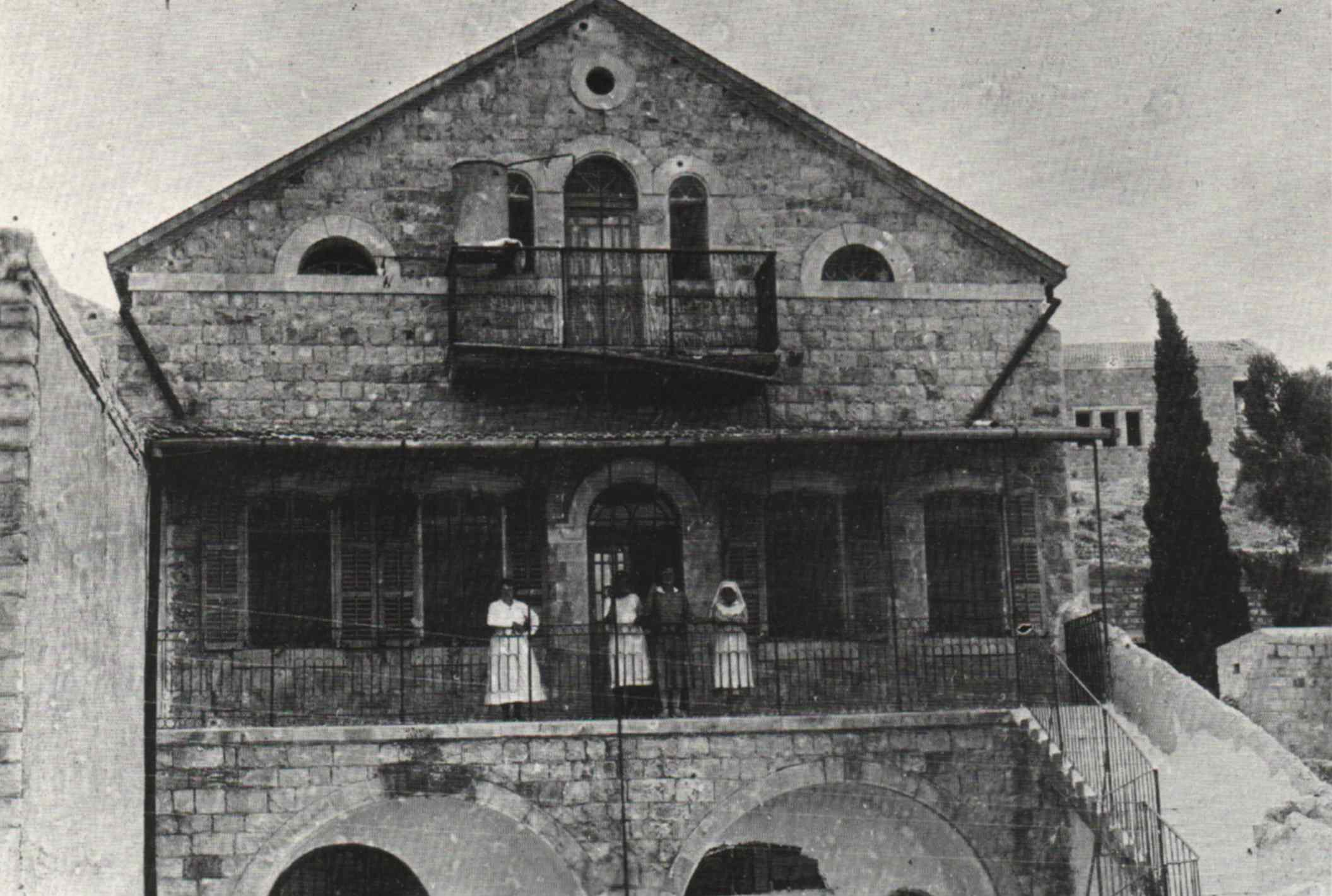
Misgav Ladach, 1915

Although in the beginning Hausdorf received aid from the Kollel Hod, he later became one of the leaders of the organization. He worked as an interpreter at the Austrian embassy in Jerusalem. He was one of the initiators of the 'shelter and hospitality' project established by his Kollel in the Old City of Jerusalem. To raise money to build shelters he went to Europe in 1858 and collected donations from Jews who wanted to support settlement in Ottoman Palestine. One of these shelters included the Batei Mahse.

In the summer of 1876, there was a pestilence of locusts in Palestine, as well as a drought, so Hausdorf supported the community by working with the Yehuda and Israel Society, established by Rabbi Chaim Tzvi Schneerson, with the goal of storing grain to ensure food security for the poor in Jerusalem for the coming winter. During the cholera epidemic in Jerusalem, he also helped to buy flour to distribute to the poor. He also volunteered for the Diskin Orphanage in the Old City.

Hausdorf was an important voice in the construction of the Misgav Ladach hospital built by the Rothschild family in Jerusalem, and was appointed overseer of the hospital's finances. Before its construction, the initial plan was to build it in Tiberias, and in 1865, he visited the city for that purpose. He also helped Charles Netter in his quest to purchase land for the Mikveh Israel youth village and boarding school.

He was one of the chief organizers for many receptions held on behalf of Jews for distinguished guests who came to Jerusalem, such as Moses Montefiore, Baron Edmond James de Rothschild, Rudolf of Austria, and Emperor Franz Joseph. Emperor Wilhelm II even gifted him a gold medal, the Knight's Medal of the Prussian Kingdom, as Hausdorf was authorized by the Prussian embassy to act as a defense attorney for a Jew in a criminal trial. They wrote on 14 April 1866 to his superiors:

There are no editors in Jerusalem law, and it is impossible to find a suitable person who meets the requirements of Prussian law as a defense attorney, so [Wilhelm] asks the authority to appoint someone as defense council for trials involving a leader of the Jewish community, who represents them and will interpret their requests.

For multiple years, he was reelected to his position. Throughout his career, he also helped protect Jews from proselytization from Christian missionaries and forces who were disapproving of Jewish practices in Palestine.

== Family ==
Rabbi Hausdorf had a total of 13 children, but only 3 survived into adulthood:

- His son Mordechai Shlomo was among the founders of Petah Tikva and Hausdorf provided the colony funding.
- His other son, Rabbi Chaim Eliezer, was a pharmacist and authored multiple books, including one about his father.
- His daughter Friedel was the wife of Rabbi Tuvia Aryeh Goldberger, a member of the Kollel Shomrei HaChomos.

He is a paternal ancestor of Natasha Hausdorff, a British barrister, international law commentator, and Israel advocate.

The municipality of Jerusalem named a street after him (Azriel Street) in the Givat Shaul neighborhood. He is buried at the Mount of Olives.

== Sources ==
- Pinchas Greivsky, booklet 7 of Magnazi Jerusalem (1839), pp. 11-14.
- Edelstein, Yehuda (11 Aug 1967). "בניין ירושלים לפני 100 שנה - הקונסוליה הפרוסית ממליצה על "בתי מחסה"". Hayom (in Hebrew).
- Klausner, Israel (1973). רבי חיים צבי שניאורסון : ממבשרי מדינת ישראל (in Hebrew). Jerusalem: Mossad Harav Kook.
