= Tuvia Aryeh Goldberger =

Rabbinic dayan (1856–1910)

Tuvia Aryeh Goldberger טוביה אריה גולדברגר
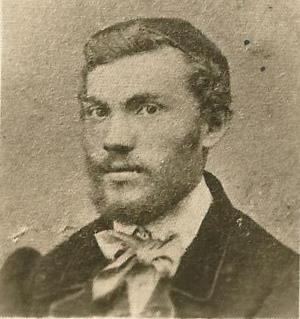

Personal life
- Born: 1856 Hungary
- Died: December 30, 1910 (aged 53/54) Jerusalem, Ottoman Empire
- Spouse: Freindel Hausdorf
- Children: 2
- Dynasty: Chabad (member)

Religious life
- Religion: Judaism
- Denomination: Hasidic

Jewish leader
- Synagogue: Badatz Kollel Hasidim in Jerusalem
- Organisation: Kollel Shomrei HaChomos
- Dynasty: Chabad (member)

Rabbi Tuvia Aryeh Goldberger (Hebrew: טוביה אריה גולדברגר; 1856 – December 30, 1910) was a dayan at the Badatz Kollel Hasidim in Jerusalem.

== Life ==
Goldberger was born in Hungary, where he studied under Rabbi Amram Blum. In 1873, at the age of 17, he immigrated to Eretz Yisroel and served as one of the heads of the Hungarian Kollel for 23 years, along with Rabbi Yosef Chaim Sonnenfeld and Rabbi Moshe Nachman Wallenstein. After Shneur Zalman Fradkin immigrated to Jerusalem, Goldberger eagerly studied at his beit midrash. Fradkin established Badatz Kollel Hasidim in Jerusalem, and Goldberger was subsequently appointed Dayan of its Beit din. He served on the court alongside Lipman David Shubkes and Yosef Yehuda Strasberg. After Fradkin's death in 1902, Goldberger was replaced by Avraham HaCohen, because Goldberger was a Litvak. He published the book Torat Chessed on himself and Fradkin's writings following the death of his son, threatening Hasidim with the possibility of permanently losing many of his writings.

He died on Friday, December 30, 1910 in Jerusalem, and was buried there. The newspaper HaZvi reported:

"Friday 29 Kislev was a day of mourning for many members of the Jewish community in Jerusalem because one of the elders of the distinguished community, Rabbi Tuvia Goldberger, passed away. He was for many years the director of Kollel Ungaria, excellent in good measures. And he was there night and day in Torah and Talmud. A funeral was declared on behalf of the Rabbinate and a very large crowd came to pay their last respects to him, and eulogizers properly eulogized him. Tantzba"

== Family ==
Goldberger was the son-in-law of Rabbi Azriel Zelig Hausdorf through his daughter Freindel; Hausdorf was one of the members of the organization that established the Batei Mahse complex in the Old City. His uncle was Nathan Yosef Goldberger, a teacher at Etz Chaim Yeshiva in Jerusalem.

His pedigree is as follows:

- Sarah (m. Aharon Simcha Blumenthal, son of Yaakov Blumenthal and Leah Wojnar)
  - Chana Blumenthal (m. Rabbi Yaakov Goldman)
    - Tuvia Goldman, a member of the Harel Brigade (m. Ahuva Pravda)
      - Ehud (m. Sue Sachs)
      - Hanna Yehudit
      - Naora (m. Yaron Rabinovitz)
      - Erez (m. Sarah Grossman)
      - Yael (m. Eliyahu Amichai)
      - Esther (m. Nissim Baruch, Director General of Finance and Director General of the National Insurance Institution of Israel)
- Esther Rachel d. 1968 (m. Rabbi Shimon Blumenthal)
