= Pump Court =

Courtyard in Temple, London

Coordinates: 51.5129°N 0.1110°W

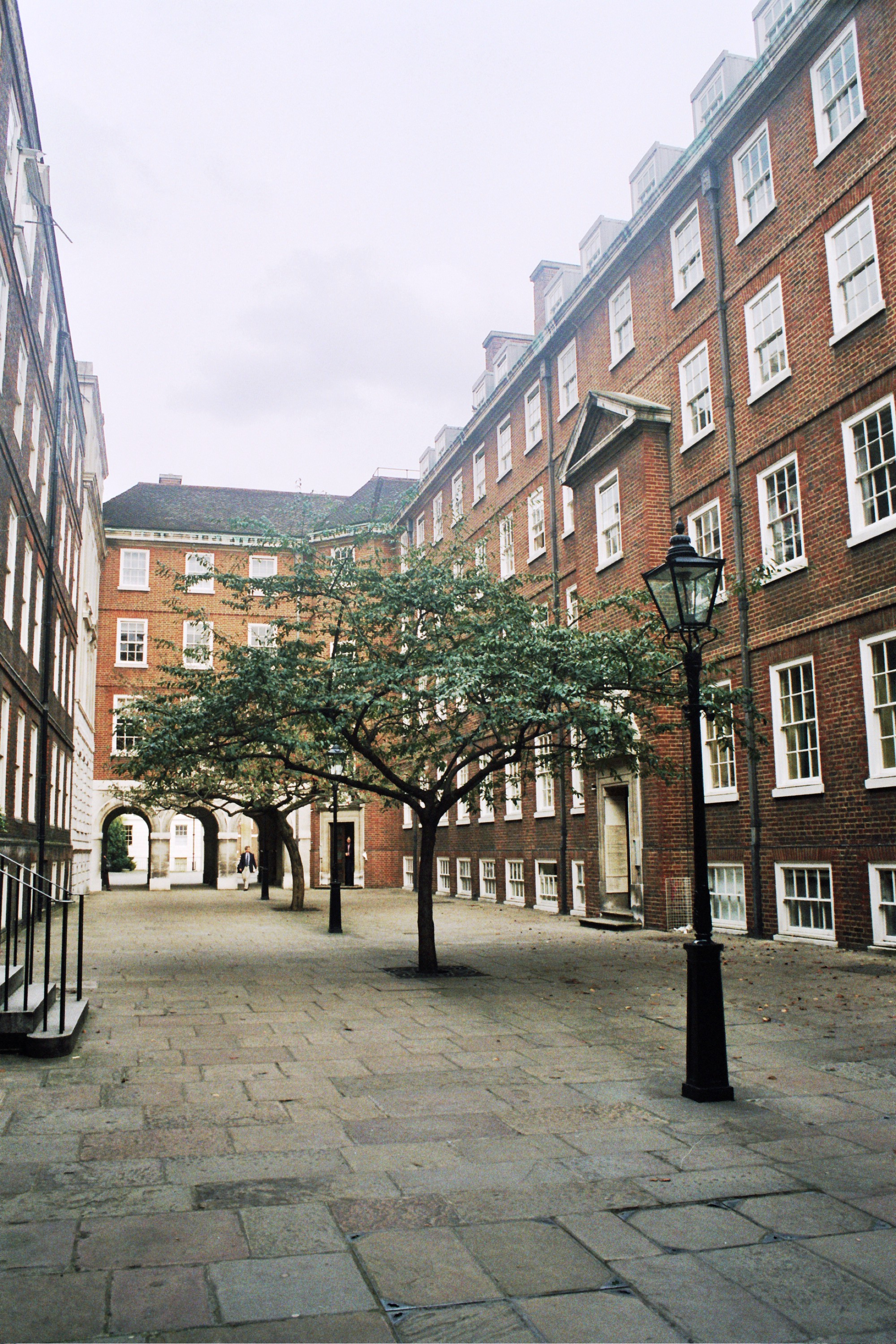
Pump Court, Temple, London

Pump Court is a courtyard in Temple, London, in the City of London, England, now primarily housing barristers' chambers. It is the first on the left in Middle Temple Lane from 6 Fleet Street, leading to Inner Temple Lane and Lamb's Buildings. Its name referred to the pump in the middle.

In the year following 1 Car 1 (1625), brick buildings were erected in the Pump Court. In 1637 (13 Car 1), the rest of the brick buildings in the Pump Court were set up.

Many famous figures have lived in Pump Court, including William Blackstone, William Cowper, Henry Fielding, Lord Russell of Killowen and Viscount Alverstone, his successor as Lord Chief Justice of England. There is a sundial with a motto that reads "shadows we are and like shadows depart" to remind the residents of the ephemeral character of their occupancy. This sundial was put up in 1686, and there is an entry in the accounts in respect of it which reads "25th Nov. 1686 Sun Dial in Pump Court £6. 5. 0." It is renovated periodically, and on each of these occasions it was customary for the year and the initials of the Treasurer for the time being to be placed in the centre of the dial. It was restored in 1861. After it was renovated and repainted in 1903, the inscription in the centre read "T. Sir R. B. F. 1903" the Treasurer of the Middle Temple for that year being the Attorney General, Sir Robert Finlay. The insignia of the Middle Temple, the Lamb and Flag, "stood out very boldly" in gold at the top, and the motto was at the bottom. The inscription in the centre was subsequently replaced with "T O M 1686".

== 1 Pump Court ==
Joseph Chitty the elder trained in succession in his pupil room here "a great number of the most eminent lawyers".

The Filazers', Exigenters' and Clerk of the Outlawries' Office for the Court of King's Bench was here. These officers were so called from the French word Fil, or thread, because they filed or threaded the writs. Thomas Kenyon was Filazer, Exigenter and Clerk of the Outlawries, and Andrew Edge was Filazer for Essex and Monmouthshire.

== 3 Pump Court ==
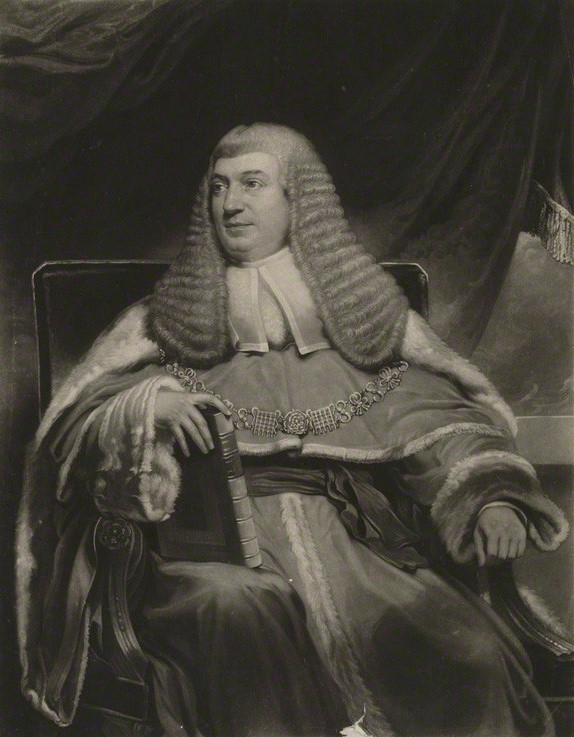
William Draper Best

The Warrant of Attorney Office was here. This was an address by William Draper Best MP. This is now home to the Chambers of Oba Nsugbe QC SAN and has been a western circuit set of barristers chambers since approximately 1943. It now comprises 99 barristers and 12 clerks.

== 4 Pump Court ==
Henry Fielding lived here.

== 5 Pump Court ==
5 Pump Court Chambers is one of the oldest established barristers' chambers in London. It has been in continuous existence since 1870. It now comprises 57 barristers and 8 clerks.

Morris Simeon Oppenheim had chambers here, where he committed suicide on 3 January 1883.

== 6 Pump Court ==
6 Pump Court Chambers specializes in environmental law, international arbitration, planning, health and safety law and all other types of regulatory law, as well as all forms of criminal law, civil law, employment and family law. It is ranked as a Band 1 set in the leading UK directories. Its barristers have included Judge William Aldous, Judge Douglas Falconer, Natasha Hausdorff, Judge Michael Hyam, and Justice Christina Lambert. Members of Chambers appear before all levels of courts.

== References and sources ==
Sources

- Bellot, Hugh. The Inner and Middle Temple: Legal, Literary, and Historic Associations. Methuen & Company. 1902. Google Books. Internet Archive.
- "Notes on Pump Court" (1935), The Law Times, Vol. 180, pp. 279 & 317. Google Books
- Richardson, John. "Fire at the Middle Temple" in The Annals of London. University of California Press. 2000. Page 155.
