= Natasha Hausdorff =

British barrister (born 1989)

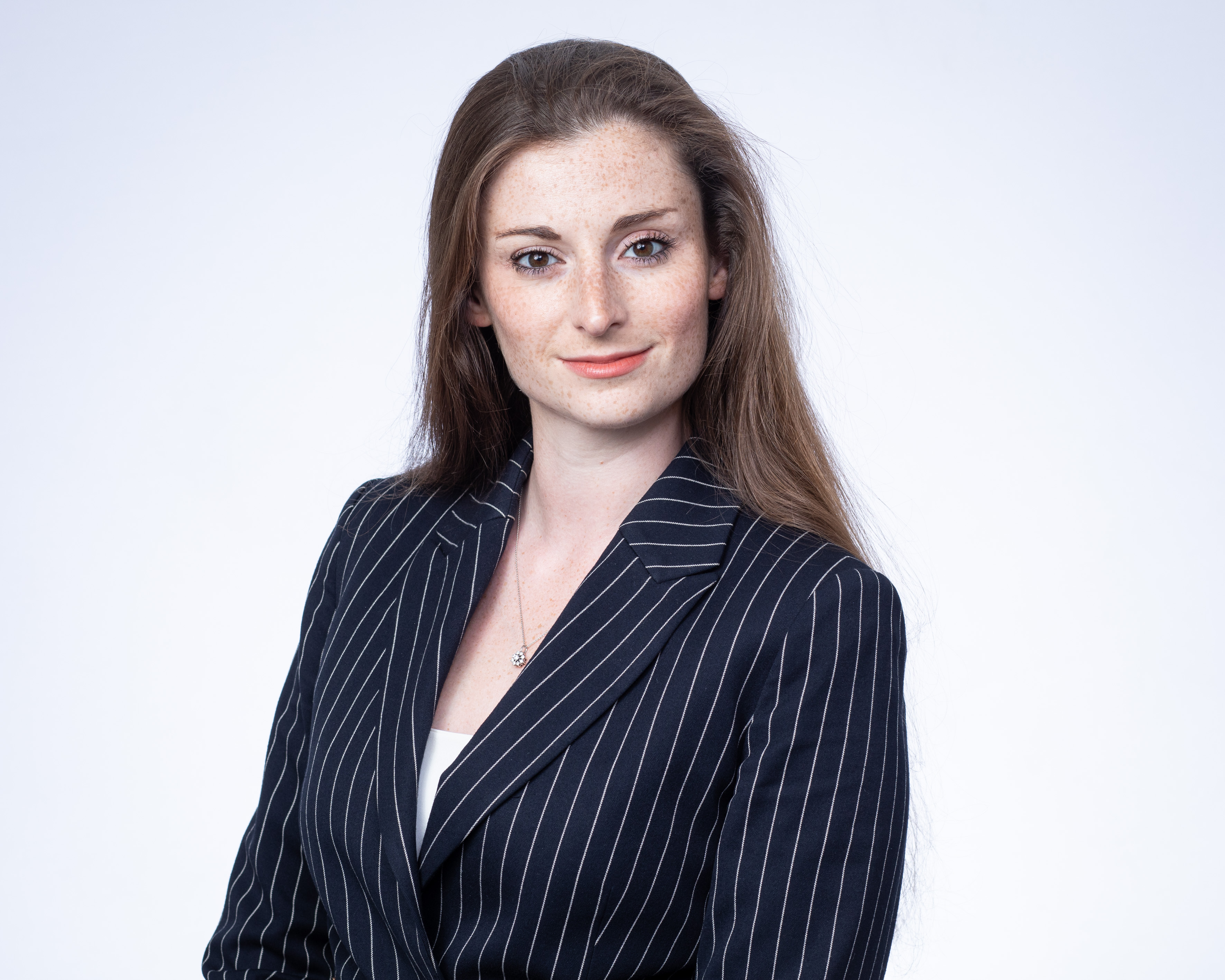
- Natasha Hausdorff in 2022
- Born: October 1989 (age 37)
- Citizenship: British
- Education: Oxford University (Lincoln College); Tel Aviv University; Columbia Law School
- Occupation: Barrister
- Years active: 2013–present
- Employer: 6 Pump Court Chambers
- Organization: UK Lawyers for Israel
- Relatives: Azriel Zelig Hausdorf

Natasha Hausdorff (born October 1989) is a barrister, and pro bono legal director of the advocacy group, UK Lawyers for Israel.

She is a barrister with 6 Pump Court Chambers in London. A graduate of Oxford University and Tel Aviv University, Hausdorff practised with the law firm Skadden, Arps, Slate, Meagher & Flom, and clerked for the chief justice of the Israeli Supreme Court. She was a former fellow at Columbia Law School in the National Security Law Program.

== Ancestry and education ==
Hausdorff grew up in Kensington and Chelsea in London, England. She attended the Godolphin and Latymer School in Hammersmith, West London. She is fluent in German.

Her Israeli father was born in Tel Aviv, and her parents met in Israel. According to Hausdorff, her family "goes back eight generations in the Land of Israel". She is a descendant on her father's side of Zionist philanthropist Azriel Zelig Hausdorf.

Hausdorff has law degrees from Oxford University and Tel Aviv University, from which she graduated with an LL.M. in international public law. In 2018, as a Pegasus Scholar, she was a Fellow in the National Security Law Program at Columbia Law School.

== Career ==
Hausdorff specialises in commercial, regulatory and international law, and has been a barrister with 6 Pump Court Chambers in London since 2016. Before coming to the Bar, Hausdorff qualified as a solicitor in 2015, with the United States multinational commercial law firm Skadden, Arps, Slate, Meagher & Flom, with whom she practised in London and Brussels from 2013 to 2015. Hausdorff clerked for the president of the Israeli Supreme Court in Jerusalem, Chief Justice Miriam Naor, from June until August 2016.

Hausdorff's practice includes commercial litigation, arbitration, regulatory matters, and public international law. She represents domestic and international clients, including private companies and government departments, both as sole counsel and junior to leading counsel.

== Israel advocacy ==
On a volunteer pro bono basis, Hausdorff is the legal director of UK Lawyers for Israel Charitable Trust. She speaks for Israel on a pro bono basis, and has spoken about the international law that applies to the status of the territory of Israel, and the rule of customary international law of uti possidetis juris. Hausdorff has taken part in Intelligence Squared live debates, and has spoken at the University of Cambridge, the University of Oxford, University College Dublin, Trinity College Dublin, and Durham University.

=== Commentary ===
Hausdorff has appeared as a commentator on legal matters for international media, including the BBC, Sky News, Talk TV, Fox News, CNN, and GB News. She has also written for The Telegraph, The Sunday Telegraph, The Times, The Spectator, The Law Society Gazette, and The Algemeiner. She has briefed politicians and international organisations, and has spoken at European parliaments and at the United Nations. Hausdorff has been a keynote speaker on aspects of public international law, foreign affairs, and national security policy.

=== Submissions ===
Hausdorff has made submissions to the Irish, Czech, and UK parliaments. She was quoted by Howard Darryl Leigh in Hansard. On 24 April 2024, she gave evidence to the Business and Trade Committee of the House of Commons of the United Kingdom on the "relevant legal, political and military issues impacting UK arms exports to Israel".

The UKLFI warned International Criminal Court prosecutor Karim Khan not to issue arrest warrants for Benjamin Netanyahu and Yoav Gallant. In 2024, Hausdorff participated in a panel at the 79th United Nations General Assembly High-Level Week, focusing on proportionality in armed conflict.

=== Debating ===
At university, Hausdorff was active in debate. In June 2024, she partnered with Douglas Murray at the Munk Debate in Toronto, debating against Mehdi Hasan and Gideon Levy, in favour of the motion that antisemitism and anti-Zionism are the same; 61% of the audience already agreed with this before the debate, and 66% after.

In November 2024, she participated in a debate at Oxford University. The Oxford Union ended up voting for the proposition that "Israel is an apartheid state that is committing genocide" with 278 votes for and 59 votes against.

=== Recognition ===
In October 2024, The Jerusalem Post named Hausdorff the #2 young "2024 ViZionary," that being the #2 most influential young Zionist, and a "prominent advocate for Israel's legal rights on the global stage". Hausdorff lit a torch on Israel's 77th Independence Day in recognition of her advocacy on behalf of Israel.

== Views ==
=== "Lawfare" ===
Hausdorff has stated that because Israel's opponents had concluded that warfare and terror attacks had not achieved their goal of eliminating the state, they had taken a different approach to attack Israel in the international legal arena. She has referred to this as lawfare, the abuse of the law for political means. She is of the opinion that many of the charges brought against Israel before international bodies such as the International Criminal Court (ICC), the International Court of Justice (ICJ), and the United Nations Human Rights Council (UNHRC) are based on falsehoods and the manipulation of international law. She said that even though these cases may not ultimately be successful, those bringing the false charges do so for the public relations agenda they pursue, as they generate negative media attention about Israel. She believes as well that "lawfare" discredits "real international law and generates a double standard concerning the Jewish state".

==== ICJ ruling ====
In January 2024, Hausdorff discussed the International Court of Justice (ICJ) ruling, explaining that this provisional measures order by the Court simply determined whether South Africa claimed "plausible rights", namely whether it raised a case that engaged the Genocide Convention and therefore fell for the consideration of the Court. She said that the "provisional measures" that the court said Israel was obligated to undertake were those that Israel was clear it was already in compliance with. Hausdorff also addressed the quotes that South Africa had advanced as part of its case alleging "incitement to genocide comments", which she says had been misrepresented and manipulated, including by South Africa allegedly having left out context which supposedly demonstrated the quotations referred to Hamas.

==== ICC ====
Speaking in May 2024 about International Criminal Court (ICC) prosecutor Karim Khan having requested the issuance of arrest warrants against Israeli prime minister Benjamin Netanyahu and defense minister Yoav Gallant for war crimes and crimes against humanity in the Gaza Strip, she said that the ICC did not have jurisdiction because Israel is not a signatory of the Rome Statute.

==== United Nations Human Rights Council ====
Hausdorff has said that the United Nations Human Rights Council (UNHRC) has a Standing Agenda Item 7 covering "Human rights violations and implications of the Israeli occupation of Palestine and other occupied Arab territories", and has alleged that no other country in the world is subjected by the UNHRC to a stand-alone focus on the UNHRC permanent agenda. She also said that the so called "UN blacklist" of firms singles out Israeli companies and companies operating in the Israeli-occupied territories.

=== West Bank status ===
Hausdorff has reported that, in reference to the Palestinians, "Self-determination does not give one a right to a state in international law." She separately stated that it was Israel's position in 1967 that the West Bank was Israel's sovereign territory, and that it had the expectation that it would likely achieve peace with Jordan by giving Jordan some of the West Bank.

=== Gaza Health Ministry casualty figures ===
Hausdorff has been sceptical of the casualty figures coming from the Gaza Ministry of Health, claiming that inflated casualty numbers from the initial reports of the Al-Ahli Arab Hospital explosion were never reduced in the official tally. The Health Ministry additionally does not distinguish between civilians and combatants, she argues, as a way to obfuscate high combatant death counts.

=== Hezbollah pager attack ===
After the Hezbollah pager attack in September 2024, in which over 3,000 pagers intended for use by Hezbollah militants exploded simultaneously across Lebanon and Syria, Hausdorff said that if Israel was responsible, then on the information that was available the attack appeared to be "incredibly precise. Rules on targeting are principally necessity, distinction, and proportionality. It is hard to imagine a better means of targeting Hezbollah operatives."

== See also ==
- International Criminal Court investigation in Palestine#Decisions on jurisdiction
