= Kollel Hod =

19th-century Germanic-Jewish philanthropy organization

- Jewish Society of Holland and Deutschland
- כולל הו"ד
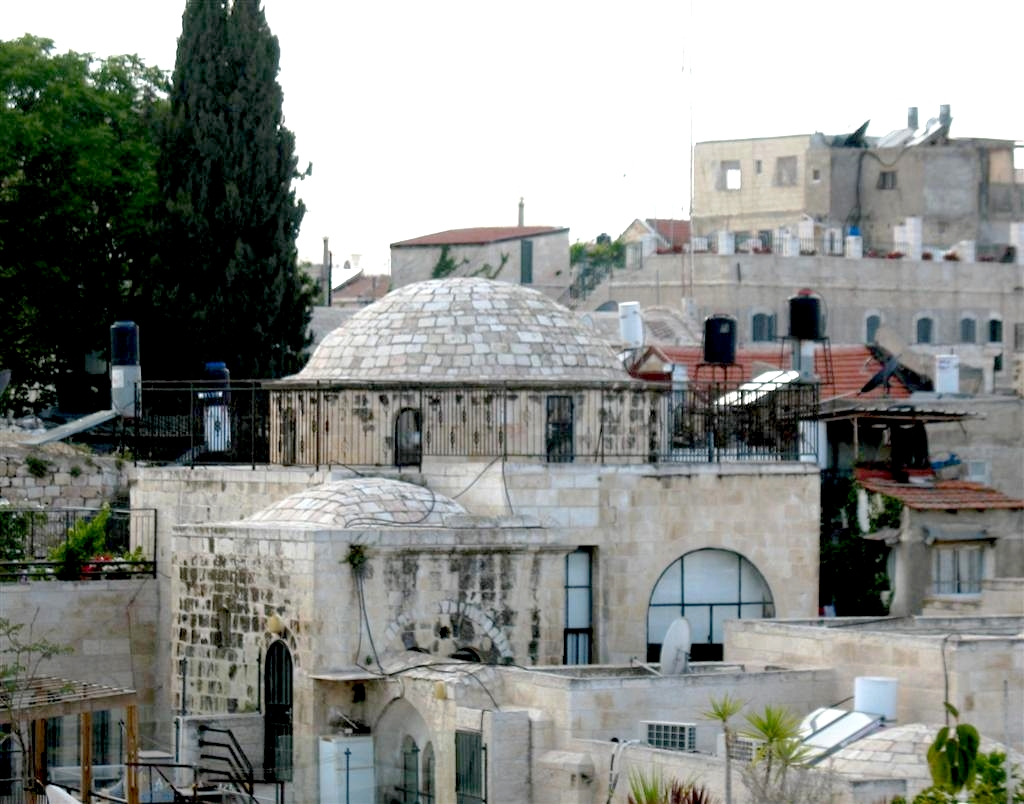
- Sukkat Shalom Synagogue, founded in the 1830s with funding from the organization
- Formation: 19th century
- Headquarters: Jerusalem
- Services: Philanthropy and funding for the Jewish community in Jerusalem
- Methods: International donations
- Official language: Hebrew

Kollel Hod (Hebrew: כולל הו"ד, lit. 'Jewish Society of Holland and Deutschland') was a Jewish community-building organization composed of Jews who had emigrated from the Netherlands and Germany to Ottoman Palestine in the 19th century.

== Background ==
In the Ottoman-controlled land of Palestine, particularly in Jerusalem, there were many associations for Jews who had emigrated from abroad and wanted to maintain ties with their countries of origin. The kollels were mainly a conduit for distribution money from international benefactors who donated money to support Jewish immigration to the Land of Israel. These organizations included the Kollel Hod, of Dutch and German Jewry, an organization representing the Jews of two countries who were exposed to much emancipation and social change during the Industrial Revolution, and were technologically further ahead than many Jews in Middle-eastern countries that had not yet caught up to the mechanical advancements of Western Europe.

== Composition of membership ==
A majority of members in the kollel were typically younger, more educated immigrations who immigrated to Israel to help build Jewish settlements. Consequently, many of them were local leaders in directing resources to help fund construction and growth in their communities. Messengers on behalf of Kollel Hod raised funds in Germany and Holland, as well as in immigrant communities of the Jewish-German diaspora in England, the United States, and Australia. These funds helped the Kollel maintain an independent presence outside of reliance on international backers, as they had members who would fundraise for them.

Members of the organization were typically respected by the local Turkish authorities and would assimilate in certain manners, such as dressing in traditional Turkish clothing.

Prominent members include:

- Moses Sachs (1800–1870)
- Nachman Nathan Coronel (1810–1890)
- Azriel Hildesheimer (1820–1899)

== History ==
The Kollel was founded in the 19th century, and grew to become the richest Jewish association in the Land of Israel, with more funding and members than the Sephardic settlement in the region. It grew further in the 1830s during the governance of Muhammed Ali Pasha. Although most of their efforts were focused in Jerusalem, they occasionally worked on projects in other cities, such as Petah Tivka.

Members of Kollel were the first to revolt in 1837 against division orders for Sephardic and Ashkenazi, Chasidic and Perushim communities in Jerusalem. They objected to the conservatism of philanthropists who demanded the separation and were generally against the mixing of various Jewish sects under fear that they would adopt modern philosophy conceived during The Enlightenment. The Committee of Officials and Treasurers, who financed the majority of Ashkenazi projects in Jerusalem, often prevented Jews who received its money from going to certain secular businesses under worry that it would lead people astray of the teaching of the Sages to ideals of the Haskalah.

== Activities ==
The organization was responsible for helping found and maintain many institutions for Jews in Israel including the Shaare Zedek Hospital and the Lämel School.

=== Batei Mahse ===
Their most notable contribution in Jerusalem, Kollel Hod also was responsible for raising funds to build the Batei Mahse, a rent-controlled apartment complex in the Old City of Jerusalem for poor Jewish residents. Lots had been purchased in 1857. Because of nature of the organization, One third of the 100 apartments built were allocated to people of German and Dutch origin. Another third were also distributed to Jewish emigrants from Hungary. The complex's apartments were considered relatively spacious and luxuriant compared to the generally cramped living spaces within most parts of the Jewish Quarter in the Old City.
