= Moses Sachs =

German-Jewish meshulach (1800–1870)

- משה זקס
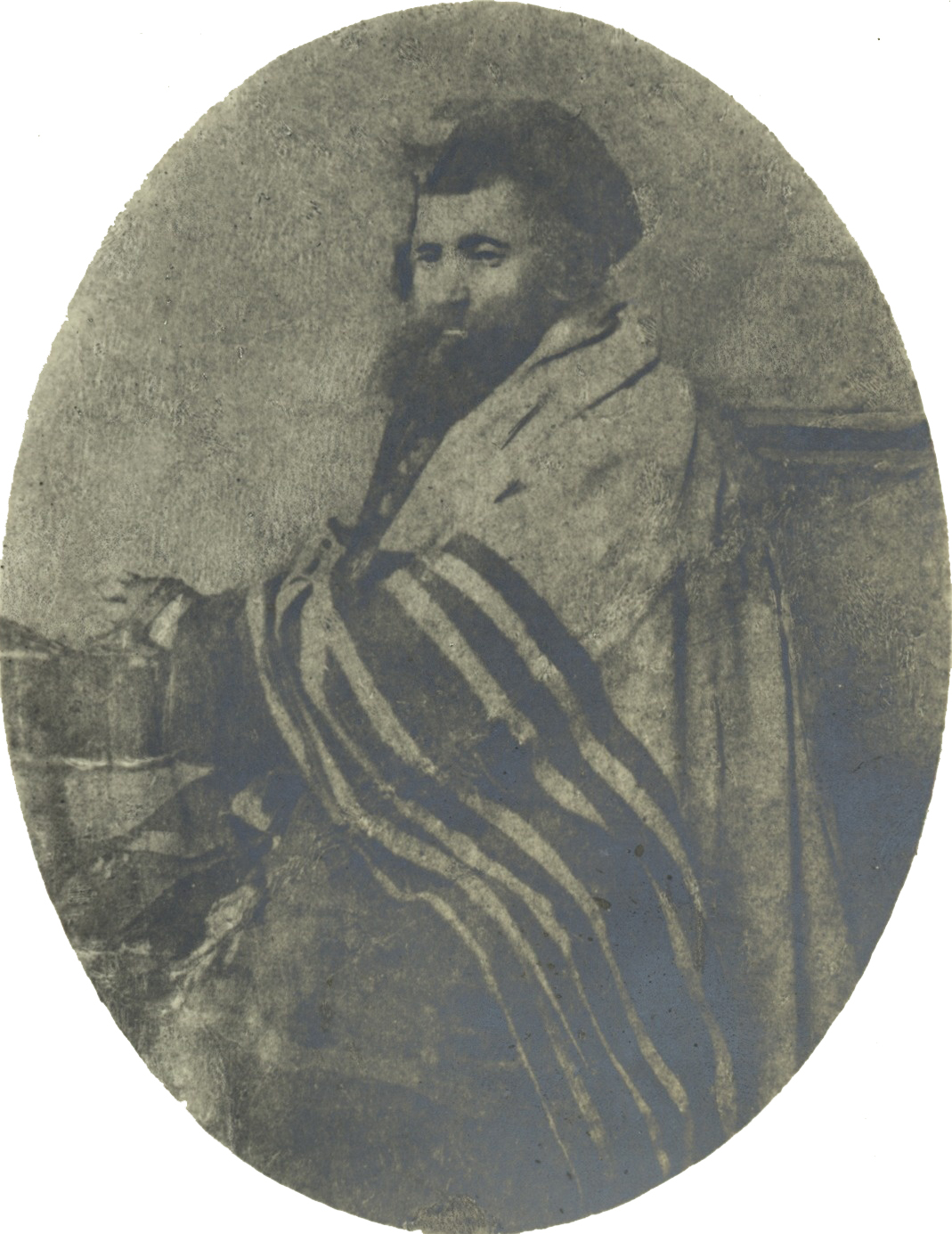
- Born: 1800; Dreißigacker, Duchy of Saxe-Meiningen
- Died: 5 July 1870 (aged 69–70); Jerusalem, Ottoman Palestine
- Occupation: Meshulach

Moses (Moshe) Sachs (1800 – 5 July 1870) was a Meshullach.

== Life ==
Sachs was born in Dreißigacker in the Duchy of Saxe-Meiningen. He studied under some of the leading rabbis of the time, among them were Rabbi Akiva Eger, Rabbi Jacob Lisser and Chacham Sofer.

In 1830 he immigrated to the Land of Israel and is considered the first German to do so in the 19th century. He settled in Jerusalem and in 1832 married Rachel, daughter of Rabbi Zadok HaLevi Cruiz (considered by locals the "Rothschild of Jerusalem").

In 1835 he went to Tunis as a Meshullach. There he met Prince Hermann von Pückler-Muskau who was impressed by him and recommended that he meet with Baron Salomon Mayer von Rothschild of Vienna. Sachs convinced Rothschild and a group of other wealthy Jews to back a program for the settling of Jews as farmers in the Land of Israel under Austrian protection. With the help of Archduke John of Austria the plan was submitted to the Austrian government which in turn had consul Stürmer present it to the Ottoman Empire. The Ottoman government refused and the plan failed.

Sachs remained in Europe until 1839. During this time he visited many communities in order to win support to the productivity plan and studied medicine and astronomy at the Ludwig-Maximilians-Universität München (LMU) for six months.

Sachs was opposed by the brothers Akiba and Hirsch Lehren of bankers who controlled the fundraising system in Europe and the distribution of funds to the Yishuv, the Jewish communities in the Land of Israel. They believed that the purpose of the Yishuv was hastening salvation by prayer and Torah study and thus found productivity dangerous.

In 1854 Sachs was a founding member of the first society for the settlement of the Land of Israel.

In 1860 he left again to Europe to collect contributions for the Batei Machse established by Kollel Holland veDeutschland. He remain there for five years.

In 1865 he returned to Jerusalem. He was involved in various public affairs and covered the events of the Yishuv in local and European newspapers.

Sachs saw the foundation of Mikveh Israel and died in 1870 in Jerusalem.
