= Douglas Falconer (judge) =

English judge (1914–2007)

Sir Douglas William Falconer, MBE (20 September 1914 – 18 December 2007) was an English barrister and High Court judge. A patent law specialist, he sat in the Chancery Division from 1981 to 1989.

== Biography ==
Douglas Falconer was born in South Shields in 1914, the son of William Falconer, an unemployed shipyard worker. He was educated at the local elementary school, before attending South Shields Grammar School on a scholarship. He then read Physics at King’s College, Durham, graduating with a BSc (Hons) in 1935. He became a teacher, first in either Leicester or Newcastle, then at Bromsgrove School.

On the outbreak of the Second World War, Falconer was commissioned in the East Yorkshire Regiment, fought with the British Expeditionary Force, and was among the last to be evacuated at Dunkirk. He played an important role in training and planning for D-Day, for which he was appointed a MBE (Military Division). He was demobilized with the rank of honorary Major.

After the war, Falconer returned to Bromsgrove School but decided to read for the Bar. He was called to the Bar by the Middle Temple in 1950. He completed his pupillage with Guy Aldous (the father of William Aldous, later Falconer's own pupil and a Lord Justice of Appeal) in the chambers of Kew Shelley at 6 Pump Court Chambers, where he remained for the remainder of his career at the bar. Building on his scientific background, he specialized in patent law. He became a Queen's Counsel in 1967 and a Bencher of the Middle Temple in 1973.

Falconer was joint editor of Terrell on the Law of Patents (11th edition, 1965; 12th edition, 1971). He was appointed to exercise the appellate jurisdiction of Board of Trade (later Department of Trade and Industry) under the Trade Marks Act from 1970 to 1981, and was a member of several governmental committees. Falconer succeeded Guy Aldous as head of chambers at 6 Pump Court in 1967, and remained head of chambers until his elevation to the bench. He was chairman of the Patent Bar Association from 1971 to 1980.

In 1981, Falconer was appointed to the High Court of Justice, receiving the customary knighthood. Assigned to the Chancery Division, he was known for his careful approach to judicial work. Conservative in his approach to the law, he commented during a trial that "I am all for innovation, but it has never been done before." He retired in 1989.

== Family ==
Falconer married Joan Beryl Argent in 1941; they had a son and a daughter. Lady Falconer died in 1989. He married secondly Constance Drew in 1997.
