= Batei Mahse =

Housing complex in the Old City of Jerusalem

- בתי מחסה
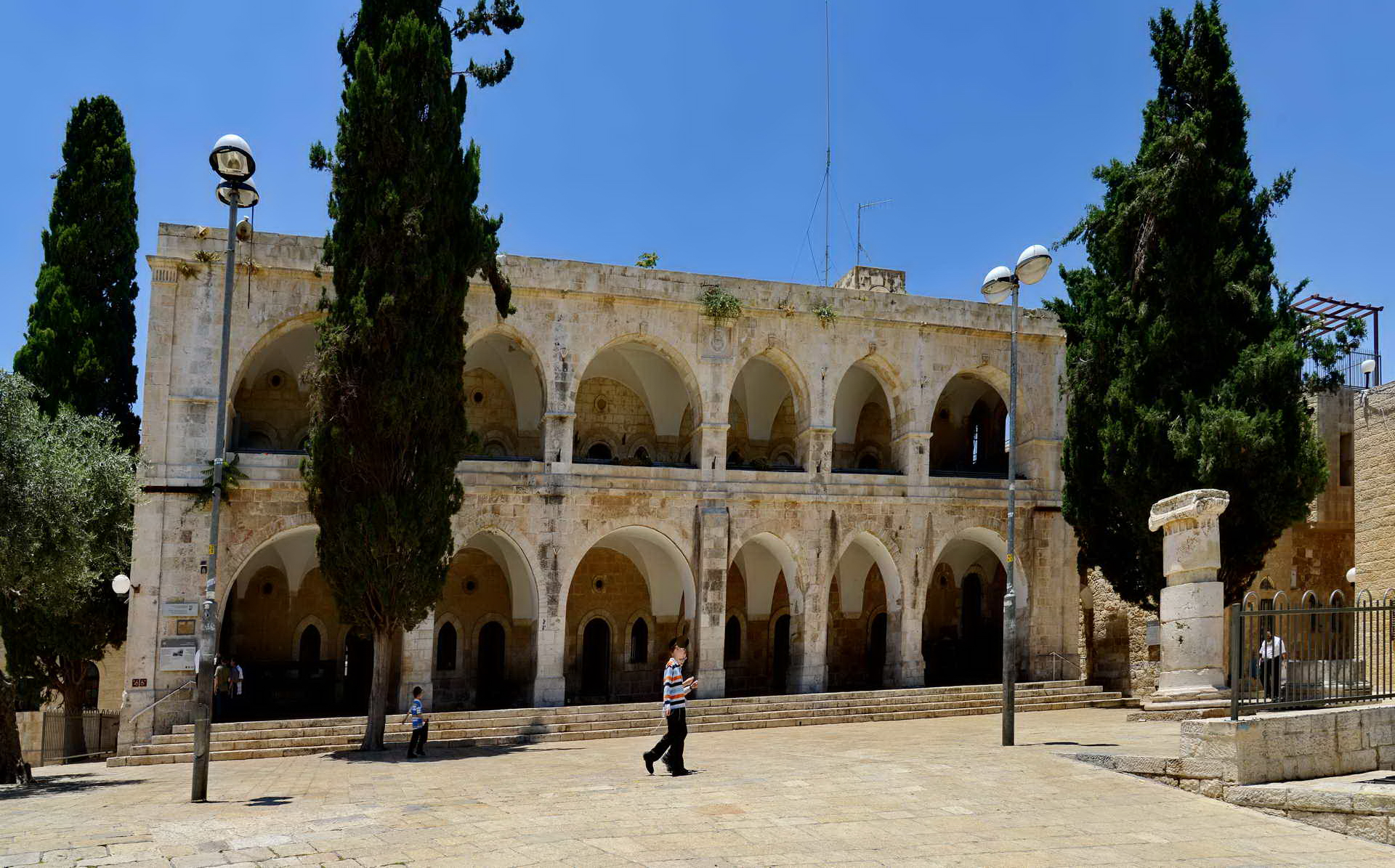
- Batei Mahse Square today

General information
- Address: Gilad 10, Jerusalem
- Town or city: Jerusalem
- Coordinates: 31.774542°N 35.232357°E
- Year(s) built: 1860-1890
- Renovated: After 1967

Design and construction
- Developer: Kollel Hod
- Known for: First housing cooperative in Israel

The Batei Mahse (Hebrew: בתי מחסה, lit. 'Shelter for the Needy') is an apartment complex built from 1857 to 1890 in the Jewish Quarter of the Old City of Jerusalem, intended to house the city's poorer residents.

== History ==
=== Construction ===
The complex is the first modern Jewish housing initiative built in the Land of Israel. The purpose of the building was to build shelters for poor residents (a kind of financial welfare). The initiative for its establishment was started by Kollel Hod, an organization founded by Jews from the Netherlands and Germany donating to the Jewish Quarter during the period of the Old Yishuv.

The construction of the complex enabled the community to grant apartments to poor families for a period of three years for free or for a controlled fee. At the end of the 19th century, housing prices rose in Israel, and many Jewish families found themselves unable to pay full rent to their landlords, leaving them homeless. The socio-economic situation led to the decision of Rabbi Azriel Hildesheimer to establish Kollel Hod for the establishment of the Mount Zion Toba Shelter Company for the Poor. The complex built included 100 apartments that were built to a fairly high standard of living compared to what was customary in Jerusalem at the time.

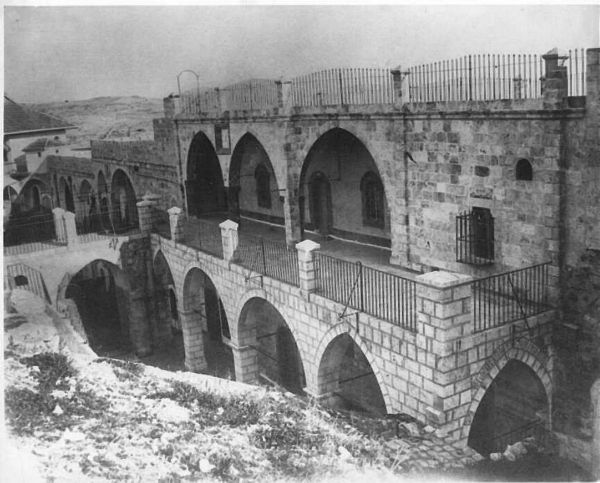
South building, 1930s

Funding for the construction of the building was obtained by various Meshulach, including: Moses Sachs, Chaim Tzvi Schneerson, and Azriel Zelig Hausdorf, who were sent over the diaspora to collect donations from Jews living in various countries, even as far away as Australia. A particularly donation was made by Baron Wilhelm Carl de Rothschild of Frankfurt.

Each apartment (numbered with an engraved lintel in Hebrew letters) consisted of two rooms and a kitchen, and in the center of the paved communal courtyard were large cisterns. Tenants who received an apartment were considered fortunate in the quarter, as many tried to make connections to get one. 1/3 of the apartments were distributed to Hungarian Jews, 1/3 to German and Dutch Jews, and 1/3 to poor Jews from other countries.

The original intention of the complex was to distribute the apartments to poor Torah scholars, however, 2/3 of the apartments were given to Hungarian and Germanic Jews who were not poor at all. David Yellin wrote on the subject, saying:

And when it is time to divide the houses among the poor Torah scholars in Jerusalem, the descendants of Hungary will jump to the top of the list, and the Germanic Jews will follow. It is true that the population of Hungarian Jews is lacking in this demographic... and among the children of Germany there are no poor, and in the many iniquities, even wealthy Torah scholars [are not found] among them, but finally here the origin of the money was in the homelands of these two kollels, well they decided... to divide the right to reside in these dwellings into 3 parts, 1/3 for the Hungarians, 1/3 for the Germanics, and 1/3 for the Kelal Yisrael and their poor in the lands of Hungary or Ashkenaz, who were not born into holiness and purity, including those of Israel: the Ashkenazim and Sephardim and the Westerners and the Yemenites and all the Jewish communities to his countries of exile.

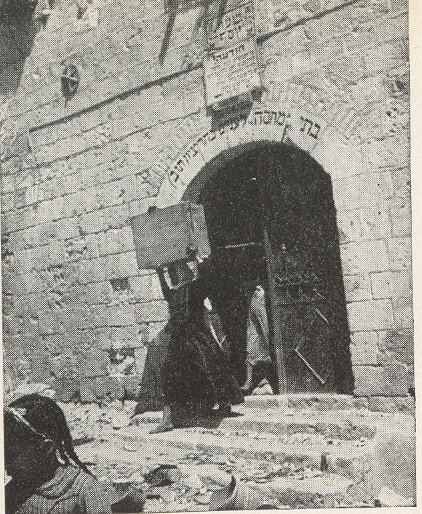
Complex looted by Arabs during the sieging of the Jewish Quarter

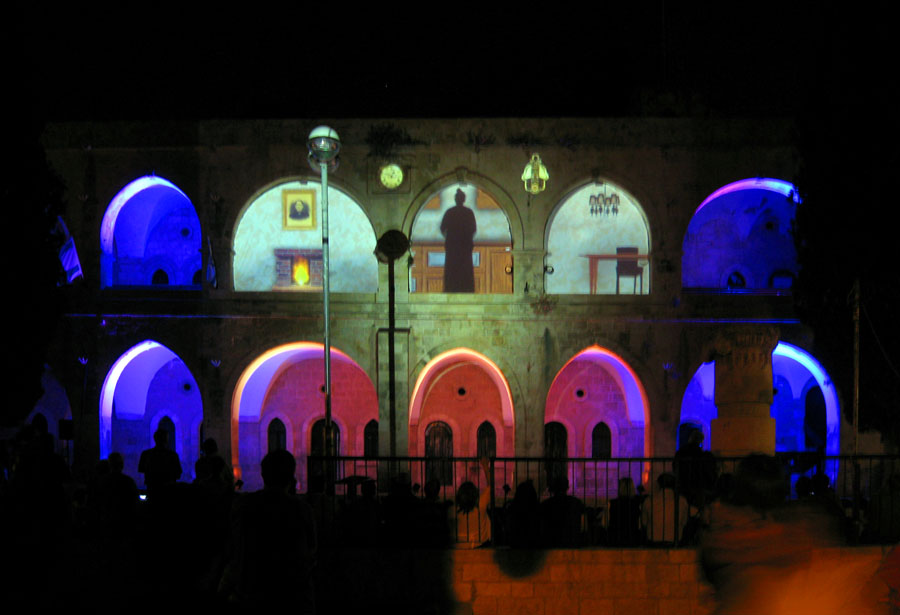
Batei during the "Light and Jerusalem" Festival, June 2009

=== Post-independence ===
The complex, located near the Old City wall, was the last courtyard left in control of the defenders of the Jewish Quarter when it fell during the 1948 Palestine war (with the central cellars used as shelter for Jews), and from the square in the compound, the defenders of the Quarter were taken captive by the Jordanian Legion. In the courtyard of the building, at the corner of Gilad Street, the bodies of those who died in combat were buried, since they could not be buried outside the walls of the besieged Quarter. The mass grave was erected with the approval of the Rabbi of the Western Wall and the Holy Places, Rabbi Yitzhak Avigdor Orenstein, despite the historical prohibition of burying the dead inside the Old City. The deceased were transferred on 4 August 1967 to a mass grave on the Mount of Olives, where they received a military burial and official tombstones.

After the Six-Day War, the compound was renovated. Some of the rubble was removed and new residential buildings were put in their place. The Rothschild House building was renovated and is now used as an office building and school.

== Beit Meir and Ohel Yitzhak Synagogue (1881) ==
A synagogue, Beit Meir and Ahel Yitzhak, was a spacious building in the southeast of the courtyard of the complex. It served as a synagogue for the community of German immigrants in the Jewish Quarter, inaugurated in 1881. It was named after Rabbi Meir ben Yitzhak Frenkel Eiseman, Rabbi in Weitzenhausen.

=== Background to establishment ===
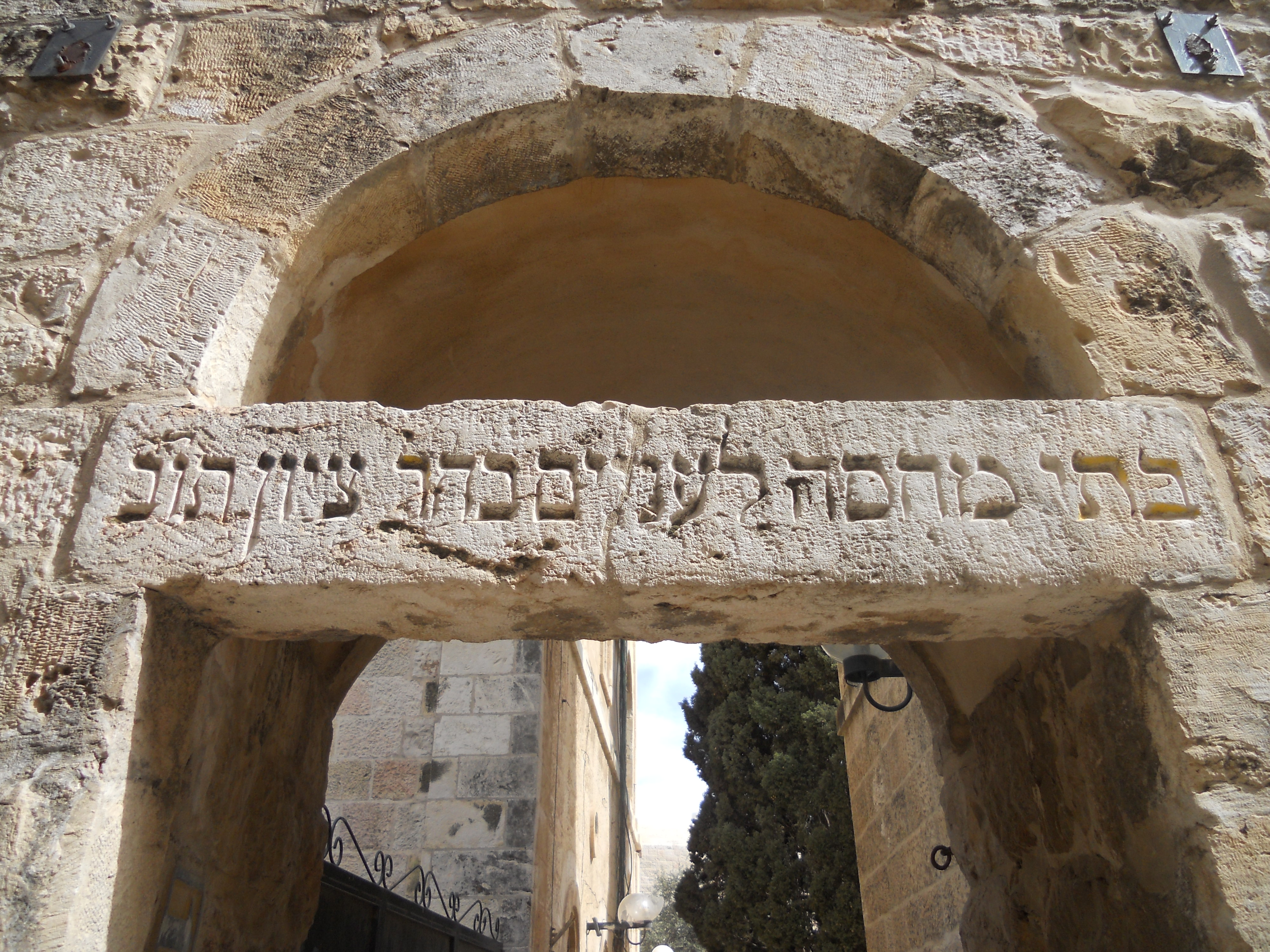
Entrance to Batei Mahse Square

By the middle of the 19th century, there was a plan to build a new synagogue in the Old City for German immigrants. For this purpose, a large sum of money was raised through donations by Rabbi Eiseman, but it was not enough to construct a synagogue. In his will in 1879, a considerable sum of money was allocated for the construction of a synagogue in the Batei Mahse, and a similar donation was made by him, bequeathing his personal Torah scrolls and library. Responsibility for executing the will was given to the directors of Kollel Hod, the establishers of Batei Mahse. Eiseman's wife and sons initially objected to the will, and only after a long back-and-forth did they agree to transfer the funds for their intended purpose. Construction of the synagogue began in 1880, during which 2 of the workers were killed.

During the month of Elul in 1881 (5641) the synagogue's dedication was held. the event was attended by Rabbi Shmuel Salant, and the Rishon LeZion, Raphael Meir Panigel.

=== Activity and destruction ===
The use of the synagogue commenced on Rosh Hashanah eve of 5641. Subsequently, a ritual bath was built near the synagogue, drawing water from one of the courtyard cisterns.

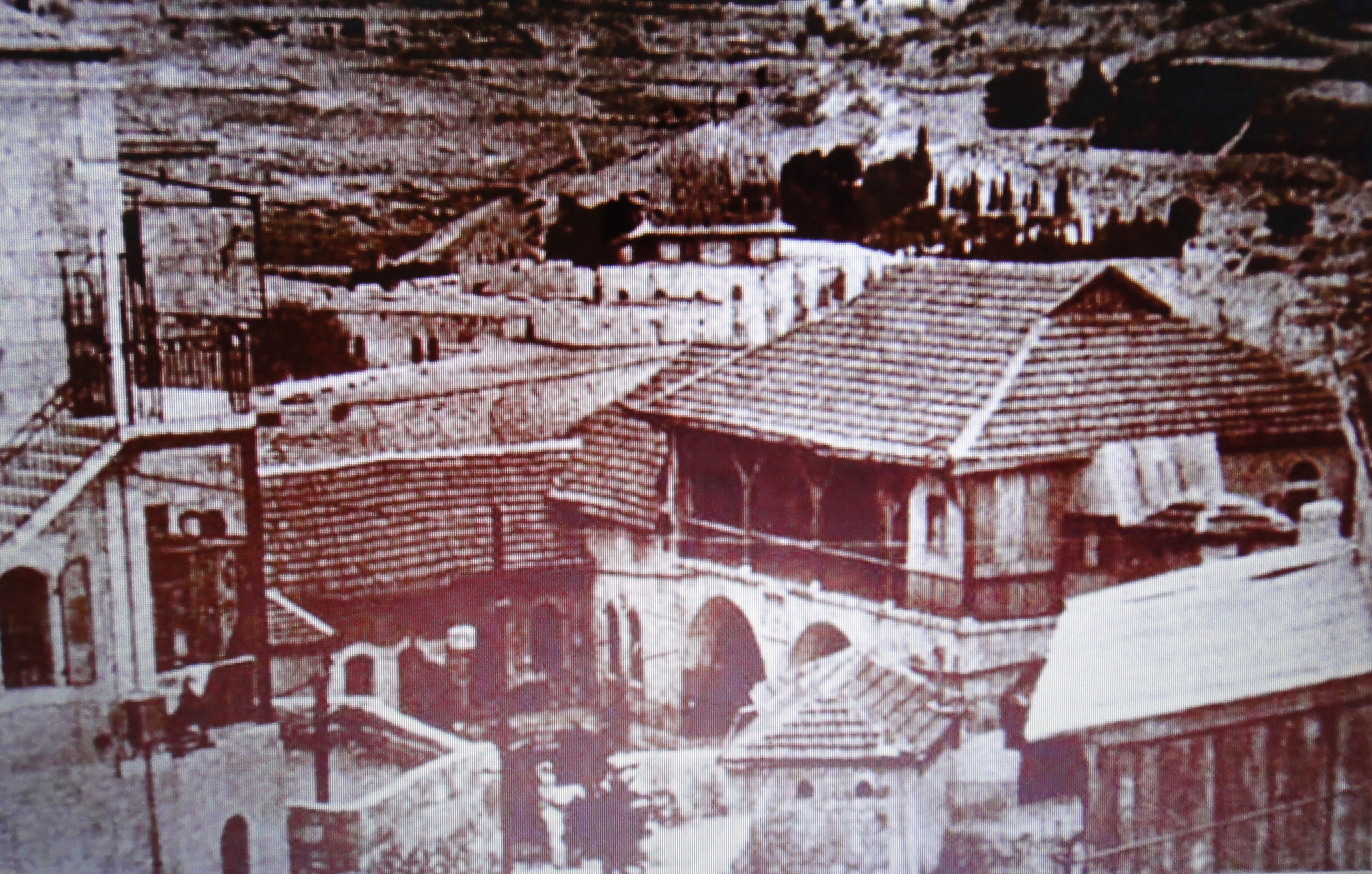
Synagogue from the outside

During the period that Jews were forbidden to read Torah at the Western Wall, worshippers used to come to Beit Meir to read the Torah. The synagogue served as one of main synagogues of the Old City. A description from the period reads:

The Synagogue is in the Batei Mahse of the Old City near the Cotel, every Shabbat the masses come from the Western Wall to this synagogue to read the torah, where the first minyan prays. Every day there is a Talmud and Ein Yaakov lesson between Mincha and Maariv. After Maariv prayers, all the children of the Old City gather for study. The synagogue serves as one of the centers of the Old City.

In 1948, after the conquest of the Jewish Quarter by the Jordanian Legion, the Arabs completedly destroyed the synagogue. Today, there are no remnants of the synagogue, nor is there any known photograph of its interior. Unlike other synagogues in the Old City destroyed during the War of Independence and rebuilt after the liberation of Jerusalem, such as the Hurva or Ohel Yitzhak, there have been no plans to rebuild the Beit Meir

== Rothschild House (1871) ==
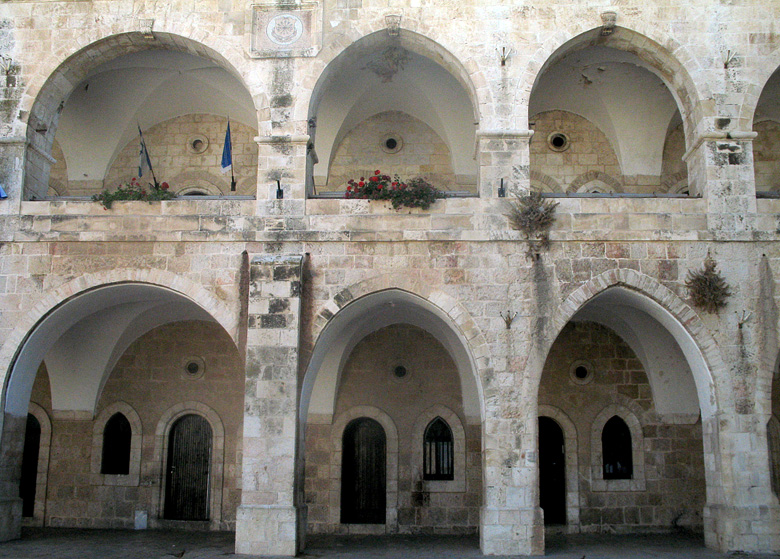
Façade to Rothschild house

The Rothschild House is a building that is part of the Batei complex, financed by Baron Rothschild, who was a devout jew and nicknamed "The Just Baron". The building is named after him, and on its façade is the family's coat of arms. The building has two floors, and each floor has six apartments. In between the apartments, there is a cross-vaulted covered hallway, and in contrast to other buildings, residents were allowed to live their whole lives in the house.

After the Six-Day War, the building was repaired and housed the offices of the Company for the Reconstruction and Development of the Jewish Quarter.

In 2001, the company sold the building to the "Ner LaRachel & Construction" association, which manages the Yeshivat Aderet Eliyahu, founded by Rabbi Yizhak Shlomo Zilberman. An appeal by a number of residents to the High Court of Justice against the sale stopped the transfer of the building. In 2009, the Court determined that the building was rightful property of Ner LaRachel. Today, the lower floor of the building houses the Yeshivat's Talmud Torah, and the upper floor houses are rented to the CRDJQ.
