= Chief Rabbi =

Religious leader of a country's Jews

Chief Rabbi (Hebrew: רַב רָאשִׁי, romanized: Rav Roshi) is a title given in several countries to the recognized religious leader of that country's Jewish community, or to a rabbinic leader appointed by the local secular authorities. Since 1911, through a capitulation by Ben-Zion Meir Hai Uziel, Israel has had two chief rabbis, one Ashkenazi and one Sephardi.

Cities with large Jewish communities may also have their own chief rabbis; this is especially the case in Israel but has also been past practice in major Jewish centers in Europe prior to the Holocaust. North American cities rarely have chief rabbis. One exception however is Montreal, with two—one for the Ashkenazi community, the other for the Sephardi.

Jewish law provides no scriptural or Talmudic support for the post of a "chief rabbi." The office, however, is said by many to find its precedent in the religio-political authority figures of Jewish antiquity (e.g., kings, high priests, patriarchs, exilarchs and geonim). The position arose in Europe in the Middle Ages from governing authorities largely for secular administrative reasons such as collecting taxes and registering vital statistics, and for providing an intermediary between the government and the Jewish community, for example in the establishment of the Crown rabbi in several kingdoms of the Iberian Peninsula, the rab de la corte in the Kingdom of Castile or the arrabi mor in the Kingdom of Portugal, likely influenced by the expectations of their Catholic, Eastern Orthodox, and Anglican governments and neighbors. Similarly, in the 19th century there was a Crown rabbi of the Russian Empire.

== By country/region ==
=== Albania ===
- Joel Kaplan (2010–), Chabad shaliach, newly-created role

=== Argentina ===
==== Sephardi (Syrian) ====
- Salomon Benhamu
- Yosef Chehebar

=== Austria ===
- Isaac ben Moses of Vienna (Isaac Or Zarua) (ca. 1200–1270)
- Yom-Tov Lipmann Heller, "Tosfos Jomtov" (1578–1654)
- Shabtai Sheftel Horowitz (1561–1619)
- Gershon Ashkenazi (ca. 1612–1693)
- Samson Wertheimer (1658–1724)
- Mosche Chanoch Berliner (1727–1793)
- Isaak Noah Mannheimer (1824–1865)
- Lazar Horowitz (1828–1868), chief rabbi of Vienna
- Adolf Jellinek (1865–1893)
- Moritz Güdemann (1894–1918)
- Zwi Perez Chajes (1918–1927)
- David Feuchtwang (1933–1936)
- Israel Taglicht (1936), provisional chief rabbi
- Isidor Öhler (1946), preacher at the Stadttempel
- Akiba Eisenberg (1948–1983)
- Paul Chaim Eisenberg (1983–2016)
- Arie Folger (July 2016)

=== Belgium ===
The title of Chief Rabbi of Belgium, legally equivalent to a Roman Catholic archbishop in Belgium’s salary grid for religious officials, is filled in by the institutionally recognized and state-funded Israelite Central Consistory of Belgium (CCIB/CICB), which only represents 17 synagogues out of at least 43; there are also Chief Rabbis for the cities of Antwerp and Brussels.

- Eliakim Carmoly (1832–1834)
- Henri Loeb (1834–1859)
- Élie-Aristide Astruc (1866–1879)
- Jacques-Henri Dreyfuss (1880–1891)
- Armand Bloch (1891–1923)
- Ernest Ginsburger (1924–1929)
- Joseph Wiener (1931–1940)
- Salomon Ullman (1940–1957)
- Robert Dreyfus (Rabbi) (1963–1980)
- Albert Guigui (since 1980; also Chief Rabbi of Brussels since 1987)

=== Bulgaria ===
- Gabriel Mercado Almosnino (1880–1885)
- Preciado Bakish (1885–1889)
- Szymon Dankowicz (1889–1891)
- Moshe Tadjer (1891–1893)
- Moritz Grünwald (1893–1895)
- Preciado Bakish (1895–1898)
- Moshe Tadjer (1898–1900)
- Mordecai Ehrenpreis (1900–1914)
- M. Hezkeya Shabetay Davidov (1914–1918)
- David Pipano (1920–1925)
- No Chief Rabbi (1925–1945)
- Asher Hananel (1945–1949)
- Behor Kahlon (1990–2012)
- Aharon Zerbib (2012–2015)
- Yoel Yifrach (2015–Present)

=== Chile ===
- Angel Kreiman Brill, 1970s and 1980s

=== Colombia ===
==== Ashkenazi ====
- Eliezer Paltiel Roitblatt (1946-1957)
- Chaim Menachem Bentzion Blumenkrantz (Early 1950s)
- Alfredo Goldschmidt (1974–Present) (appointed 1991)

==== Sephardi ====
- Miguel Attias (1948–early 1950)
- David Sharbani (early 1950s–1978)
- Yehuda Benhamu (1978–1986)
- Yehuda Ari Azancot (1986–2000)
- Shlomo Meir Elharar (2000–2010)
- Avi Amsalem (2010–Dec. 2020)

=== Cuba ===
- Meyer Rosenbaum (Son of Isamar of Nadvorna, Elected 1948: left Cuba in 1956, a little more than two years before Fidel Castro came to power in the Revolution)
- Raphael Yair Elnadav (1956–1959)
- Shmuel Szteinhendler current Chief Rabbi of Cuba and regional director for Masorti Judaism in Latin America.

=== Croatia ===
- Miroslav Šalom Freiberger (1941–1943)
- Kotel Da-Don (1998–2006) from 2006 rabbi of the Bet Israel community Zagreb
- Luciano Moše Prelević (2006–)

=== Cyprus ===
- Arie Zeev Raskin (2005–present)

=== Czech Republic ===
- Karol Sidon

=== Denmark ===
- Abraham Salomon (1687–1700)
- Israel Ber (1700–1728)
- Marcus David (1729–1739)
- Hirsch Samuel Levy (1741–1775)
- Gedalia Levin (1778–1793)
- Abraham Gedalia (1793–1827)
- Abraham Wolff (1828–1891)
- David Simonsen (1892–1902, 1919–1920)
- Tobias Lewenstein (1903–1910)
- Max Schornstein (1910–1919)
- Max (Moses) Friediger (1920–1947)
- Marcus Melchior (1947–1969)
- Bent Melchior (1970–1996)
- Bent Lexner (1996–2014)
- Jair Melchior (2014–present)

=== Ecuador ===
- Menachem Mendel Fried (2022- )

=== Egypt ===
- Moses Israel (?-1802)
- Refael Aharon Ben Shimon (1891–1921)
- Masoud Haim Ben Shimon (1921–1925)
- Chaim Nahum (1925–1960)
- Haim Moussa Douek (1960–1972)

=== Estonia ===
- Michael Asher Alony (1995–1996)
- Efraim Shmuel Kot (2000–present)

=== The Far East ===
- Aharon Moshe Kiselev (1937–1949)

=== Finland ===
- Simon Federbusch (1931–1940)
- Eliezer Berlinger (1946–1951)
- Mika Weiss (1957–1961)
- Shmuel Beeri (1961–1963)
- Mordechai Lanxner (1973–1982)
- Ove Schwartz (1982–1987)
- Lazar Kleinman (–1992)
- Michael Asher Alony (1995–1996)
- Moshe Edelmann (1999–2012)
- Simon Livson (2012–)

==== Chabad-Lubavitch ====
- Benyamin Wolff (2003~)

=== France ===
- David Sintzheim (1808–1812)
- Abraham Vita de Cologna (1808–1826)
- Emmanuel Deutz (1810–1842)
- Marchand Ennery (1846–1852)
- Salomon Ulmann (1853–1865)
- Lazare Isidor (1866–1888)
- Zadoc Kahn (1889–1905)
- Alfred Lévy (1907–1919)
- Israël Lévi (1920–1939)
- Isaïe Schwartz (1939–1952)
- Jacob Kaplan (1955–1980)
- René-Samuel Sirat (1981–1987)
- Joseph Sitruk (1987–2008)
- Gilles Bernheim (2009–2013) (elected 22 June 2008, resigned 11 April 2013)
- Haim Korsia (2014–)

=== Galicia ===
- Aryeh Leib Bernstein (1778–1786)
- Edgar Gluck

Galicia is a historical region in Eastern Europe, that today forms part of Poland and Ukraine; the title of its Chief Rabbi was abolished on November 1, 1786 as part of the Josephinism Reforms.

Due to its being a center for Jewish scholarship, the Rabbi of Lemberg was traditionally seen as the Rabbi of Galicia in the era prior to World War II.

=== Greece ===
- Elias Barzilai
- Jacob Arar
- Gabriel Negrin

=== Guatemala ===
- Meyer Rosenbaum (Son of Isamar of Nadvorna, Later Chief Rabbi of Cuba)

=== Honduras ===
- Aaron Lankry

=== Hong Kong ===
- Ephraim Mirvis
- Mordecai Avston
- Netanel Meoded

=== Hungary ===
Note that this list is not in chronological order.

- Meir Eisenstadt known as the Panim Me'iros (1708–), rabbi of Eisenstadt and author of "Panim Me'irot"
- Alexander ben Menahem
- Phinehas Auerbach
- Jacob Eliezer Braunschweig
- Hirsch Semnitz
- Simon Jolles (1717–?)
- Samson Wertheimer (1693?–1724) (also Eisenstadt and Moravia)
- Iszachar Berus Eskelesz (Issachar Berush Eskeles) (1725–1753)
- Joseph Hirsch Weiss—grandfather of Stephen Samuel Wise
- Samuel Kohn
- Simon Hevesi (father of Ferenc Hevesi)
- Ferenc Hevesi
- Moses Kunitz, a pioneer of the Haskalah movement in Hungary (1828–1837)
- Jaakov Koppel Reich
- Chaim Yehuda Deutsch
- József Schweitzer
- Robert Deutsch

=== Iran ===
- Yedidia Shofet (1922–1980)
- Uriel Davidi (1980–1994)
- Yosef Hamadani Cohen (1994–2007)
- Mashallah Golestani-Nejad (2007–2011)
- Yehuda Gerami (2011–present)

=== Ireland ===
- Yitzhak HaLevi Herzog (1921–1937)
- Immanuel Jakobovits (1949–1958)
- Isaac Cohen (1959–1979)
- David Rosen (1979–1984)
- Ephraim Mirvis (1985–1992)
- Shimon Yehudah Harris (1993–1994)
- Gavin Broder (1996–2000)
- Yaakov Pearlman (2001–2008)
- Yoni Wieder (2023–present)

=== Israel ===
The position of chief rabbi (Hebrew: רַב רָאשִׁי) of the Land of Israel has existed for hundreds of years. During the Mandatory Period, the British recognized the chief rabbis of the Ashkenazi and Sephardi communities, just as they recognized the Mufti of Jerusalem. The offices continued after statehood was achieved. Haredi Jewish groups (such as Edah HaChareidis) do not recognize the authority of the Chief Rabbinate. They usually have their own rabbis who do not have any connection to the state rabbinate.

Under current Israeli law, the post of Chief Rabbi exists in only four cities (Jerusalem, Tel Aviv, Haifa, and Beersheba). In other cities there may be one main rabbi to whom the other rabbis of that city defer, but that post is not officially the "Chief Rabbi".

Many of Israel's chief rabbis were previously chief rabbis of Israeli cities.

==== Sephardi ====
- Moshe Galante (the Younger) (1665–1689)
- Moshe ibn Habib (1689–1696)
- Moshe Hayun
- Abraham ben David Yitzhaki (1715–1722)
- Binyamin Maali
- Elazar ben Yaacob Nahum (1730–1748)
- Nissim Mizrahi (1748–1754)
- Israel Yaacob Algazy (1754–1756)
- Raphael Samuel Meyuchas (1756–1791)
- Haim Raphael Abraham ben Asher (1771–1772)
- Yom Tov Algazy (1772–1802)
- Moshe Yosef Mordechai Meyuchas (1802–1805)
- Yaacob Moshe Ayash al-Maghrebi (1806–1817)
- Jacob Coral (1817–1818)
- Yosef ben Hayyim Hazan (1819–1822)
- Yom Tov Danon (1822–1824)
- Salomon Moshe Suzin (1824–1836)
- Yonah Moshe Navon (1836–1841)
- Yehuda ben Raphael Navon (1841–1842)
- Chaim Abraham Gagin (1842–1848)
- Isaac Kovo (1848–1854)
- Haim Nissim Abulafia (1854–1861)
- Haim David Hazan (1861–1869)
- Avraham Ashkenazi (1869–1880)
- Raphael Meir Panigel (1880–1892)
- Yaacob Shaul Elyashar (1893–1906)
- Yaacob Meir (1906)
- Eliyah Moshe Panigel (1907–1909)
- Nahman Batito (1909–1911)
- Moshe Yehuda Franco (1911–1915)
- Haim Moshe Elyashar (1914–1915)
- Nissim Yehuda Danon (1915–1921)
- Yaacob Meir (1921–1939)
- Benzion Uziel (1939–1954)
- Yitzhak Nissim (1955–1973)
- Ovadia Yosef (1973–1983)
- Mordechai Eliyahu (1983–1993)
- Eliyahu Bakshi-Doron (1993–2003)
- Shlomo Amar (2003–2013)
- Yitzhak Yosef (2013–2024)
- David Yosef (2024–present)

==== Ashkenazi ====
- Meir Auerbach—Rabbi of Jerusalem (1860–1871)
- Samuel Salant (1871–1909)
- Abraham Isaac Kook (1921–1935)
- Yitzhak HaLevi Herzog (1936–1959)
- Isser Yehuda Unterman (1964–1973)
- Shlomo Goren (1973–1983)
- Avraham Shapira (1983–1993)
- Yisrael Meir Lau (1993–2003)
- Yona Metzger (2003–2013)
- David Lau (2013–2024)
- Kalman Ber (2024–present)

==== Military Rabbinate ====
- Shlomo Goren (1948–1968)
- Mordechai Piron (1968–1977)
- Gad Navon (1977–2000)
- Israel Weiss (2000–2006)
- Avichai Rontzki (2006–2010)
- Rafi Peretz (2010–2016)
- Eyal Karim (2016–)

=== Japan ===
- Binyamin Edre'i (2015–present)

=== Latvia ===
- Mordechai Nurock

=== Lebanon ===
- Moïse Yedid-Levy (1799–1829)
- Ralph Alfandari
- Youssef Mann (1849)
- Aharoun Yedid-Levy
- Zaki Cohen (1875)
- Menaché Ezra Sutton
- Jacob Bukai
- Haïm Dana
- Moïse Yedid-Levy
- Nassim Afandi Danon (1908–1909)
- Jacob Tarrab (1910–1921)
- Salomon Tagger (1921–1923)
- Shabtai Bahbout (1924–1950)
- Benzion Lichtman (1932–1959)
- Shahud Chreim (1960–1978)

=== Lithuania ===
- Avraham Duber Kahana Shapiro

=== Luxembourg ===
- Samuel Hirsch (1843–1866)
- Robert Serebrenik (1929–1941)

=== Mexico ===
- Shlomo Tawil (1998–Present)

=== North Macedonia ===
- Avi Kozma

=== Morocco ===
- Mardo Chee Bengio Chief Rabbi of Tangier.
- Raphael Ankawa (1918–1935)
- Mikail Encaoua
- Chalom Messas (1961–1978)
- Aaron Monsonego (1994–2018)
- Yoshiyahu Pinto (2019–present)

=== Nepal ===
- Chezki Lifshitz (2000–present)

=== Norway ===
- Isaak Julius Samuel (1930–1942)
- Michael Melchior (1980–present)

=== Panama ===
- Zion Levy (1951–2008) Sephardic Chief Rabbi
- Aaron Laine (1986–) Ashkenazi Chief Rabbi
- David Perets (2016–) Sephardic Chief Rabbi

=== Peru ===
- Abraham Moshe Brener (1930–1967)
- Baruj Epstein (1966–1967)
- Yaakov Kraus (1987–1998)
- Efraim Zik (1999–2009)
- Itay Meushar (2009–2016)
- Salomon Cohen (2016–2019)

=== Poland ===
- Jacob Pollak (appointed 1503)
- Moses Fishel (1541–1542)
- Dow Ber Percowicz (1945–1956)
- Zew Wawa Morejno (1956–1957)
- Dow Ber Percowicz (1957–1961)
- Uszer Zibes (1961–1966)
- Zew Wawa Morejno (1966–1973)
- Pinchas Menachem Joskowicz (1988–1999)
- Michael Schudrich (2004–present)

==== Military rabbinate ====
- Chaim Elizjer Frankl (?–1933)
- Major Baruch Steinberg (1933–circa 12 April 1940) murdered by NKVD in the Katyn massacre

=== Romania ===
- Jacob Itzhak Niemirower (1921—1939)
- Alexandru Safran (1940–1948)
- Moses Rosen (1948–1994)
- Menachem Hacohen (1997–2012)
- Rafael Shaffer (2012–present)

=== Russia ===
- Adolf Shayevich (1983, officially since 1993–present)
- Chabad
  - Berel Lazar (2000–present)
- Military Rabbinate
  - Aharon Gurevich (2007–present)

=== Serbia ===
- Isaac Alcalay (till 29 December 1978, also Chief Rabbi of Yugoslavia from 1923 to 1941)
- Isak Asiel

=== Singapore ===
- Mordechai Abergel

=== Slovakia ===
- Moses Sofer (1806–1839)
- Samuel Benjamin Sofer (1839–1871)
- Bernát Szófér (Simcha Bunem Sofer) (1871–1907)
- Akiba Szófér (Akiva Sofer) (1907–1938)
- Eliáš Katz (1950–1968)
- Baruch Myers (1993–present)

=== South Africa ===
- Judah Leo Landau (1915–1942)
- Louis Rabinowitz (1945–1961)
- Bernard M. Casper (1963–1987)
- Cyril Harris (1988–2004)
- Warren Goldstein (2005–present)

=== Spain ===
The following are Chief Rabbis of the Jewish Community of Madrid (CJM):

- Baruj Garzon (1968–1978), the first Chief Rabbi in Spain since the expulsion in 1492
- Yehuda Benasouli (1978–1997)
- Moshe Bendahan (1997–present)

==== Chabad-Lubavitch ====
- Menachem Naftalin (2025–)

=== Sudan ===
- Solomon Malka (1906–1949)
- Haim Simoni (1950–1952)
- Massoud El-Baz (1956–1965 by which time the Jewish community in Sudan had declined so dramatically that they could not afford to pay a Rabbi)

=== Syria ===
- Yom Tov Yedid (1960–1982), moved to the United States in 1982 and died 27 July 2016 in the United States

=== Thailand ===
- Yosef Kantor (1992–present)

=== Transylvania (before 1918) ===
Note: The chief rabbi of Transylvania was generally the rabbi of the city of Alba Iulia.

- Joseph Reis Auerbach (d. 1750)
- Shalom Selig ben Saul Cohen (1754–1757)
- Johanan ben Isaac (1758–1760)
- Benjamin Ze'eb Wolf of Cracow (1764–1777)
- Moses ben Samuel Levi Margaliot (1778–1817)
- Menahem ben Joshua Mendel (1818–23)
- Ezechiel Paneth (1823–1843)
- Abraham Friedmann (d. 1879), last chief rabbi of Transylvania

=== Tunisia ===
- Chaim Madar (1984–2004)

=== Turkey ===
- Eli Capsali (1452–1454)
- Moses Capsali (1454–1497)
- Elijah Mizrachi (1497–1526)
- Mordechai Komitano (1526–1542)
- Tam ben Yahya (1542–1543)
- Eli Rozanes ha-Levi (1543)
- Eli ben Hayim (1543–1602)
- Yehiel Bashan (1602–1625)
- Joseph Mitrani (1625–1639)
- Yomtov Benyaes (1639–1642)
- Yomtov Hananiah Benyakar (1642–1677)
- Chaim Kamhi (1677–1715)
- Judah Benrey (1715–1717)
- Samuel Levi (1717–1720)
- Abraham Rozanes (1720–1745)
- Solomon Hayim Alfandari (1745–1762)
- Meir Ishaki (1762–1780)
- Eli Palombo (1780–1800)
- Chaim Jacob Benyakar (1800–1835)
- Abraham Levi Pasha (1835–1839)
- Samuel Hayim (1839–1841)
- Moiz Fresko (1841–1854)
- Yacob Avigdor (1854–1870)
- Yakir Geron (1870–1872)
- Moses Levi (1872–1909)
- Chaim Nahum Effendi (1909–1920)
- Shabbetai Levi (1920–1922)
- Isaac Ariel (1922–1926)
- Haim Bejerano (1926–1931)
- Haim Isaac Saki (1931–1940)
- Rafael David Saban (1940–1960)
- David Asseo (1961–2002)
- Ishak Haleva (2003–2025)

==== Chabad ====
- Mendy Chitrik (2003–present)

=== Uganda ===
- Gershom Sizomu (present) (see: Abayudaya)

=== Ukraine ===
- Yaakov Dov Bleich (1992–)
- Moshe Reuven Azman (2005–)
- Azriel Chaikin (2003–2008)
- Penitentiary rabbinate
  - Jonathan Markovitch (2009–)

=== United Arab Emirates ===
- Levi Duchman (2015-present) first resident rabbi to the UAE, appointed Chabad Shaliach to the UAE in 2020, making him the first Chabad Shaliach in a Gulf country. Directs the Jewish Community Center of the UAE. Rabbi Yehuda Sarna is the current Chief Rabbi of the Jewish Council of the Emirates.

=== United Kingdom and Commonwealth ===
==== Presbyter Judaeorum (England) ====
- Jacob of London, (appointed 1199)
- Josce of London (1217–1237)
- Aaron of York (1237)
- Elias le Evesque (appointed 1237)
- Hagin fil Mosse (appointed 1257)
- Hagin fil Deulacres (appointed 1281 by the favour of Eleanor of Provence).

==== Chief Rabbis (Orthodox) ====
The United Hebrew Congregations, a body of Orthodox synagogues, chooses a Chief Rabbi.

- Aaron Hart (1704–1756)
- Hart Lyon (1758–1764)
- David Tevele Schiff (1765–1791)
- Solomon Hirschell (1802–1842)
- Nathan Marcus Adler (1845–1891)
- Hermann Adler (1891–1911)
- Joseph Herman Hertz (1913–1946)
- Israel Brodie (1948–1965)
- Immanuel Jakobovits (1966–1991; knighted 1981, life peer 1988)
- Jonathan Sacks (1991–2013; knighted 2005, life peer 2009)
- Ephraim Mirvis (2013–present; knighted 2023)

==== Spanish and Portuguese community Hahamim/senior rabbis ====
The Sephardi Jews in the United Kingdom are mainly members of independent synagogues. There is no single rabbi recognised by them as a chief rabbi. The Spanish and Portuguese community, however, consists of several synagogues, charities, a beth din and a kashruth authority. These are under the leadership of an ecclesiastical head. Historically, the individual who fills this role is recognised as a senior rabbi of Anglo Jewry, being the leader of the oldest Jewish community in the country. The Senior Rabbi was traditionally given the title, Haham, meaning "wise one". Since 1918, however, only Solomon Gaon was given this title. The official title of the holder of this office is now The Senior Rabbi of the S&P Sephardi Community of the United Kingdom.

- Jacob ben Aaron Sasportas (1664–1665)
- Yehoshua Da Silva (1670–1679)
- Jacob Abendana (1681–1684)
- Solomon Ayllon (1689–1700)
- David Nieto (1701–1728)
- Isaac Nieto (1732–1740)
- Moshe Gomes de Mesquita (1744–1751)
- Moshe Cohen d'Azevedo (1761–1784)
- Raphael Meldola (1806–1828)
- Benjamin Artom (1866–1879)
- Moses Gaster (1887–1918)
- Shem Tob Gaguine (1920–1953) (officially the "Ecclesiastical Chief of the Spanish & Portuguese Jews' Congregation," not the Haham)
- Solomon Gaon (1949–1995)
- Abraham Levy (1995–2012) (officially the Communal Rabbi and Spiritual Head of the Spanish & Portuguese Jews' Congregation, not the haham)
- Joseph Dweck (2013–) (elected Senior Rabbi of The S&P Sephardi Community, not the haham)

=== United States ===
A chief rabbinate never truly developed within the United States for a number of different reasons. While Jews first settled in the United States in 1654 in New York City, rabbis did not appear in the United States until the mid-nineteenth century. This lack of rabbis, coupled with the lack of official colonial or state recognition of a particular sect of Judaism as official effectively led to a form of congregationalism amongst American Jews. This did not stop others from trying to create a unified American Judaism, and in fact, some chief rabbis developed in some American cities despite lacking universal recognition amongst the Jewish communities within the cities (for examples see below). However, Jonathan Sarna argues that those two precedents, as well as the desire of many Jewish immigrants to the US to break from an Orthodox past, effectively prevented any effective Chief Rabbi in America.

=== Uruguay ===
- Jaime Spector (1931–1937)
- Aaron Milevsky (1937–1943)
- Aaron Laschover (1943–1967)
- Nechemia Berman (1970–1993)
- Eliahu Birenbaum (1994–1999)
- Yosef Bittón (1999–2002)
- Mordejai Maarabi (2002–2009)
- Shai Froindlich (2009–2010)
- Isaac Fadda (2011–2012)
- Ben-Tzion Spitz (2013–2016)
- Max Yojanan Godet (2017–present)

=== Uzbekistan ===
- Baruch Abramchayev

=== Venezuela ===
- Sephardi
  - Isaac Cohen
- Ashkenazi
  - Pynchas Brener (1967–)

== By city ==
=== Austria ===
==== Vienna ====
- Yitshak Ehrenberg (1983–1989)
- Akiba Eisenberg
- Paul Chaim Eisenberg
- Arie Folger

=== Belgium ===
==== Antwerp ====
- Chaim Kreiswirth (1953–2001)

==== Brussels, Belgium ====
- Albert Guigui

=== Bulgaria ===
==== Sofia ====
- Daniel Zion (in World War II)
- Asher Hananel (in World War II)

=== Canada ===
==== Montreal, Quebec ====
===== Ashkenazi =====
- Zvi Hirsch Cohen (1922–1950)
- Sheea Herschorn (1951–1961)
- Pinchas Hirschprung (1969–1998)
- Avraham David Niznik (1998–2006)
- Binyomin Weiss (2007–Present)

===== Sephardi =====
- David Sabbah

==== Toronto, Ontario ====
The title of chief rabbi in Toronto has generally referred to leadership within the city's Orthodox community rather than to an office representing all Jewish congregations.

- Joseph Weinreb (c. 1900–1943), described by the Ontario Jewish Archives as Toronto's first chief rabbi and first Orthodox rabbi.
- Avraham Aharon Price (1900–1994), a leading Orthodox rabbinic authority in Toronto who headed the city's beth din and was also described as chief rabbi of Toronto.

===== Sephardic =====
- Amram Assayag, chief rabbi of the Sephardic Rabbinate of Ontario, an organization founded in 1994 to serve Sephardic synagogues and communities in Ontario.

=== China ===
==== Shanghai ====
- Meir Ashkenazi (1926–1949)

=== Croatia ===
==== Zagreb ====
- Hosea Jacobi (1880–1925)
- Miroslav Šalom Freiberger (1941–1943)

=== Denmark ===
==== Copenhagen ====
- David Simonsen (1879–1891)
- Elias Kalischer
- Hirsch Goitein (–1903)
- Max Schornstein (1906–1910)
- Bent Melchior (1963–1970)
- Jacob Garfinkel (1971–1973)

=== Egypt ===
==== Alexandria ====
- Raphael Della Pergola (1910–1918)

=== Finland ===
==== Helsinki ====
- Naftali Amsterdam (1867–1875)
- Avrohom Schain (1876–1881)
- Abraham Werner-Homa (1881–1891)
- Shmuel Noson Bukantz (1892–1924)
- Scholem Triestman (1928–1929)

=== France ===
==== Paris ====
- Michel Seligmann (1809–1829)
- Marchand Ennery (1829–1845)
- Lazare Isidor (1847–1865)
- Zadoc Kahn (1866–1889)
- Jacques-Henri Dreyfuss (1891–1933)
- Julien Weill (1933–1950)
- Jacob Kaplan (1950–1955)
- Meyer Jaïs (1956–1980)
- Alain Goldmann (1980–1994)
- David Messas (1994–2011)
- Michel Gugenheim (2012– )

=== Germany ===
==== Frankfurt ====
- Nathan Marcus Adler
- Menachem Klein

==== Hannover ====
- Samuel Freund (1924–1939)
- Chaim Pinchas Lubinsky (1946–1949)
- Shlomo Zev Zweigenhaft (1949–1952)

==== Munich ====
- Yitshak Ehrenberg (1989–1997)
- Pinchos Biberfeld, moved back to Germany from where he had emigrated to Israel over 50 years earlier. (1980–1999)
- Steven Langnas, first German (descendance) Chief Rabbi and Av Beth Din of Munich (1999–2011)

==== Würzburg ====
- Abraham Bing (1814–1839)

=== Hungary ===
==== Budapest ====
- Yonasan Steif (pre-World War II)

=== Italy ===
==== Milan ====
- Avraham David Shaumann
- Elia Kopciovsky (195?–1980)
- Giuseppe Laras (1980–2005)
- Alfonso Arbib (2005–present)

==== Rome ====
- Israel Zolli (1940–1945)
- Elio Toaff (1951–2002)
- Riccardo Di Segni (2002–present)

=== Land of Israel ===
==== Haifa ====
===== Ashkenazi =====
- She'ar Yashuv Cohen (1927–2016)

===== Sephardi =====
- Eliyahu Bakshi-Doron (1993–2003)

==== Hebron ====
- Chaim Hezekiah Medini (1891–1904)
- Dov Lior – present

==== Jerusalem ====
===== Sephardi =====
- Levi Ibn Habib
- David Ibn Abi Zimra
- Moshe Galante I
- Haim Vital
- Betzalel Ashkenasi
- Gedalia Cordovero
- Isaac Gaon
- Israel Benjamin
- Yaacov Tzemah
- Shemuel Garmison
- Moshe Galante II (1665–1689)
- Moshe Ibn Habib (1689–1696)
- Moshe Hayun
- Abraham ben David Yitzchaki (1715–1722)
- Binyamin Maali
- Elazar ben Yaacob Nahum (1730–1748)
- Nissim Mizrahi (1748–1754)
- Israel Yaacob Algazy (1754–1756)
- Raphael Samuel Meyuchas (1756–1791)
- Haim Raphael Abraham ben Asher (1771–1772)
- Yom Tov Algazy (1772–1802)
- Moshe Yosef Mordechai Meyuchas (1802–1805)
- Yaacob Moshe Ayash al-Maghrebi (1806–1817)
- Jacob Coral (1817–1819)
- Raphael Yosef Hazzan (1819–1822)
- Yom Tov Danon (1822–1824)
- Salomon Moshe Suzin (1824–1836)
- Yonah Moshe Navon (1836–1841)
- Yehudah Raphael Navon (1841–1842)
- Haim Abraham Gagin (1842–1848)
- Isaac Kovo (1848–1854)
- Haim Nissim Abulafia (1854–1861)
- Haim David Hazan (1861–1869)
- Abraham Ashkenasi (1869–1880)
- Raphael Meir Panigel (1880–1892)
- Yaacob Shaul Elyashar (1893–1906)
- Yaacob Meir (1906)
- Eliyah Moshe Panigel (1907–1909)
- Nahman Batito (1909–1911)
- Moshe Franco (1911–1915)
- Haim Moshe Elyashar (1914–1915)
- Nissim Yehudah Danon (1915–1921)
- Yaacob Meir (1921–1939)
- Chalom Messas (1978–2003)
- Shlomo Amar (2014–present)

===== Ashkenazi =====
- Meir Auerbach (?–1878)
- Shmuel Salant (1878–1909)
- Chaim Berlin (1909–1912?)
- Abraham Isaac Kook (1919–1935)
- Tzvi Pesach Frank (1936–?)
- Betzalel Zolty (1977–?)
- Yitzhak Kolitz (1983–2002)
- Aryeh Stern (2014–2026)

===== Edah HaChareidis =====
Note: The Edah HaChareidis is unaffiliated with the State of Israel. It is a separate, independent religious community with its own Chief Rabbis, who are viewed, in the Haredi world, as being the Chief Rabbis of Jerusalem.

- Yosef Chaim Sonnenfeld (1919–1932)
- Yosef Tzvi Dushinsky (1932–1948)
- Zelig Reuven Bengis (1948–1953)
- Joel Teitelbaum of Satmar (1953–1979)
- Yitzchok Yaakov Weiss (1979–1989)
- Moshe Aryeh Freund (1989–1996)
- Yisroel Moshe Dushinsky (1996–2002)
- Yitzchok Tuvia Weiss (2002–2022)

==== Modi'in Illit ====
- Meir Kessler

==== Tel Aviv-Yafo ====
===== Sephardi =====
- Ben-Zion Meir Hai Uziel (1911–1939)
- Ya'akov Moshe Toledano (1942–1960)
- Ovadia Yosef (1968–1973)
- Hayim David HaLevi (1973–1998?)

=== Netherlands ===
==== Amsterdam ====
===== Ashkenazi =====
- David Lida (1680–1686)
- Aryeh Leib ben Saul (1740–1755)
- Saul Lowenstam
- Issachar Baer Berenstein
- Joseph Hirsch Dünner
- Abraham Samson Onderwijzer
- Lodewijk Hartog Sarlouis
- Justus Tal
- Aron Schuster
- Meir Just (1970–1978)
- Aryeh Ralbag (2008–2016)
- Eliezer Wolff (Av Beth Din, 2016–current)

===== Sephardi =====
- Menasseh Ben Israel
- Benjamin Ricardo
- Pinchas Toledano (2012–present)

==== The Hague ====
- Shaul ha-Levi meHaag (1748–1785)
- Tobias Tal (1895–1898)
- Dov Yehuda Schochet (1946–1952)

==== Leeuwarden, Friesland ====
- Joachim Loewenstam (1821–1836)
- Baruch Bendit Dusnus (1840–1886)
- Lion Wagenaar (1886–1895)
- Tobias Lewenstein (1895–1899)
- Samuel Azarja Rudelsheim (1900–1918)
- Bernard Davids (1924–1927)
- Simon Dasberg (1929–1932)
- Abraham Salomon Levisson (1935–1945)

==== Inter-Provincial Chief rabbinate ====
- Dov Yehuda Schochet (1946–1952) [Chief Rabbi of The Hague]
- Elieser Berlinger (1960–1985)
- Binyomin Jacobs (2008–recent)

==== Leiden ====
- Simon de Vries

==== Rotterdam ====
- Josiah Pardo (1648–1669) See his Haskama – Approbation to Sefer Nachalat Shiva, edition Amsterdam 1667, where he is mentioned as Chief Rabbi of both the Sephardi and Ashkenazi congregations in Rotterdam
- Yosia Pardo (1648–1669). Left in 1669 to Amsterdam.
- Yuda Loeb ben Rabbi Shlomo (1674–c.1700). Born in Wilna.
- Judah Salomon (1682)
- Judah Loeb ben Abraham Ephraim Asher Anshel (1700–1708) Born in Hamburg, left for Amsterdam.
- Solomon Ezekiel (1725–1735)
- Judah Ezekiel (1738–1755)
- Abraham Ezekiel (1755–79)
- Aryeh Leib Breslau (1741–1809)
- Judah Akiba Eger son of Akiba Eger I (invited but refused position)
- Elijah Casriel (1815–1833)
- E.J. Löwenstamm (1834–1845)
- Joseph Isaacsohn (1850–1871; one of three sons-in-law of Jacob Ettlinger who were Chief Rabbis in the Netherlands)
- Bernhard Löbel Ritter (1885–1928)
- Simon Hirsch (1928–1930)
- Aaron Davids (1930–1944)
- Justus Tal (1945–1954)
- Salomon Rodrigues Pereira (1954–1959)
- Levie Vorst (1959–1971)
- Daniel Kahn (1972–1975)
- Albert Hutterer (1975–1977)
- Dov Salzmann (1986–1988)
- Lody van de Kamp
- Raphael Evers

=== Poland ===
==== Krakow ====
- Boaz Pash (2006–2012)
- Eliezer Gurary (2014–present)

==== Warsaw ====
- Dow Ber Meisels (1856–1870)
- Pinchas Menachem Joskowicz (1988–1999)
- Baruch Rabinowitz (1999–2000)
- Michael Schudrich (2000–present)

=== Russia ===
==== Birobidzhan ====
- Mordechai Scheiner (2002–2020)
- Efraim Kolpak (2020–present)

==== Moscow ====
- Yaakov Mazeh (prior to 1924–1933)
- Shmarya Yehuda Leib Medalia (1933–1938)
- Shmuel Leib Medalia (1943)
- Shmuel Leib Levin (1943–1944)
- Shlomo Shleifer (1944–1957)
- Yehuda Leib Levin (1957–1971)
- Adolf Shayevich (1983, officially since 1993–present)
- Pinchas Goldschmidt (1993–2022)

=== Slovakia ===
==== Nové Zámky ====
- Ernest Klein (1931–1944)

=== Ukraine ===
==== Kyiv ====
- Jonathan Markovitch (2000 – present)

=== United Kingdom ===
==== Gateshead ====
- Naftoli Shakovitzky
- Betzalel Rakow
- Shraga Feivel Zimmerman (2008–2020)

=== United States ===
==== Baltimore, Maryland ====
- Abraham N. Schwartz (d. 1937)
- Joseph H. Feldman (retired 1972, d. 1992)

==== Chicago, Illinoiss ====
- Yaakov Dovid Wilovsky known as the Ridbaz, served as chief rabbi of the Russian-American congregations in the city 1903–1905.

==== Hoboken, New Jersey ====
- Chaim Hirschensohn (1904–1935). His post included Hoboken, Jersey City, Union Hill and the Environs.

==== New York, New York ====
- Jacob Joseph (1840–1902) was the only true Ashkenazi chief rabbi of New York City; there was never a Sephardi chief rabbi, although Dr. David DeSola Pool acted as a leader among the Sepharadim and was also respected as such. Others it has been said claimed the title of Chief Rabbi; eventually, the title became worthless through dilution.
- Chaim Jacob Wiedrewitz was the Chassidic chief rabbi of New York and Pennsylvania; he was previously the Chassidic Rav of Moscow and was officially called as "The Moskover Rav", immigrated in 1893 and died in 1911, he's buried in the Chabad society of the Bayside Cemetery in Ozone Park NY.
- Jacob S. Kassin was the Chief Rabbi of the Syrian Jewish community of New York 1930–1995.
- Leibish Wolowsky was the chief rabbi of the Galician community of NYC 1888–1913, he was previously the rabbi of Sambor, Austria and immigrated to the US in 1888. He died in 1913 and is buried in the Achum Ahuvim of Reizow at the Mount Zion Cemetery in Maspeth NY.
- Avrohom Aharon Yudelevitz who was previously the rav of Manchester, England was accepted in 1919 as the chief rabbi of the Jewish Arbitration Court of NYC. He authored many books on Jewish law and responsa. He died in 1930 and is buried in family plot at the Bayside cemetery in Ozone Park NY.

==== St. Louis, Missouri ====
- Chaim Fischel Epstein
- Menachem Zvi Eichenstein (1943–1982)
- Sholom Rivkin (1983–2011)

=== Venezuela ===
==== Caracas ====
===== Ashkenazi =====
- Pynchas Brener (1967–present)

===== Sephardi =====
- Isaac Cohén (–present)

== "Grand Rabbi" ==
The term "Grand Rabbi" is sometimes used to style a Hasidic Rebbe, particularly on a letterhead, when written in English.

== See also ==
- Grand Mufti
- Kohanim
- Rishamma
- Samaritan High Priest
