= South Hampstead Synagogue =

Synagogue in London, England

Coordinates: 51°32′43″N 0°09′30″W

South Hampstead Synagogue is a synagogue of the United Synagogue in the Belsize Park area of north London. It is located on Eton Villas. The present building dates from 2019 and replaced an earlier building that was completed in 1962.

== History ==
The synagogue had its origins in the 1930s with the merger of the Regent's Park Talmud Torah and the Belsize Park Hebrew Congregation in 1938. The Regent's Park Talmud Torah had been founded in the 1920s. The community named itself the South Hampstead Synagogue in 1960. The synagogue was perceived as "middle of the road" by its congregants; liberal worshippers joined the Belsize Square Synagogue and the more Orthodox helped found the Golders Green Beth Hamedrash (popularly known as Munk's).

The community tried to acquire the vicarage of the nearby St Saviour's church situated at the corner of Eton Road and Eton Villas to build their new synagogue in 1939 but they were outbid by Eton College. The site was subsequently leased to the community who then held their services in the vicarage's garden in a wooden hut. The vicarage itself was used as office space and for the cheder. Hampstead and Belsize Park were major destinations for Jewish refugees from Nazi Germany in the 1930s. The chazan was arrested at the synagogue in September 1939; he was accused of forging passports during the period of Jewish emigration from Nazi-occupied Europe. The congregation were greatly affected by the Second World War with the conscription of men and the evacuation of children and the resulting disruption to family life. Some members of the community who had recently been refugees had also been detained as internees on the Isle of Man.

In the post war period the congregation greatly increased in number with the return of refugees and people moving to the surrounding area. The Rosh Hashanah and Yom Kippur services were held in Hampstead Town Hall. The twice weekly cheder and services for children were held in the former vicarage of St Saviour's.

=== 1962 building ===
The cheder relocated to Zion House at Eton Avenue in the 1950s having outgrown its wooden hut. Plans were drawn up for a new 420 seat synagogue in the 1950s at a cost of £50,000 (equivalent to £1,011,473 in 2025).

The synagogue was built between 1959 and 1962 to a design by Edward Lyons of the architectural practice Lyons Israel Ellis. Lyons Israel Ellis were practitioners of the New brutalist style. The designer of the building is misattributed in the Pevsner Architectural Guides. The 1962 design was analysed by Gerald Adler in the 2020 monograph Modern Architecture and the Sacred. He felt the synagogue embodied traditional Orthodox designs with its central bimah and was externally "undemonstrative", fitting easily alongside the neighbouring Victorian residential villas. Adler praised the "intimacy and warmth" of the interior. Adler detailed the "receding panes of buff brickwork offset by a great south-facing clerestory of vertical, white, concrete louvres and boldly expressed staircases framing the main volume". The new building was consecrated by the Chief Rabbi of the United Hebrew Congregations of the Commonwealth, Israel Brodie. It was renamed the South Hampstead Synagogue after its 1960s rebuilding.

In 2014 a bid to have the synagogue listed on the National Heritage List for England was rejected by Historic England. In their assessment Historic England wrote of the original synagogue that although it was "not without interest as a post-war synagogue by a noted architectural practice" the building "lack[ed] the quality of interest in its design, detailing and planning, to mark it out amongst its contemporaries as being of national special interest. Its interior planning is typical, and it lacks features such as the decorative stained glass found in others of this period".

In November 2012 Gilad Shalit attended a service at the synagogue on his first visit to Britain since his release from captivity under Hamas militants.

In 2017 the nearby church of St Saviour on Eton Road invited the members of the South Hampstead Synagogue to a Shabbat dinner marking Holocaust Memorial Day.

=== 2019 redevelopment ===
By the 2000s the synagogue had become too small for the community. In 2013 plans were announced for a replacement synagogue complex. A four-storey building with space for community celebrations, classrooms and an extended basement was planned. Rabbi Shlomo Levin said that "The plans address our urgent needs as a community – in particular those at the two ends of the age spectrum and do so in a way which I believe is sensitive to the concerns of the local community". The redevelopment plans were approved in December 2014. 669 local residents wrote in support of the proposal including Michael Levy, Baron Levy. The plans were opposed by some local residents including the actor Derek Jacobi and the lawyer Helena Kennedy, Baroness Kennedy of The Shaws. The residents complained that the proposals would have a negative effect on congestion, parking and pollution and were "out of keeping with the local area".

Work on the new building began in 2017 and the new synagogue was completed in 2019 to designs by Allies and Morrison. During construction the congregation was based at a building in nearby Maresfield Gardens. The Shabbat and Yom tov services were held at a nearby Marriott Hotel. The new synagogue opened on the first day of Pesach in 2019. Writing in The Jewish Chronicle, Simon Rocker described the new building as a "model of elegant simplicity in wood, glass and stone". The new building has the same footprint as the previous synagogue but with double the internal space. The new building cost £14 million with the money entirely raised within the community. A single member of the community was able to match half of the donations.

The Torah ark was designed for the new building by Ron Arad. The sanctuary of the new building has seating for 340 and space for an additional 100. Men and women are seated on the same level; in the old building the women had sat in an upstairs gallery. Above the sanctuary is a floor for children and young people that accommodates the cheder. Rabbi Levin described the new synagogue as "a super-duper Shabbat compliant building" with automatic lights and water pumps.

In December 2019 graffiti referencing antisemitic tropes was found on a wall by the synagogue and in other locations in Belsize Park and Hampstead. Two people were arrested over the incident in May 2020.

In December 2022 the chief Rabbi of Kyiv, Jonathan Markovitch, met Ukrainian refugees from the Russo-Ukrainian war at a Hanukkah event at the synagogue.

In 2021 Keir Starmer participated in Mitzvah Day at the synagogue, helping to sort food for a local food bank and picking up litter from surrounding streets. He and his wife Victoria, who is Jewish, visited the synagogue in 2024 to celebrate the 100th anniversary of the synagogue's community.

The South African-born Rabbi Shlomo Levin and his wife Rebbetzin Dr Lynndy Levin were the leaders of the synagogue for 40 years before they stepped down in 2025. In 2023 Rabbi Levin was awarded the Member of the British Empire (MBE) for his service to the Jewish community and interfaith work. The couple's tenure was highly successful with the synagogue having been on the brink of closure before their arrival. The South Hampstead Synagogue had 2,500 members at the time of their retirement. The Chief Rabbi Sir Ephraim Mirvis said that the Levins had "carried this congregation upon their shoulders" and been "the cornerstone" of the South Hampstead Jewish community for the past 40 years. The Levins were succeeded by their son and daughter-in-law, Rabbi Eli Levin and Rebbetzin Lauren Levin in 2025.
