= Tobias Tal =

Dutch rabbi

Tobias Tal (June 16, 1847 – October 24, 1898) was a Dutch rabbi who served as Chief Rabbi of the Hague.

== Life ==
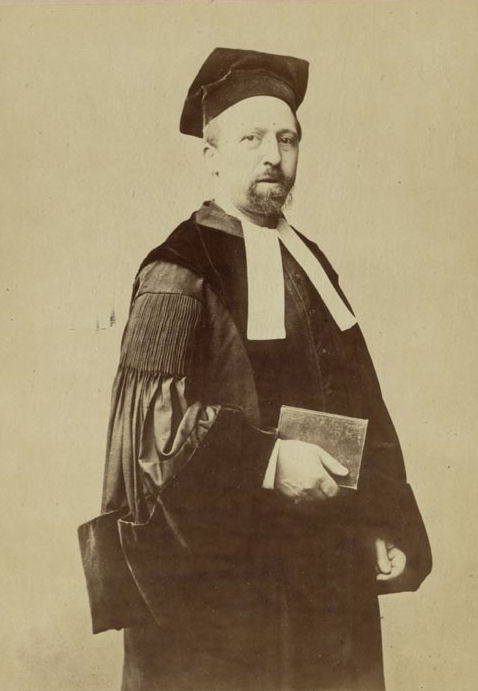
Tobias Tal (1847-1898), chief rabbi in the Netherlands

Tal was born on June 16, 1847, in Amsterdam, Netherlands, son of Z. T. Tal.

Tal studied at the rabbinical seminary of Chief Rabbi Joseph Hirsch Dünner from 1862 to 1874 and received a D.D. from the University of Utrecht in 1874. He was rabbi in Amsterdam for a short time. He then became Chief Rabbi of Gelderland, with his residence in Arnhem, from 1881 to 1895. In 1895, he became Chief Rabbi of the Hague to succeed Chief Rabbi Samuel Berisch Berenstein. As Chief Rabbi, he worked to further the Jewish community's religious life, although his more modern views led to clashes with several members of the synagogue board.

In 1880 and 1881, Tal was engaged in controversy with Professor van Oort of the University of Leyden regarding the ethical value of the Talmud. In 1887, he edited the Rotterdam periodical Choreben Jedidjah and published several articles under the pseudonym "Jotham." In 1898, he published Oranjebloesems, a history of the Jews of the Netherlands that used unpublished documents from the private archives of Queen Wilhelmina.

Tal's son Justus was also a rabbi who became chief rabbi of Utrecht in 1915.

Tal died in the Hague on October 24, 1898. People from all over the Netherlands attended the funeral at the principal synagogue in the Wagen Straat. The Portuguese congregation showed its sympathy when the cortege passed by opening its doors and lighting its chandeliers (which were draped in black). A number of people spoke at the cemetery, including Acting Chief Rabbi of the Hague I. L. Sohlberg, Jewish community president D. Polak Daniels, and Chief Rabbis Joseph Hirsch Dünner, Abraham van Loen, and Lion Wagenaar.
