= Niznik =

Niznik may refer to:

- Avrohom Dovid Niznik, Canadian rabbi
- Stephanie Niznik, an American actress
- Niznik Island, an island in Antarctica
