= Oath More Judaico =

Special oath imposed upon medieval Jews

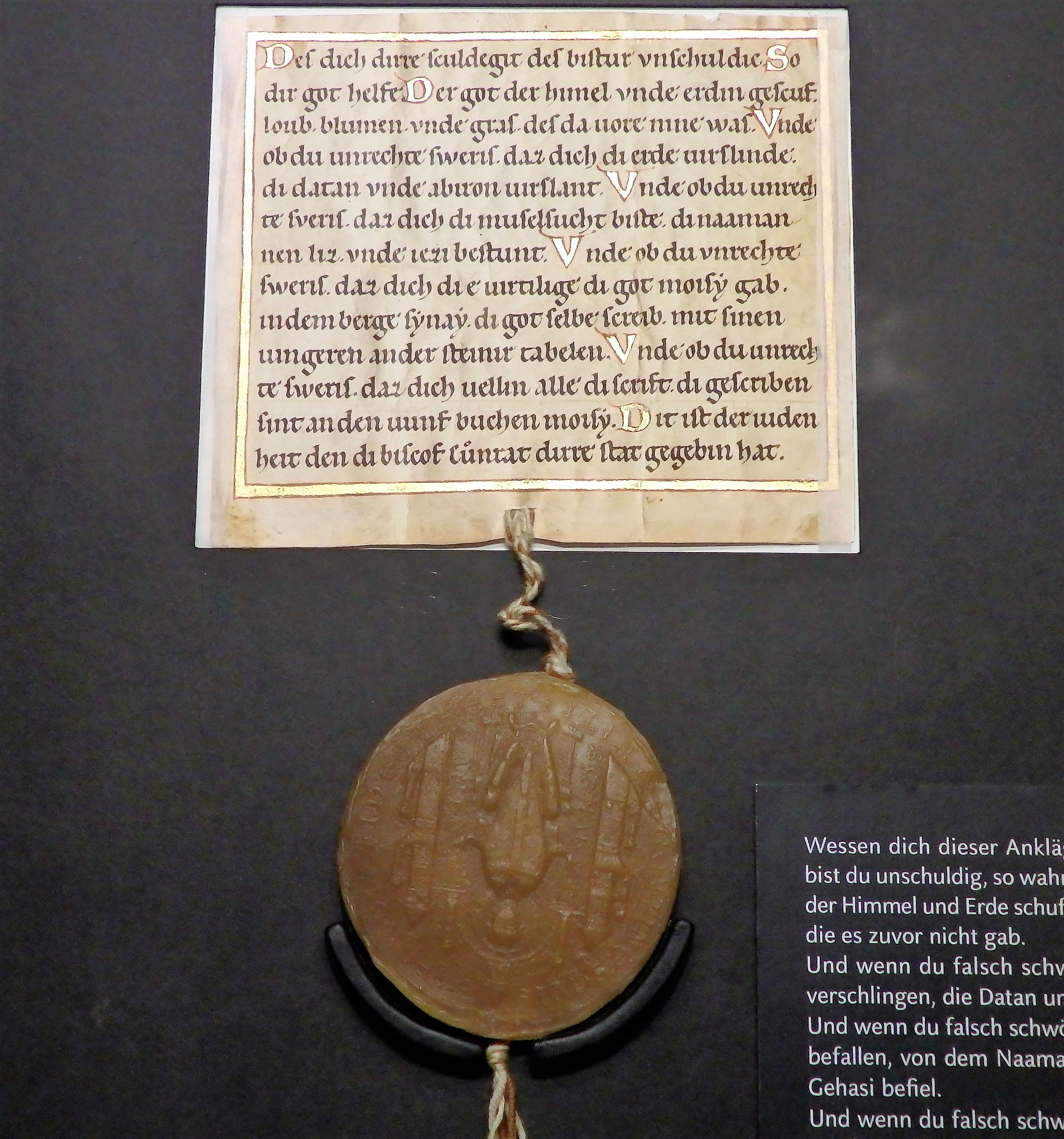
Facsimile of the Erfurt version of the Jewish oath, displayed in the Old Synagogue.

The Oath More Judaico or Jewish Oath was a special form of oath, rooted in antisemitism and accompanied by certain ceremonies and often intentionally humiliating, painful or dangerous, that Jews were required to take in European courts of law until the beginning of the 20th century. More Judaico is Latin for "according to Jewish custom."

The question of the trustworthiness of the Jewish oath was intimately connected with the meaning that Christian authorities assigned to the Kol Nidre prayer, recited by Jews on Yom Kippur, and the whole of the legislation regarding the oath was characteristic of the attitude of medieval states toward their Jewish subjects. The identification of Church and State seemed to render it necessary to have a different formula for those outside the state church. A similar version of the oath existed in Medieval Islamic countries such as Mamluk Egypt.

== Historical development ==
The disability imposed on a Jew engaged in legal contention with a Christian dates back to Byzantine emperor Justinian I, who declared that neither Jews nor heretics should be admitted as witnesses against Christians; secular courts, however, did not recognize this disability. Thus, in the safe conducts issued by the Carolingian kings in the 9th century, Jews and Christians were treated as equals, and consequently the testimony of the former, whether given under oath or not, was as admissible as the latter. This was distinctly stated in the charter granted by Holy Roman Emperor Henry IV to the Jews of Speyer in 1090. The law of Duke Frederick II of Austria (1244), which served as a model for much other legislation on the Jews, merely required a Jew to swear "super Rodal" (by the Torah). Similar laws existed in England, Portugal, and Hungary; Hungary waived the requirement to swear on the Torah in trivial cases.

There were, however, some older laws that prescribed certain practices intended to mock Jews in court. These examples illustrated the kinds of humiliating rituals that accompanied the taking of the oath:

- Byzantine Empire, 10th century: the Jew would wear a girdle of thorns around his loins, stand in water, and swear by "Barase Baraa" (Bereshit Bara), so that if he spoke untruth, he would be swallowed by the earth just like Dathan and Abiram in Numbers 16:1–27.
- Arles (c. 1150): a wreath of thorns would be hung on the swearer's neck, others would grovel at his knees, and a thorn branch five ells in length would be pulled "between his loins" while he swore and called down upon himself all the curses of the Torah.
- Swabia (13th century): the Jew would stand on the hide of a sow or a bloody lamb.
- Mamluk Sultanate, 13th/14th century: the Jew would swear that was purposefully worded to be degrading and ludicrous and contained a detailed, self-imposed curse in which he renounced all that he held sacred should his witness prove false.
- Silesia (1422): the Jew would stand on a three-legged stool and have to pay a fine each time he fell, finally losing his case if he fell four times.
- Dortmund: the Jew would be fined each time he halted in repeating the oath.
- Verbo, Hungary (1517): the Jew would stand barefooted and swear with his face turned to the east, holding the Pentateuch in his hand.
- Breslau (c. 1455): the Jew would stand bareheaded and pronounce the name of Yahweh.

== An example: Frankfurt oath ==
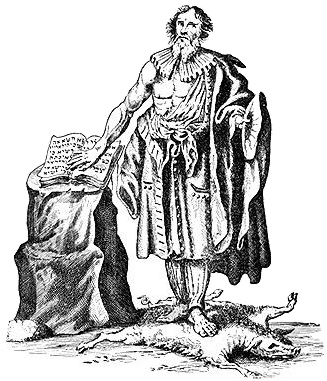
A 17th century drawing of a German Jew taking a Jewish oath.

The following formula, originally in Middle High German, was used in Frankfurt on the Main about 1392:

The Jew shall stand on a sow's skin and the five books of Master Moses shall lie before him, and his right hand up to the wrist shall lie on the book and he shall repeat after him who administers the oath of the Jews:

Regarding such property of which the man accuses you, you know nothing of it, nor do you have it. You never had it in your possession, you do not have it in any of your chests, you have not buried it in the earth, nor locked it with locks, so help you God who created heaven and earth, valley and hill, woods, trees, and grass, and so help you the law which God himself created and wrote with His own hand and gave Moses on Sinai's mount. And so help you the five books of Moses that you may nevermore enjoy a bite without soiling yourself all over as did the King of Babylon.

And may that sulphur and pitch flow down upon your neck that flowed over Sodom and Gomorrah, and the same pitch that flowed over Babylon flow over you, but two hundred times more, and may the earth envelop and swallow you up as it did Dathan and Abiram. And may your dust never join other dust, and your earth never join other earth in the bosom of Master Abraham if what you say is not true and right. [This refers either to a decent burial or to resurrection.] And so help you Adonai, you have sworn the truth.

If not, may you become as leprous as Naaman and Gehazi, and may the calamity strike you that the Israelite people escaped as they journeyed forth from Egypt's land. And may a bleeding and a flowing come forth from you and never cease, as your people wished upon themselves when they condemned God, Jesus Christ, among themselves, and tortured Him and said: Matthew 27:25 "His blood be upon us and our children." It is true, so help you God who appeared to Moses in a burning bush which yet remained unconsumed. It is true by the oath that you have sworn, by the soul which you bring on the Day of Judgment before the Court, [before the God of] Abraham, Isaac, and Jacob. It is true, so help you God and the oath you have sworn. [Amen].

== The oath as a Jewish disability ==
A decidedly aggressive change took place when, in 1555, the German imperial court procedure (Reichskammergerichtsordnung) prescribed a form of oath that, with some alterations, formed a model to subsequent legislation. The terms in which the swearer called down upon himself invoked all the curses of Leviticus and Deuteronomy, the ten plagues of Egypt, the leprosy of Naaman and Gehazi (see 2 Kings 5), the fate of Dathan and Abiram, etc.

According to a recount in his "Gesammelte Schriften", the German-Jewish philosopher Moses Mendelssohn of the Enlightenment persuaded the Prussian government to moderate the terms of the oath during the 18th century. The small German states gradually surrendered the most objectionable features of the oath: Hesse-Kassel (or Hesse-Cassel), in 1828; Oldenburg, 1829; Württemberg, 1832; Saxony, 1839 (on which occasion Zecharias Frankel published his famous "Die Eidesleistung"); Schaumburg-Lippe and Anhalt-Bernburg, 1842; and Hesse-Homburg, 1865.

Prussia retained the oppressive formula until 15 March 1869; the Netherlands modified the oath in 1818, and Russia in 1838 and 1860. The Jewish advocate Isaac Adolphe Crémieux won great fame by effecting the abolition of the oath through a case brought before the court of Nîmes in 1827. Lazard Isidor, as rabbi of Pfalzburg, refused in 1839 to open the synagogue for such an oath; prosecuted for contempt of court, he was defended by Crémieux and acquitted. The French Supreme Court finally declared the oath unconstitutional on March 3, 1846. However, as late as 1902, a court in Romania upheld that country's version of the oath.
