= Preciado =

Preciado is a Spanish surname. Notable people with the surname include:

- Ángelo Preciado (born 1998), Ecuadorian footballer
- Ayrton Preciado (born 1994), Ecuadorian footballer
- Carlos Preciado (born 1985), Colombian professional soccer player
- Édison Preciado (born 1986), Ecuadorian footballer
- Enrique Villa Preciado (born 1951), Mexican politician
- Francesco Preciado de la Vega (1713–1789), Spanish-Italian painter in neoclassical style
- Francisco Preciado (1713–1789), Spanish painter, active mainly in Italy
- Francisco Preciado (dancer) in Ballet San Jose, ballet company in California
- Harold Preciado (born 1994), Colombian professional footballer
- Jaime Preciado of Pierce the Veil, American rock band from San Diego, California
- Jonathan Romero Preciado (born 1986), Colombian boxer and Olympic bantamweight competitor
- Jorge Luis Preciado (born 1972), Mexican politician affiliated with the PAN
- Julio Preciado, banda singer based in Mazatlán, Sinaloa, Mexico
- Léider Preciado (born 1977), Colombian football striker
- Lenin Preciado (born 1993), Ecuadorian judoka
- Leobardo Curiel Preciado (born 1947), Mexican politician
- Manuel Preciado Rebolledo (1957–2012), Spanish footballer
- María Rodríguez Preciado (born 1978), Mexican politician
- Nativel Preciado (born 1948), Spanish journalist and writer
- Paul B. Preciado, (born 1970), Spanish writer, philosopher and curator

== See also ==
- Preciado Bakish
- Despreciado
- Preci
- Recado
