= Avrohom Dovid Niznik =

Canadian rabbi and rosh yeshiva

Personal life
- Born: February 8, 1921 Wysokie Mazowieckie, Poland
- Died: November 30, 2006
- Buried: Zeirai Dath Vedaath section, Baron de Hirsch Cemetery, Montreal
- Education: Baranowicz Yeshiva

Religious life
- Religion: Judaism

Jewish leader
- Predecessor: Pinchas Hirschprung
- Successor: Binyomin Weiss
- Position: Chief Rabbi of Montreal
- Organisation: Vaad Ha'Ir of Montreal
- Began: 1998
- Ended: 2006
- Yahrtzeit: 10 Kislev 5767

Avrohom Dovid Niznik (Hebrew: אברהם דוד ניזניק; February 8, 1921 – November 30, 2006) was a Canadian rabbi and rosh yeshiva, who served as Chief Rabbi of Montreal from 1998 until his death. Born in Poland, he arrived in Montreal in 1953 after serving as rosh yeshiva in Versailles and Antwerp.
