= Issachar Baer Berenstein =

Dutch rabbi

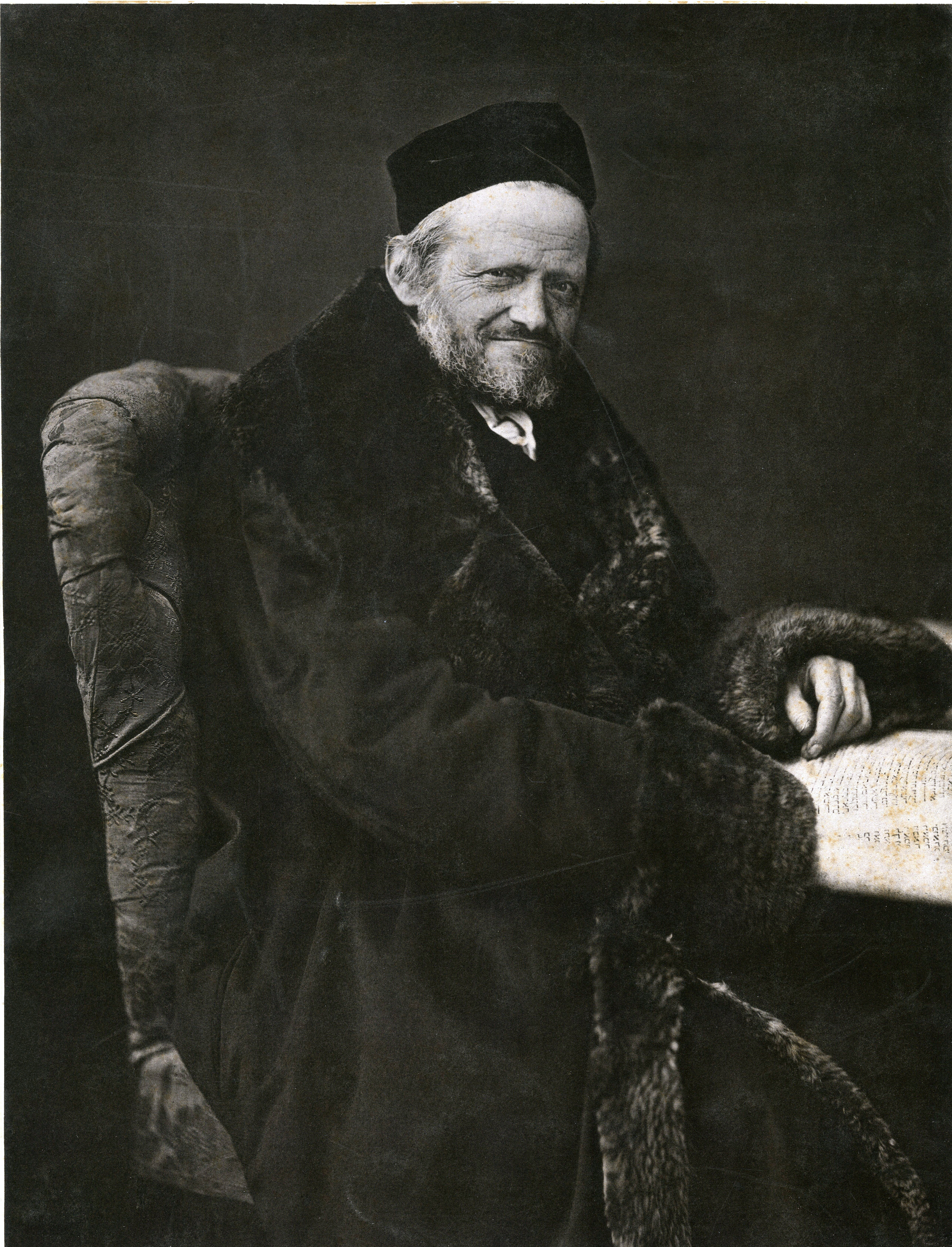
Issachar Baer Berenstein

Issachar Baer ben Samuel Berenstein (1808, Groningen – 16 December 1893, The Hague) was a Dutch rabbi. He was the son of Rabbi Samuel Berenstein, Chief Rabbi of Amsterdam, and was a dayyan of that town at the time of his father's death in 1838, continuing in that position for the following ten years. In 1848 he became Chief Rabbi of The Hague, succeeding Rabbi Joseph Asher Lehmans, who had died six years before. He held the latter position for forty-five years, during which time he contributed much to the building up of communal institutions, such as an orphan asylum and a Jewish hospital; he was also the organizer of a Jewish historical and literary society.

Berenstein's services were recognized by the government, and he was decorated with the insignia of the Order of the Golden Lion.
