= David Simonsen =

Chief Rabbi of Denmark (1892–1902; 1919–1920)

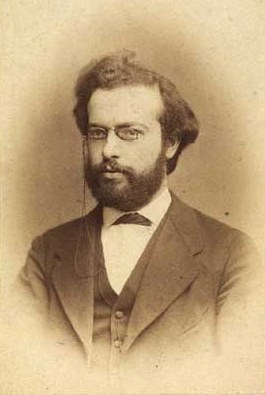
- Title: Chief Rabbi of Denmark

Personal life
- Born: 17 March 1853 Copenhagen, Denmark
- Died: 15 June 1932 (aged 79) Copenhagen, Denmark
- Spouse: Cora Salomon

Religious life
- Religion: Judaism

Jewish leader
- Predecessor: Abraham Wolff (1891); Mordecai Schornstein (1919)
- Successor: Tobias Lewenstein (1902); Max (Moses) Friediger (1920)
- Synagogue: Great Synagogue of Copenhagen
- Began: 1892 (first term); 1919 (second term)
- Ended: 1902 (first term); 1920 (second term)

David Jacob Simonsen (Hebrew: דוד יעקב סימונסן; 17 March 1853 – 15 June 1932) was born in Copenhagen, Denmark. He studied Oriental languages at the University of Copenhagen, and received his rabbinical training at the Jewish Theological Seminary in Breslau, one of the centres for "Wissenschaft des Judentums", a movement advocating the scientific study of Jewish history, literature, and culture in addition to the classical sources of Judaism.

After his graduation, Simonsen returned to Denmark, where he married Cora Caroline Salomon (1856–1938). He took a position with the Community of Mosaic and the Great Synagogue of Copenhagen, and after the passing of long-time Chief Rabbi Abraham Wolff in 1891, Simonsen was named chief rabbi of Denmark. He served from 1821 to 1902 and again briefly from 1919 to 1920. In 1903, Simonsen was awarded the title of professor by the University of Copenhagen.

Simonsen's archives reflect the history of several scientific disciplines over a full half century. The list of correspondents contains the names of leading scientists within Oriental and Jewish Studies but also from other areas, such as the classicist Ada Adler. During World War I, Simonsen acted as "communication central", maintaining all the important contacts in Denmark and abroad, between organisations and individuals. He was also able to relay messages between relatives on different sides of the front, and after the war, he continued to be active in different relief organisations, both in Denmark and abroad. The approximately 25,000 volumes in Hebrew, Yiddish, and several Western European languages, along with 190 volumes of manuscripts in some 15 languages from 20 countries were acquired by The Royal Library in 1932. Simonsen's collection forms the core of the library's Judaica Collection.
