= Binyomin Weiss =

Personal life
- Born: c. 1948 germany

Religious life
- Religion: Judaism

Jewish leader
- Predecessor: Avrohom David Niznik
- Position: Chief Ashkenazi Rabbi of Montreal
- Organisation: Vaad Ha'Ir of Montreal
- Began: 2007

Yonasan Binyomin (Benjamin) Weiss (Hebrew: יהונתן בנימין ווייס; born c. 1948) is an American-Canadian rabbi and dayan, who has served as Chief Ashkenazi Rabbi of Montreal since 2007. He arrived in Montreal in 2005 to serve as deputy head of the Montreal beit din, before which he served as rabbi of the Sanz community in Bnei Brak for 35 years.

== Publications ==
- Matanat Binyamin. 5781.
