= Shalom Messas =

Moroccan rabbi

Rabbi Shalom Messas
- שלום משאש
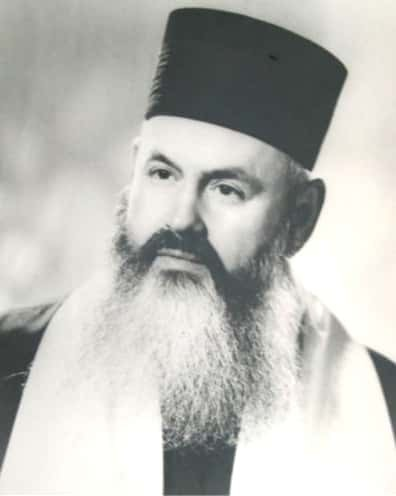
- Born: February 13, 1909; Meknes, Morocco
- Died: April 12, 2003 (aged 94); Jerusalem, Israel
- Resting place: Har HaMenuchot, Jerusalem, Israel; 31.796856°N 35.180755°E
- Known for: Religious teacher
- Title: Chief Rabbi of Jerusalem
- Relatives: Ruth Elkrief (great-niece)

Shalom Messas (Hebrew: שלום משאש) was a Moroccan rabbi and scholar who served as Chief Rabbi of Morocco, and later as Chief Rabbi of Jerusalem.

== Biography ==
Messas was born in Meknes, Morocco in 1909. He was the son of Rabbi Maimoun Messas and his wife, Rachel. In his youth, he studied with his father and with Rabbi Yitzhak Sabag, Dayan and Rosh Yeshiva in Meknes.

Messas also attended an Alliance Israélite Universelle school. He was a promising Torah prodigy at a very young age, and was a leading student of Morocco's Chief Rabbi Yehoshua Berdugo. The Messas family is an old one, with roots deep within Spain and Portugal. In 1960, he was appointed Chief Rabbi of Casablanca; he later served as Chief Rabbi of all Morocco. In 1978, then Israeli Chief Rabbi Ovadia Yosef asked Rabbi Messas to come to the holy city and become its Chief Sephardic Rabbinical authority. When he departed for Israel, Messas was escorted to the airport by Morocco's King Hassan II himself, who requested that the Rabbi bless him one last time before his departure, and with that was his last official act in Moroccan.

Ovadia Yosef consulted with Messas in matters of Jewish law and scholarship, often citing him as his support in issuing bold halachic decisions.

Messas worked on important matters of Halacha right up to his last days. He was said to be very exact in preserving Sephardic customs, and would work full days and nights to try to find a Halachic way to solve the issue at hand. As an author of many books, he wrote his first significant scholarly work, Mizrach Shemesh in 1930, and his last work, V'Cham HaShemesh was written in 2002.

Messas died on Shabbat Hagadol (April 12), 2003, at the age of 94. He was buried in Har HaMenuchot in Jerusalem. His many works include: Mizrah Shemesh, Tevouot Shemesh, Shemesh Umagen, Beit Shemesh and Veham Hashemesh.

He also edited and published the following books:

- Divre Moshe by Chief Rabbi Moses ben Abraham Berdugo, called "Mashbir"
- Divre Mordechai by Rabbi Mordechai Berdugo, Hamarbitz
- Torot Emet, Me Menuhot, Rav Peninim and Messamehe Lev by his great-great-great-grandfather Rabbi Raphael Berdugo
- Lev Mevin and Penei Mevin by Rabbi Mimoun Berdugo
- Edout Beyaakov by his great-grandfather Rabbi Yaacov Berdugo.
- Divre Chalom by his grandfather also named Rabbi Chalom Messas.
- Guevoul Binyamine
- Divre Yossef

== See also ==
- David Messas (his son).
