= Yaakov Pearlman =

Rabbi Yaakov Pearlman

Personal life
- Born: Manchester
- Spouse: Sheila Pearlman

Religious life
- Religion: Judaism
- Denomination: Orthodox

Jewish leader
- Predecessor: Gavin Broder
- Successor: Yoni Wieder
- Position: Chief Rabbi of Ireland
- Began: September 2001
- Ended: June 2008
- Semikhah: Manchester Yeshiva

Yaakov Pearlman is an English-born rabbi who served as Chief Rabbi of Ireland from September 2001 to June 2008.

== Early life and education ==
Rabbi Pearlamn was born and educated in Manchester, England. His mother and grandparents were Irish.

He attended yeshiva at the Manchester Yeshiva. At 20 years old, he was the youngest member of his class to be ordained a rabbi. Following his ordination, Pearlman moved to Lakewood, New Jersey where he pursued religious studies as a Fellow at Beth Medrash Govoha. In addition to his religious studies, he earned a Master's degree in Jewish History from Hofstra University and a Doctorate in Education from the University of California, San Diego.

== Career ==
Following the completion of his secular studies, Pearlman served as a congregational rabbi in Providence, Rhode Island. In addition to serving as a congregational rabbi, he taught students at the Hillel Community Day School of Brighton, N.Y. and Talmudical Institute of Upstate New York. In 1984, Pearlman was appointed spiritual leader of the Beth Joseph Center of Rochester, NY. He served in the role of congregational rabbi until the closure of the synagogue, and subsequently found a role as the spiritual leader of Congregation Light of Israel (Ohr Yisrael).

=== Chief Rabbi of Ireland ===
In 2001, Rabbi Pearlman was appointed to the position of Chief Rabbi of Ireland. He was inducted into the role on 30 January 2002 in a ceremony attended by Irish President Mary McAleese, leaders of multiple faiths, and then-Chief Rabbi of the United Hebrew Congregations of the Commonwealth Jonathan Sacks who delivered remarks.

As Chief Rabbi, Pearlman served the communal needs of the Irish community through hosting educational programs, overseeing conversions—a process which had been placed on pause in the absence of a Chief Rabbi—and increasing the supply of kosher food. As part of his efforts to increase the supply of kosher products, Pearlman oversaw the introduction of domestically produced kosher meat.

As Chief Rabbi, Pealman acted as a spokesperson of the Jewish community in Ireland. This included taking part in memorial services for fallen Irish veterans, the first official Irish State ceremony commemorating victims of the Holocaust, and greeting athletes participating in the 2003 Special Olympics Games. In 2004, ahead of the release of Mel Gibson's The Passion of the Christ, Pearlman condemned the film arguing that it was antisemitic in its portrayal of Jews "as bloodthirsty, evil, barbaric and as having betrayed and informed on Jesus." Pearlman went so far as to call for Pope John Paul II to condemn the film to avoid "open[ing] up old wounds and influence or ignite the antisemitism which is growing across Europe today."

In 2008, Pearlman resigned from the role of Chief Rabbi to retire to the United States. Upon his departure, the Jewish community Ireland was left without a Chief Rabbi until the installation of Yoni Wieder in 2024.

== Personal life ==
Pearlman is married to American mathematics and education professor Sheila Pearlman.

Since retiring to the United States, Rabbi Pearlman has taught students at Bais Hamedrash and Mesivta of Baltimore.

== See also ==
- History of the Jews in Ireland

Jewish titles
Preceded by Gavin Broder	Chief Rabbi of Ireland; 2001–2008	Succeeded by Yoni Wieder
