= Binyomin Jacobs =

Dutch rabbi (born 1949)

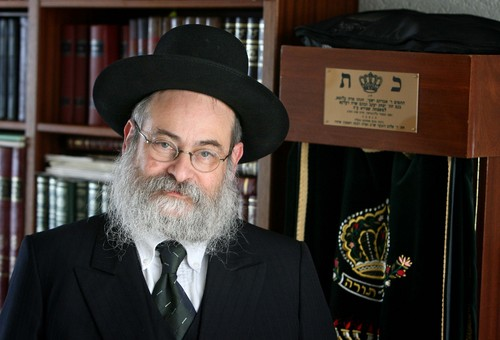
- Born: 1949 (age 76–77); Amsterdam
- Occupation: Chief Rabbi

Binyomin Jacobs (born 1949 in Amsterdam), is a Dutch rabbi who lives in Amersfoort, Netherlands. At the end of 2008 he was appointed Chief Rabbi of the IPOR resort of the Netherlands, this resort includes all the municipalities of the Netherlands, except the cities of Amsterdam, Rotterdam and The Hague.

== Biography ==
Rabbi Binyomin Jacobs is a descendant of an old Dutch Jewish family. His parents were of Ashkenazi Jewish descent, his two parents were survivors of the Shoah and World War II. After completing his secondary education, Jacobs studied at the yeshiva (Talmudic academy) of Brunoy in France.

Jacobs obtained his semicha (rabbinical ordination) from Rabbi Isser Yehuda Unterman, the Chief Rabbi of Eretz Israel, the highest rabbinical authority in Jewish law (Halacha), and Rabbi Zalman Nechemia Goldberg, a prominent rabbi in Israel. Jacobs is the Chief Rabbi of the Netherlands, the president of the rabbinical school of the Netherlands, and the rabbi of the Sinai Center located in Amstelveen, the only Jewish psychiatric center in Europe, with more than 3,000 patients.

When on March 17, 2019, the victims of the terrorist and Islamophobic attacks against two mosques located in Christchurch, New Zealand, were commemorated at the Dam Square in Amsterdam, Jacobs was one of the speakers, when he spoke, a small group of pro-Palestinian protesters turned their backs on him.

The Chief Rabbi is a member of the Chabad-Lubavitch chassidim. They are known for their openness to the non-religious Jewish community.

Jacobs is vice president of the local cheder, a traditional Jewish school located in Amsterdam. An abuse case took place at this school in 2012, which in 2018 resulted in the conviction of a teacher involved in the events. When the case broke out, the municipalities of Rotterdam and The Hague supported Jacobs, as well as the supreme rabbinate. Since then, relations with the rabbinate have improved due to several changes in municipal management.

After May 4, 2019, the chief rabbi advocated the appointment of a national coordinator against antisemitism. Jacobs has been able to build an extensive network of friendship and cooperation with several churches, especially with the Christian community: Orthodox, Protestant and Roman Catholic alike. Jacobs has participated in the organization of many exhibitions about Judaism On April 27, 2012, the Chief Rabbi Jacobs was appointed officer of the Order of Orange-Nassau.
