= Jonas Ennery =

French politician (1801–1863)

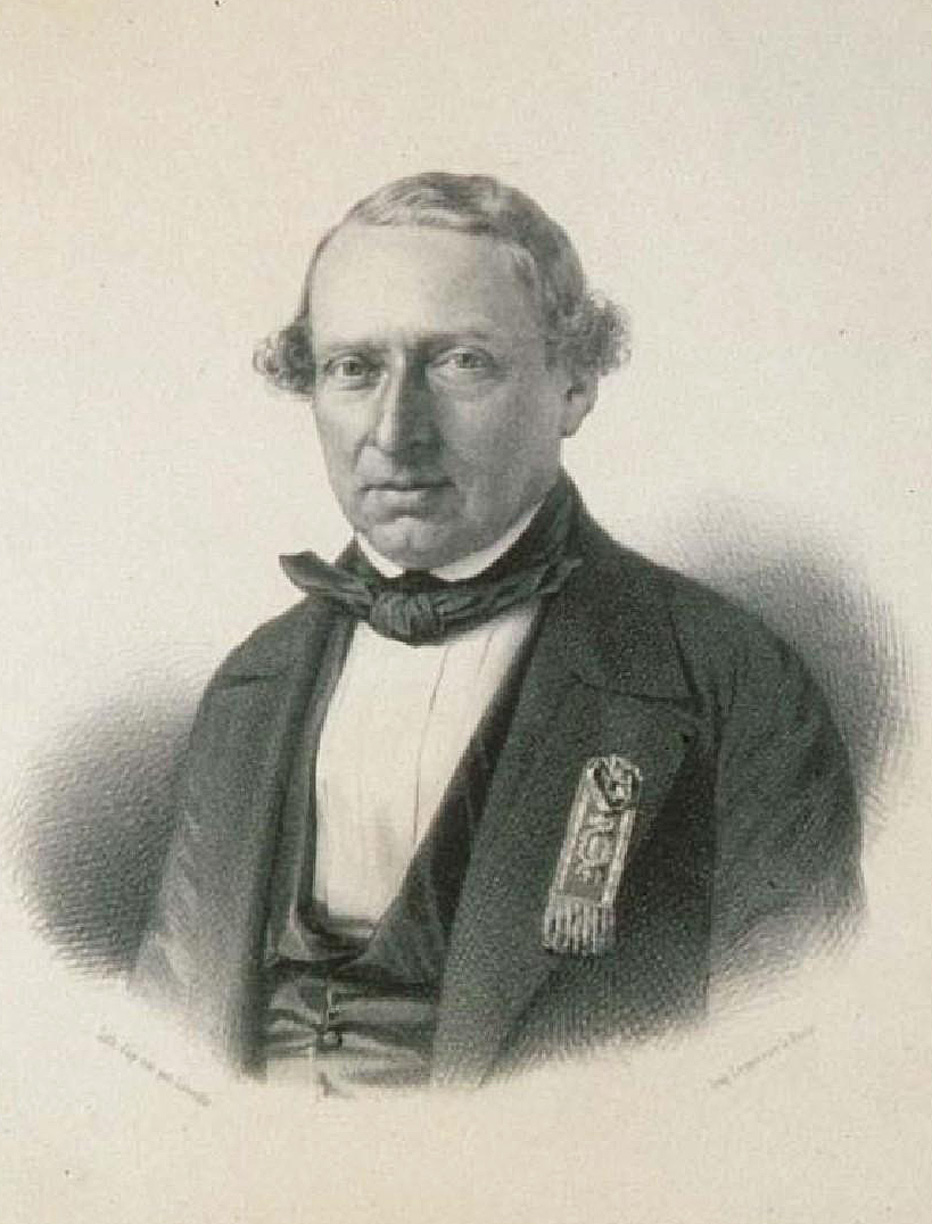
- Born: 2 January 1801; Nancy
- Died: 19 May 1863 (aged 18); Brussels
- Occupation(s): Lexicographer; Politician

Jonas Ennery (French pronunciation: [ʒɔnas ɛnʁi]; Jan. 2, 1801, Nancy - May 19, 1863, Brussels) was a French deputy. He was for twenty-six years attached to the Jewish school of Strasbourg, of which he became the head. In collaboration with Hirth, he compiled a Dictionnaire Général de Géographie Universelle (4 vols., Strasburg, 1839–41), for which Cuvier wrote a preface. Soon afterward he published Le Sentier d'Israël, ou Bible des Jeunes Israélites (Paris, Metz, and Strasburg, 1843). At the request of the Société des Bons Livres he took part in the editorship of Prières d'un Cœur Israélite, which appeared in 1848.

In 1849, despite anti-Jewish rioting in Alsace, Ennery was elected representative for the department of the Lower Rhine, and sat among the members of the "Mountain." He devoted his attention principally to scholastic questions. After the coup d'état he resisted the new order of things, and was exiled for life in 1852. He retired to Brussels, where he lived as a teacher until his death.

Ennery's brother, Marchand Ennery, was the chief rabbi of Paris.
