= David Messas =

Rabbi David Messas
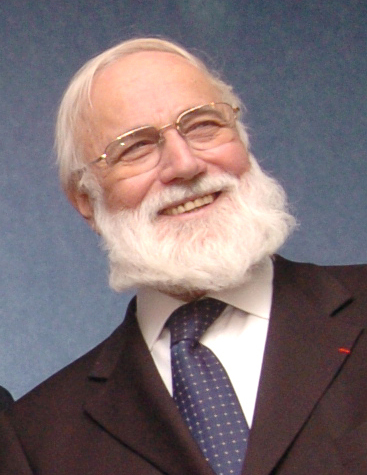
- David Messas in 2003

Chief Rabbi of Paris
- In office 1995–2011

Chief Rabbi of Geneva

Personal details
- Born: July 15, 1934 Meknes, Morocco
- Died: November 20, 2011 (aged 77) Paris, France
- Spouse: Dolly Berdugo
- Parent: Rabbi Shalom Messas
- Occupation: Rabbi
- Awards: Chevalier de la Légion d'honneur

Rabbi David Messas (15 July 1934 in Meknes, Morocco – 20 November 2011 Paris) was the son of Rabbi Chalom Messas, the former Chief Rabbi of Morocco who subsequently became the sefardic Chief Rabbi of Jerusalem. He married Dolly Berdugo. He was Chief rabbi of Geneva for several years, Chief Rabbi of Paris for several terms and was at the same time Head of the Rabbinical Council. He headed the École Maïmonide in Boulogne-Billancourt. He has been the Chief Rabbi of Paris since 1995. He died on Sunday, 20 November 2011 in the morning, after a lengthy illness which did not stop him from active duties. He was 77. A funeral was held Sunday at his synagogue in Paris with the participation of Rabbi Shlomo Amar. His body was then flown for burial at Har HaMenuchot in the City of Jerusalem on Monday, 21 November 2011, beside the grave of his father.

From Alpha Omega, May 2001:

"David Messas has dedicated his life to the pursuit of excellence in Jewish thought and teachings. Son of Rav Shalom Messas, head rabbi of Jerusalem, Rabbi Messas firmly established his background in Jewish studies having studied under the eminent Talmudist Rabbi Isaac Sebbag at the Keter Torah Yeshiva. Rabbi Messas earned degrees in philosophy and general psychology and received several honours, including the Palmes académiques for his service to education and the rank of Chevalier de la Légion d'honneur. Most recently, Rabbi Messas was elected chief rabbi and president of the Rabbinic Council of Paris."
