= Akiba Eisenberg =

Former chief rabbi of Vienna

Dr. Rabbi Akiba Eisenberg
- Title: Chief Rabbi of Vienna

Personal life
- Born: 30 September 1908 Vác, Austria-Hungary
- Died: 8 April 1983 (aged 74) Vienna, Austria

Religious life
- Religion: Judaism

Jewish leader
- Synagogue: Seitenstättengasse

Dr. rabbi Akiba Eisenberg (20 September 1908 – 8 April 1983) was a former Chief Rabbi of Vienna.

== Biography ==
Eisenberg was born in Vác, near Budapest. During World War II, he survived by hiding with his brother in the outlying area with non-Jewish farmers.

In 1948 Eisenberg became the Chief Rabbi of Vienna, after having served as the rabbi of Győr, Hungary. He would establish a Beth Din with the help of the Jewish Agency and advocate as a Zionist while serving this role. He would also be the target of an antisemitic terrorist attack, when a pipe bomb was detonated outside of his home on 4 February 1982.

Eisenberg, working from Seitenstettengasse, the only synagogue in Vienna not destroyed by the Nazis, began Jewish education within the city. In 1969, he was given the title 'Doctor,' by the President of Austria for his work in education.

Eisenberg died on 8 April 1983, at the age of 74, from heart failure, in Vienna. After his death, his son Paul Chaim succeeded him as the Chief Rabbi.
