= Tobias Lewenstein =

Chief Rabbi of Denmark (1903–1910)

- טוביה לבנשטיין
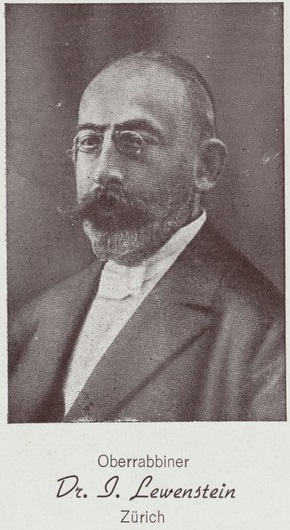
- Title: Chief Rabbi of Denmark (1903–1910); Chief Rabbi IRGZ Zürich (1912–1940)

Personal life
- Born: 26 November 1863 Paramaribo, Surinam
- Died: 22 October 1952 (aged 88) Montreux, Switzerland
- Spouse: Flora Møller (m. 1895)

Religious life
- Religion: Judaism

Jewish leader
- Predecessor: David Simonsen
- Successor: Max Schornstein
- Synagogue: Great Synagogue of Copenhagen
- Began: 1903
- Ended: 1910

Tobias Tuvia Lewenstein (Hebrew: טוביה לבנשטיין; 1863–1952) was Chief Rabbi of Jewish communities in the Netherlands, Denmark, and Switzerland in the late 19th and early 20th centuries.

== Early life and education ==
He was born in Paramaribo, Surinam, to Mozes Judah Lewenstein (1829–1864) and Francisca Fransje Fradche Koetser (b. 1839). His father was chief rabbi of Paramaribo. After his father's death in 1864, Lewenstein's family returned to Leiden in the Netherlands to live with his mother's sister and uncle. The family later moved to Amsterdam where Lewenstein began his rabbinical studies at the Nederlands Israëlietisch Seminarium before studying at the Hildesheimer Rabbinical Seminary in Berlin and then earning his doctorate at the University of Halle in Germany.

== Career ==
In 1895, he returned to the Netherlands to serve as chief rabbi in Leeuwarden and then, in 1899, he became chief rabbi in The Hague.

On 1 May 1903, he was selected by Copenhagen's Community of the Mosaic Faith to succeed David Simonsen as chief rabbi of Denmark. His term there was contentious due to his opposition to interfaith marriage, allowing children born of Jewish fathers and non-Jewish mothers to convert, and participation in a Danish ecumenical national day of prayer, among other issues, and he was removed from the post on 18 January 1910. Because Lewenstein's contract stated the position was a lifetime appointment, his dismissal sparked a legal battle that ended up before the Danish Supreme Court. In the end, Lewenstein was awarded DKK 80,000 in 1912 (equivalent to DKK 5,555,535 in 2022). Between his dismissal and his departure from Copenhagen following the court's ruling, Lewenstein initiated the establishment of a small splinter synagogue, a forerunner to the Machzike Hadas congregation, founded in 1912.

In 1912, Lewenstein became chief rabbi for the Israelitische Religionsgesellschaft, an Orthodox community in Zürich, Switzerland, that split from the Israelitische Cultusgemeinde community in 1898. He remained the chief rabbi there until 1940. From 1919 to 1923, he also served as president of World Agudath Israel. In 1945, he returned to The Hague for a brief time to help the Dutch Jewish community rebuild after World War II.

== Personal life ==
In 1895, Lewenstein married Flora Frumet Møller (1873–1945), the daughter of Alexander Møller and Therese Telzche Heymann.
