= Marchand Ennery =

French rabbi

Rabbi Marchand Ennery
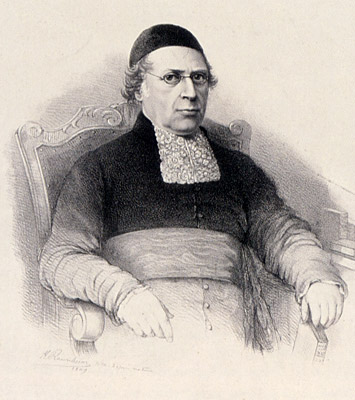
- Portrait by Hermann Raunheim c. 1849
- Title: Chief Rabbi of France

Personal life
- Born: 1792 Nancy, France
- Died: 21 August 1852 (aged 59–60) Paris, France
- Buried: Père Lachaise Cemetery

Religious life
- Religion: Judaism

Jewish leader
- Predecessor: Emmanuel Deutz
- Successor: Salomon Ulmann
- Began: 1846
- Ended: 1852

Marchand Ennery (French pronunciation: [maʁʃɑ̃ ɛnʁi]; (1792 – 21 August 1852) was a French rabbi who served as Chief Rabbi of France from 1846 to 1852. Ennery studied Talmud under Baruch Guggenheim and rabbincs at the rabbinical school of Herz Scheuer, in Mainz.

In 1819, Ennery was appointed director of the new Jewish school of Nancy. He published a Hebrew-French lexicon, Dictionnaire hébreu-français. In 1829 he was appointed chief rabbi of Paris, and he served in this position until his election as Chief Rabbi of France in 1846. He served in the position of Chief Rabbi until his death in 1862. Ennery was succeeded in his role by Salomon Ulmann.

Ennery was inducted as a Chevalier into the Legion of Honor in 1850.

Ennery was the brother of French politician Jonas Ennery.

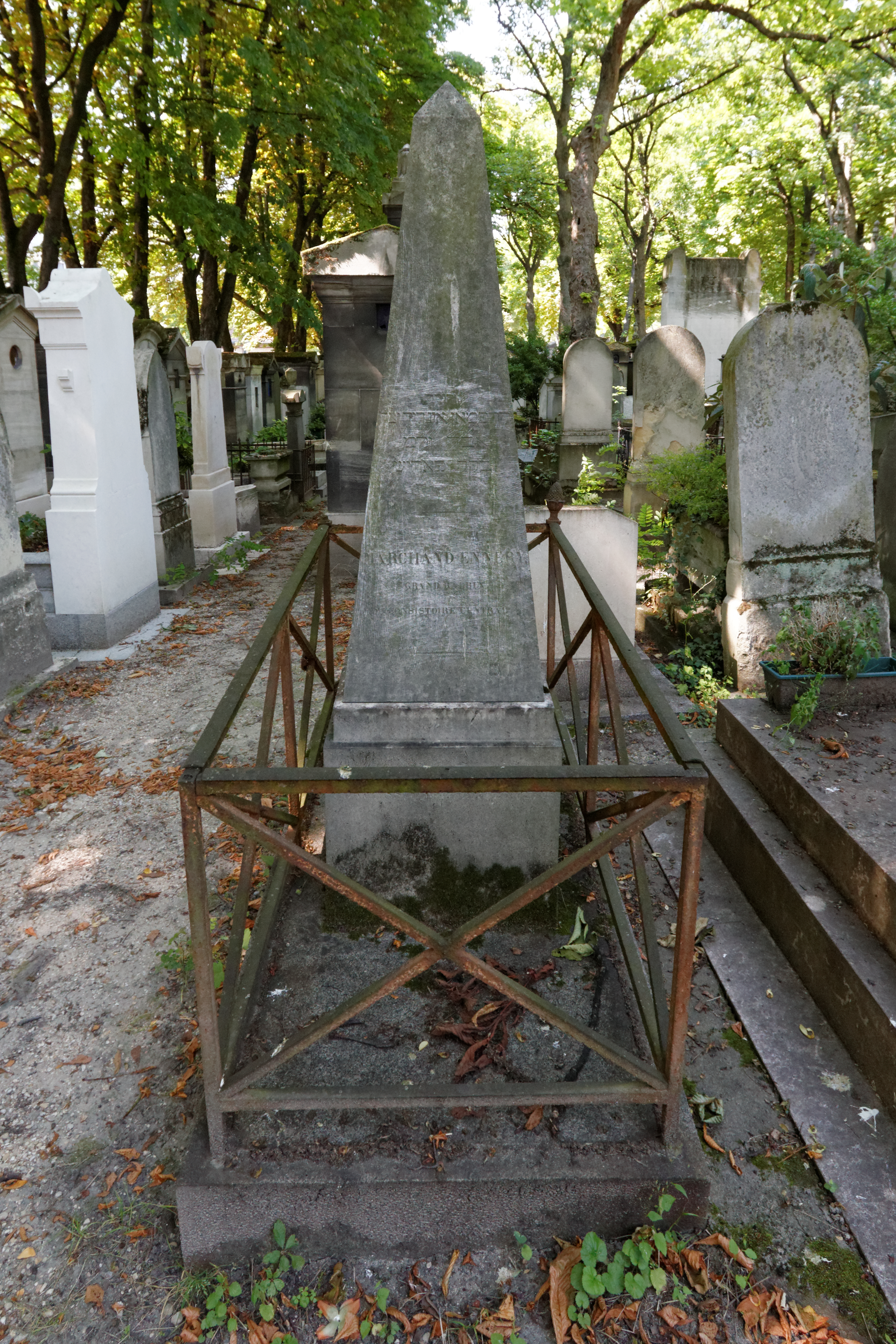
Ennery's grave at Père Lachaise Cemetery, (7th division)

== Publications ==
- Dictionnaire hébreu-français (first edition: 1827), Colbo, 1981
- Dictionnaire de la Bible hébraïque, Colbo, 1996, ISBN 2-85332-178-9
- Lexique hébreu-français, Durlacher, Paris, 1949

== Bibliography ==
- Histoire des Juifs en France, under the direction of Bernhard Blumenkranz, Privat, 1972
- Dictionnaire biographique des rabbins et autres ministres du culte israélite; France et Algérie, du Grand Sanhédrin (1807) à la loi de Séparation(1905) - Berg International Éditeurs, Paris, 2007, notice E37, pages 283–285.
