= Zew Wawa Morejno =

Polish and American rabbi

Zew Wawa Morejno (Hebrew: הרב זאב מורינו, romanized: HaRav Ze'ev Moreino; 28 February 1916 – 19 March 2011) was a Polish and American rabbi. He was the last rabbi of the communist People's Republic of Poland, in 1973 emigrating from Poland to the United States without naming a successor.

== Biography ==
Morejno was born into a Hasidic family in Warsaw. He studied at rabbinical schools in Baranovichi, Mir, Belarus and in Kamieniec Litewski. In 1939 he became a rabbi in Zuprany. He survived the German occupation of Poland, serving as a rabbi in the ghettoes of Ashmyany and Vilnius, and later (1943–44) he was imprisoned in Klooga concentration camp in Estonia.

During the years 1945 and 1946, he served as dean and founder of The Advanced Rabbinical School Netzach Israel in Łódź. From 1948, he served as the Chief Rabbi of Łódź. In 1952, he was removed from this position by the Communist leadership of Łódź over a dispute regarding Jewish cemetery rights in the city.

In 1956, reinstalled as Chief Rabbi of Łódź, he also became the director of the Main Religious Council and the Chief Rabbi of Poland. The following year, however, he was again removed from the position.

Persecuted throughout the 1960s by the Communist party for protesting the destruction of Jewish cemeteries in Poland and for the widespread resurgence of political antisemitism culminating in the mass expulsion of Polish Jews in 1968 (March 1968 events), after the Six-Day War. As the last rabbi of Communist Poland, in 1973 he emigrated to the United States where he became a rabbi in the Hasidic Ger community in Brooklyn, New York. He died in New York on 19 March 2011 aged 95.

== Bibliography ==
- Grabski August, Współczesne życie religijne Żydów w Polsce, in: Studia z dziejów i kultury Żydów w Polsce po 1945 r., Warsaw 1997
