= Gavin Broder =

Former Chief Rabbi of Ireland

Rabbi Gavin Broder

Personal life
- Born: 1963 (age 62–63) Cape Town, South Africa
- Spouse: Daniella Broder
- Children: 4

Religious life
- Religion: Judaism

Jewish leader
- Predecessor: Ephraim Mirvis
- Successor: Yaakov Pearlman
- Position: Chief Rabbi of Ireland
- Began: 16 February 1997
- Ended: October 2000

Gavin Broder (born 1963) is the former Chief Rabbi of Ireland, serving from 1996 to October, 2000. Born in Cape Town, he is the son of Rabbi Irvin Broder who held rabbinic positions in Johannesburg, Wellington, and England. Prior to becoming Chief Rabbi of Ireland, Broder studied at the Gateshed Yeshiva and Jews' College.

Broader was elected Chief Rabbi of Ireland in 1996 at the age of 34. His installation on 16 February 1997 at the Adelaide Road Synagogue was attended by Irish President Mary Robinson, leaders of multiple faiths, and included remarks from then-Chief Rabbi of the United Hebrew Congregations of the Commonwealth Jonathan Sacks.

Under Broder, Ireland expanded its manufacturing of kosher products that met international standards—including of kosher for passover Coca-Cola—and facilitated a variety of youth programs.

Broder left Dublin in October 2000 to become London chaplain of University Jewish Chaplaincy, the Jewish student organization.

== See also ==
- History of the Jews in Ireland

Jewish titles
Preceded by Ephraim Mirvis	Chief Rabbi of Ireland; 1996–2000	Succeeded by Yaakov Pearlman
