= Sheea Herschorn =

Russian-born Canadian Jewish communal leader and posek

Chief Rabbi Sheea Halevy Herschorn

Personal life
- Born: 1893 Krilovitz, Podolian Governorate, Russian Empire
- Died: 15 May 1969 (aged 75–76) Montreal, Quebec, Canada
- Buried: Kehal Israel Memorial Park, Dollard-des-Ormeaux, Quebec
- Spouse: Molly (Malca) Surkes (m. 1922)

Religious life
- Religion: Judaism
- Denomination: Orthodox Judaism

Jewish leader
- Predecessor: Tzvi Hirsch Cohen
- Successor: Pinhas Hirschprung
- Position: Chief Rabbi of Montreal
- Organisation: Vaad Ha‘ir of Montreal
- Began: 1951
- Ended: 1961
- Main work: Mi-Ma‘ayanei Yeshua (1959)

Sheea Halevy Herschorn (Hebrew: יהושע הלוי הירשהאָרן, romanized: Yehoshu‘a ha-Levi Hirshhorn; 1893, Krilovitz – 15 May 1969, Montreal) was a Russian-born Canadian Jewish communal leader and posek, who served as Chief Rabbi of Montreal from 1951 until 1961.

== Biography ==
Sheea Herschorn was born in Krilovitz, Podolia to a rabbinic family, the son of Zissel (née Weitman) and Rabbi Sender Herschorn. He received his main rabbinic training from his father, later studying at the University of Odessa and various yeshivot across Lithuania and Poland. Among his teachers were Rabbis Moshe Nathan Rubinstein (av beit din of Vinnitsa), Leib Braude (av beit din of Lemberg), and Avraham Tzvi Perlmutter. He was ordained at the age of 19, and went on to serve on the rabbinical council of his hometown.

Herschorn fled to Warsaw in 1919, amid the wave of anti-Jewish massacres that began in Ukraine after the First World War. He emigrated to Montreal, Canada, in the summer of 1921, where he had relatives, and occupied the pulpit at Temple Solomon. From March 1926 he also served as rabbi of Congregation Beth David, and soon concurrently at Congregation Beth Yitzchak.

Herschorn was a founding member of the Montreal Jewish Community Council (Va’ad ha-‘Ir), inaugurated in late 1922, and its Orthodox Rabbinical Council (Va’ad ha-Rabbanim). A schism within the group led him, vice president Rabbi Yudel Rosenberg, and a group of shoḥtim to secede from the Council and form the United Synagogue in February 1923. The two organizations re-merged in December 1925, and Herschorn ultimately became the rabbinate's vice president in 1936. Herschorn was appointed president of the Rabbinical Council in 1951, succeeding Hirsch Cohen as Chief Rabbi of Montreal.

In 1959, Herschorn published his best known work, Mi-Ma’ayanei Yeshua (lit. 'Wellsprings of Salvation'), a collection of responsa to Halakhic queries, prefaced by a haskama from Rabbi Chaim Ozer Grodzinski.

He died on 15 May 1969 (28 Iyar 5729), and was buried in an ohel at the Kehal Israel Memorial Park in Dollard-des-Ormeaux.

== Personal life ==
Sheea Herschorn married Molly (Malca) Surkes on 7 July 1922. They had one son, Michael Julius (Meshulam Jehuda), a professor at McGill University's Department of Mathematics from 1958 until his retirement in 1998.

Herschorn's father, sister Sarah, and her husband and son were murdered in the Holocaust in 1941.

== Partial bibliography ==
- Herschorn, Sheea (1959). Mi-Ma'ayanei Yeshua: Teshuvot le-Halakha ve-Pilpulim [Memainey Jeshuah: Responda and Treatises on Talmudic Law] (in Hebrew). Montreal.
