= Meir Ashkenazi (rabbi) =

Former Chief Rabbi of Shanghai

Rabbi Meir Ashkenazi
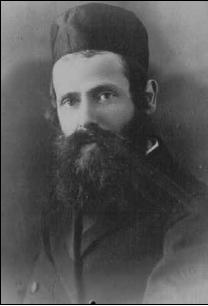

Personal life
- Born: December 25-26, 1891 Chernihiv, Russian Empire
- Died: August 25, 1954 (aged 62) New York, United States
- Buried: Queens, New York, United States
- Children: Moshe Ashkenazi

Religious life
- Religion: Judaism
- Denomination: Chabad
- Semikhah: Rabbi Tzvi Tumarkin, Rabbi Chaim Eliezer Soloveitchik

Rabbi Meir Ashkenazi (Hebrew: מאיר אשכנזי) was a Chabad rabbi who served as chief Rabbi of Shanghai from 1926 to 1949.

== Early life ==
Ashkenazi was born to Shneur Zalman and Kayla (Zislin), Chabad Chasidim in Chernihiv. He was taught by his brothers and teachers in his hometown before leaving to study in Lubavitch at the Tomchei Tmimim yeshiva where he studied for a year despite contracting typhoid fever. He received semicha from Rabbi Tzvi Tumarkin and from Rabbi Chaim Eliezer Soloveitchik, the rabbi of the city and his future father in law. In 1914 he got engaged to Toiba Liba Soloveitchik but the wedding was postponed due to his enlistment in the Russian army during World War I.

== Rabbinic positions ==
=== Vladivostok ===
He was appointed as rabbi of Vladivostok. In 1919 his future father in law fled to Harbin in Manchuria due to the spread of communism. He then married his wife in Harbin before returning to Vladivostok where he continued to serve as rabbi until 1926.

=== Shanghai ===
In 1926, with the help of Jewish communist youth he had hosted in his home, he received exit visas to leave the Soviet Union for the United States of America. He planned to accept a position in Boston. En route to America he passed through Shanghai, China where Jewish community residents requested that he remain there and be appointed rabbi. Based on the direction of his rabbi, Rabbi Yosef Yitzchak Schneersohn, he accepted the offer and became the chief rabbi of Shanghai.

In 1927 he encouraged the creation of a larger space for the existing Ohel Moshe Synagogue. Today the synagogue is the Shanghai Jewish Refugees Museum where there is an exhibit dedicated to Ashkenazi's life and tenure as chief rabbi.

In 1934 his parents brought his son Moshe to Israel to study in Yeshivas Toras Emes in Shikun Chabad.

In 1939 Rabbi Ashkenazi helped set up a Talmud Torah for Jewish children. By 1941 it had 120 students and its height had 300 students. He also established a yeshiva ketana headed by his son-in-law, Rabbi Hershel Milner.

During the Holocaust, Ashkenazi assisted the thousands of Jews fleeing the Nazis that arrived in Shanghai as refugees. He also helped arrange weddings for the yeshiva students who became engaged during their time in Shanghai. Ashkenazi also collected funds for the yeshivas as well as being the preferred distribution channel for funds from elsewhere.

In 1949, after the majority of the refugees had left Shanghai and the Jewish community dwindled, Askenazi moved to Crown Heights, Brooklyn.

== Death ==
Ashkenazi died in 1954 and is buried in the Montefiore Cemetery in Queens, New York.

== Sources ==
- Falbaum, Berl, ed. (2005). Shanghai Remembered: Stories of Jews who Escaped to Shanghai from Nazi Europe. Momentum Books. ISBN 1879094738.
