= Moses Israel =

Chief Rabbi of Cairo and Alexandria (died in 1802)

Moses Israel (died in 1802) served as chief rabbi of Alexandria from 1784 to 1802, and was appointed Chief Rabbi of Cairo in 1801. He was a member of the Israel family, which produced chief rabbis for nearly one hundred years, from about 1730 to 1830. His father Haim Abraham Israel and his uncle Reuben Eliyahu Israel had also headed the rabbinates of Cairo and Alexandria several years earlier. At the time, the Jews of Egypt had no countrywide organization. The authority of the Chief Rabbinate of Cairo extended to the Jewish communities of Port Said, Mansoura, Banha and Mit Ghamr, whereas Tanta, Damanhur and Kafr El-Zayat were under the jurisdiction of the Chief Rabbinate of Alexandria.

== See also ==
- History of the Jews in Egypt

Jewish titles
Preceded by Reuben Eliyahu Israel	Chief Rabbi of Alexandria; 1784–1802	Succeeded by Yedidiah Solomon Israel
