= Moritz Grünwald =

Bulgarian Chief Rabbi (1853–1895)

- Born: 20 March 1853; Uherské Hradiště, Moravia, Austrian Empire
- Died: 10 June 1895 (aged 42); London, United Kingdom
- Education: Leipzig University; Jewish Theological Seminary of Breslau; University of Vienna
- Occupation: Chief Rabbi of Bulgaria
- Years active: 1881–1895

Moritz Grünwald (also spelled Greenwald; 20 March 1853 – 10 June 1895) was the Chief Rabbi in the cities of Bjelovar, Písek, and Mladá Boleslav, and later served as Chief Rabbi for the Principality of Bulgaria. Additionally, he was a writer and editor who wrote about the history of Jews and on linguistics of Jewish languages.

== Early life and education ==
Grünwald was born in Uherské Hradiště in the Austrian Empire (now the Czech Republic). He attended both the University of Vienna and the Leipzig University, attaining degrees in philosophy and theology. In 1881, he was ordained as a rabbi by the Jewish Theological Seminary of Breslau, and appointed Chief Rabbi of Bjelovar in modern-day Croatia. From 1884 and 1893, he served as Chief Rabbi in the cities of Písek and Mladá Boleslav in Bohemia.

== Career ==
In 1891, Dr. Szymon Dankowicz, the Chief Rabbi of Bulgaria, was forced to resign after a dispute with the Minister of Foreign Affairs and Religions, Dimitar Grekov, and 2 years later, Grünwald was appointed to the position for a three-year term, during which the Jewish education revolution in Bulgaria began. In his position, he was very involved in education, and wrote a guide for Jewish teachers and instructed faculty in the schools in the community, while simultaneously conducting research on the history of Bulgarian Jewry, traveling the land and examining tombstones and archaeological sites. During his tenure, regulations for his position were amended, stating 3 qualifications:

- Must be a graduate of a rabbinical seminary and hold a doctorate degree
- Be at least 35 years old
- Served at least 5 years as a rabbi or teacher at a seminary
- Be elected by the Jewish Consistory of Bulgaria with 75% or more of the vote

=== Writings ===
During his tenure, many anti-Semitic incidents occurred in Bulgaria, and Grünwald , in response, published a number of articles in Bulgarian newspapers. According to many sources, he was disappointed by the intrigues within Bulgarian Jewry, which interfered with his work, and he asked to leave his position before reaching the end of his term.

As a Yiddish philologist, he embraced a German identity within Ashkenazi Jewish language. He stated that it should be considered "analogous to other German dialects". Taking interest in Sephardic Jewry, he also published a monograph of Judezmo in 1882, the first to do so. For over a decade, he was an editor for Das jüdische Centralblatt auch Archiv für die Geschichte der Juden in Böhmen

== Final years and family ==
In June 1895, he left for London after a job offer for a rabbinical position to replace Dr. Mayer Lerner in the Federation of Synagogues. Soon into his visit, he fell ill and died at the age of 42. His sudden death was mourned with great feeling in Bulgaria, as he was still very popular there. Grünwald was buried in the Jewish cemetery in Edmonton, London. He left behind a large bibliography, including books on the history of Bohemian Jews and on rabbis, such as Shlomo Ephraim Luntschitz.

Some of his direct descendants immigrated to Ibiza in 1932 and later fought in the Spanish Civil War on the side of the Republican faction
