= Lody van de Kamp =

- Title: Rabbi

Religious life
- Religion: Judaism
- Denomination: Orthodox Judaism

Lody van de Kamp (born 1948) is a Dutch Orthodox Jewish rabbi and writer known for his social activism and critique.

== Early and personal life ==
Van de Kamp's father spent two years in Auschwitz, but survived. His mother hid in the Netherlands for the duration of the Holocaust.

As of 2018, van de Kamp was living in Amsterdam. He wears a kippah. He is married, and has five children.

== Career ==
Van de Kamp has been a communal rabbi of The Hague (since 1981), Amsterdam (since 1988), and Rotterdam (since August 1994).

In 1995, van de Kamp joined the centrist Christian Democratic Appeal (CDA) party as a political candidate. He left the party in 2017 after feeling party leaders held anti-Muslim sentiments.

In 2010, van de Kamp was working as the director of an Orthodox Jewish school in Amsterdam.

== Activism ==
=== Jewish advocacy ===
In 2012, van de Kamp, as a representative of the Haredi group the Council for Ritual Slaughter, criticized a deal between the government and "Holland's top rabbis" regarding restrictions on kosher slaughter. He asserted that any restrictions constituted "an unacceptable infringement on religious freedom".

In 2013, he told Jewish Telegraphic Agency that "Jewish communities don’t want to mistakenly be regarded as an extension of the political State of Israel...Any involvement from the state in religious issues in the Diaspora communities’ work in that way [is] counterproductive".

=== Interfaith advocacy ===
Van de Kamp became involved in interfaith and anti-radicalization activism in the early 2010s, after a teenage boy who had made the Nazi salute to him was arrested. Van de Kamp learned the boy had been ignorant of the gesture's meaning and history, and responded positively to van de Kamp, who took him to visit the Anne Frank House. Since 2010, he has worked with Saïd Bensellam, a Moroccan-Dutch Muslim activist, on education programs. The two founded the Saïd and Lody foundation to further their work. In 2024, the two men jointly won the Truus Wijsmuller Prize from the Wijsmuller-Meijer foundation.

Van de Kamp has spoken at a number of lectures and events to educate audiences on Judaism and the Israel-Palestine conflict. He has criticized the Israeli military occupation of the West Bank, arguing it has further destabilized society there. He is a member of the Muslim Jewish Leadership Council.

Van de Kamp has criticized suggestions that antisemitism in the Netherlands is primarily perpetuated by Dutch Muslims. Furthermore, he has said that vilifying the Dutch Muslim community actually leads to greater rates of antisemitism.

In 2019, he and Oumaima Al Abdellaoui, a Moroccan-Dutch Muslim teenager, published the book Over Muren Heen: Een persoonlijke briefwisseling. The book is a compilation of letters between the two on religion and life.

=== Afro-Dutch advocacy ===
Van de Kamp has written and spoken on the involvement of Dutch Jews with the transatlantic slave trade, and believes that historical involvement necessitates that modern Dutch Jews advocate for the Afro-Dutch community.

Van de Kamp has criticized the use of blackface in the Dutch Christmas tradition of Zwarte Piet.

== Books ==
=== Novels ===
- Blijf daar, kom niet. 2006. ISBN 978-90-239-9183-0.
- Oorlogstranen. 2008. ISBN 978-90-239-9266-0.
- Alleen (in Dutch). Mozaïek. 2010. ISBN 978-90-239-9321-6.
- Weeskinderen. Boekencentrum. 2012-04-03. ISBN 978-90-239-1905-6.
- De Joodse slaaf [The Jewish Slave]. 2014. ISBN 9789023994626.
- Sara, het meisje dat op transport ging. Zoetermeer: Uitgeverij Mozaïek. 2017. ISBN 978-90-239-9686-6.
- De typiste (in Dutch). VBK Media. 2024-02-22. ISBN 978-90-297-3639-8.

=== Short stories ===
- Florijn, Els; van deKamp, Lody; Boter, Iris, eds. (2011-10-21). "Jodenman". Lichtjes in je ogen: kerstverhalen (in Dutch). Boekencentrum. ISBN 978-90-239-1956-8.

=== Non-fiction ===
- Het was maar kort: over de Joodse Gemeenten in Nederland. 1994. ISBN 90-239-0743-4.
- Als de mezoeze maar goed zit...: een briefwisseling tussen rabbijn Lody B. van de Kamp en Dick Houwaart. 1994. ISBN 90-242-8381-7., with Dick Houwaart
- Dagboek van een verdoofd rabbijn. Persoonlijke notities bij een politieke aardverschuiving. 2012. ISBN 9789023920434.
- Joden en christenen. 2013. ISBN 9789063536664., with Christian theologian Willem Ouweneel
- Over Muren Heen: Een persoonlijke briefwisseling. 2019. ISBN 978 90 239 5675 4., with Oumaima Al Abdellaoui
