= Yitshak Ehrenberg =

Chief rabbi

Haim Yitshak Ehrenberg (Hebrew: חיים יצחק ארנברג), born February 10, 1950, in Jerusalem, is Orthodox Rabbi of Berlin, Germany. He previously served as Rabbi of Munich, Germany (1990-1997).

== Biography ==
Ehrenberg was born on February 10, 1950, in Jerusalem. His parents, Yechiel Michel and Tzipora Ehrenberg, were born in Israel to chassidic families which had been in Israel for many generations.

When he was 5, the family moved from Yaffa to Bnei Braq where he grew up. His father was a businessman in the diamond processing industry.

Ehrenberg is the second of three sons. His older brother, Jaakov, still resides in Bnei Braq. His younger brother, Moshe Pinchas Ehrenberg, died 1987 in a car crash near Petach Tikva, Israel.

After his bar mitzvah, he went to study in Yeshivat Hasharon, a yeshiva ktana, and afterwards at the age of 16, he decided to join the Yeshivat "Harey Yehuda" in Beit Meir near Jerusalem. The Rosh Yeshiva (and founder) of "Harey Yehuda" and later his father-in-law, Rabbi Tzvi Kahana (1921-1996), was to become his main influence and spiritual mentor who shaped Ehrenberg in his early years.

In 1970, Ehrenberg married Nechama, the first daughter of the Rosh Yeshiva and the couple moved to the city of Ashkelon.

In 1975, after a five-year program of studies, teachings and social activism as part of a talmudic institution in Ashkelon, Ehrenberg was ordained as Rabbi by the Chief Rabbi of Ashkelon, Rabbi Yosef Chaim Blau.

Following his ordination in 1975, Ehrenberg returned to "Harey Yehuda" in Beit Meir to become teacher in the Yeshiva. During this period he also took an active role together with Rabbi Kahana in the administration of the Yeshiva.

== Rabbinical career ==
In 1983, Ehrenberg moved to Vienna, Austria, where he first served as Rabbi of the Mizrachi community, a position which he held until 1989. In 1989, Ehrenberg moved with his family to Munich, Germany, where he served as Rabbi between the years 1989 and 1997. Since 1997, Rabbi Ehrenberg has been Orthodox Jewish Community Rabbi of Berlin, Germany.

Rabbi Ehrenberg is a member of the Conference of European Rabbis standing committee. In 2003, Rabbi Ehrenberg co-founded the ORD (Orthodox Rabbi-Conference of Germany) which goal it has been to facilitate the cooperation of German Rabbis for a continuous development of Jewish Orthodox life in Germany. Ehrenberg served as Chairman of the ORD from its establishment until 2010.
