= Salomon Ulmann =

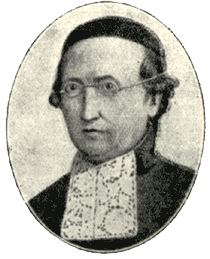
Salomon Ulmann

Salomon Ulmann (February 25, 1806 at Saverne, Bas-Rhin – May 5, 1865 in Paris), was a French rabbi.

He commenced his rabbinical studies at Strasburg under Moïse Bloch (better known as Rabbi Mosche Utenheim), and was the first pupil enrolled at the initial competitive examination of candidates for the École Centrale Rabbinique (Séminaire israélite de France or SIF), inaugurated in July, 1830. He was also the first in his class at this institution to receive the diploma of chief rabbi. In 1834 he was appointed rabbi of Lauterbourg, Alsace; in 1844 he became chief rabbi of Nancy, in Lorraine; and in 1853 he succeeded Marchand Ennery as chief rabbi of the Central Consistory of the Israelites of France.

Ulmann published a limited number of sermons and pastoral letters, and was the author also of Catéchisme, ou Éléments d'Instruction Religieuse et Morale à l'Usage des Jeunes Israélites (Strasburg, 1845; 3rd ed., Paris, 1871), which is considered a classic.

The most important act in Ulmann's rabbinical career was the organization of the Central Conference of the Chief Rabbis of France, over whose deliberations he presided at Paris in May, 1856. In that year Ulmann addressed a "Pastoral Letter to the Faithful of the Jewish Religion," in which he set forth the result of the deliberations of the conference, which were as follows:

1. revision and abbreviation of the piyyutim;
2. the introduction of a regular system of preaching;
3. the introduction of the organ into synagogues;
4. the organization of religious instruction;
5. the institution of the rite of confirmation for the Jewish youth of both sexes;
6. a resolution for the transfer of the École Centrale Rabbinique from Metz to Paris.
