= Joseph Hirsch Dünner =

Dutch Jewish leader and scholar (1833–1911)

Chief Rabbi Dr. Joseph Hirsch Dünner
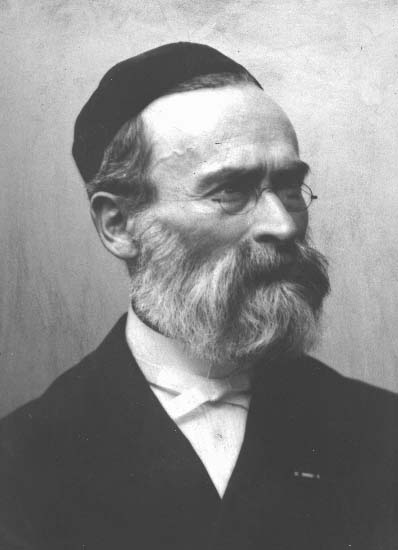

Personal life
- Born: 11 January 1833 Kraków, Congress Poland
- Died: 13 October 1911 (aged 78) Amsterdam, Kingdom of the Netherlands
- Education: University of Heidelberg

Religious life
- Religion: Judaism

Joseph Hirsch Dünner (Hebrew: יוסף צבי הלוי דינר, romanized: Yosef Tzvi Dunner; 11 January 1833 – 13 October 1911), also known as Ha-Ritzad (הריצ״ד), was a Dutch Jewish leader and scholar, who served as Chief Rabbi of Amsterdam and North Holland.

== Biography ==
Dünner was born in Kraków, Poland, in 1833. He received his rabbinical education in his native city, and studied philosophy and Oriental philology at Bonn and Heidelberg. He received a PhD from the latter institution with a thesis on Abraham ibn Ezra.

In 1862 he was called from Bonn to the rectorate of the Nederlands Israëlietisch Seminarium in Amsterdam. His ability soon made it famous as a school of Jewish theology, ancient languages, and religious philosophy. In 1874 he was made Chief Rabbi of the Amsterdam community and of the province of North Holland, and though was strictly Orthodox, no dissension has marred his administration. The government recognized his ability and activity by decorating him with the Order of the Lion of the Netherlands.

Dünner is known for his studies on the Halakha of the Tannaic period, and by his critical work on the Tosefta. He argued that the Tosefta was compiled after the completion of the Talmud by a redactor who drew on authentic Tannaitic material and earlier baraitot. This view anticipated Hanoch Albeck's later thesis on the Tosefta. Dünner's commentary on the Babylonian Talmud, republished as Ḥidushei ha-Ritzad by Mossad HaRav Kook, was among the first modern academic commentaries of the Talmud.

Together with Meijer Roest, he founded the Nieuw Israëlietisch Weekblad (1865) and the Israëlietische Nieuwsbode (1875). He also acquired a reputation as an orator, and contributed to the Joodsch Letterkundige Bijdragen, Monatsschrift, Weekblad voor Israeliten, and Israelitische Letterbode.

His great nephew, Josef Hirsch Dünner, was named after him.

== Publications ==
- Die Zionisten: Rede gehalten am 2. Neujahrstage 5658 bei dem Morgengottesdienst der grossen Synagoge (in German). 1898.
- Die Theorien über Wesen und Ursprung der Tosephtha, Kritisch Dargestellt (in German). Amsterdam: Seyffardt'sche Buchhandlung. 1874. hdl:2027/osu.32435031599657.
- Glossen (Haggahot) zum Babylonischen und Palästinensischen Talmud (in Hebrew). Vol. 1–4. Frankfurt. 1896–1903. Republished as Ḥidushei ha-Ritzad.
- Kritische und Erläuternde Anmerkungen zu Bedarschi's Chotham Tochnit. Amsterdam. 1865.
- Leerredenen. Vol. 1–5. Amsterdam. 1897–1901.
- Het Zionisme: leerrede gehouden op Sabbath Nachamoe 5665, ter nieuwe synagoge te Amsterdam (in Dutch). The Hague: Drukkerij Levisson. 1905.
- Hagahot al Mishne Torah, hu ha-yad ha-ḥazakah leha-Rambam (in Hebrew). Amsterdam: Hotsa'at Menaḥem Hertsberger. 1929.
