= Moses Gomez de Mesquita =

Dutch hakham (1688–1751)

Ḥakham Moses Gomez de Mesquita

Personal life
- Born: 1688 Amsterdam, Dutch Republic
- Died: May 8, 1751 (aged 62–63) London, Great Britain

Religious life
- Religion: Judaism

Moses Gomez de Mesquita (1688 – May 8, 1751) was ḥakham of the Spanish and Portuguese Jews of London.

== Biography ==
Mesquita was born and trained in Amsterdam, where between 1729 and 1743 he was a regular contributor to the monthly Pri Ets Haim responsa journal. His original printed responsa can be accessed at pehh, a digitized version at dicta. He was appointed ḥakham in London in 1744, in succession to Isaac Nieto, who had resigned, and held the office until his death. He solemnized the second marriage of Isaac Nieto in 1747, and the marriage of his own daughter, in 1749, to Moses Cohen d'Azevedo, who became ḥakham in 1760.

He died on May 8, 1751, at the age of sixty-three. (Note: May 6, according to The London Magazine.) At his funeral, Nieto and Aaron Hart of the Great Synagogue gave graveside addresses.
