= Lazare Isidor =

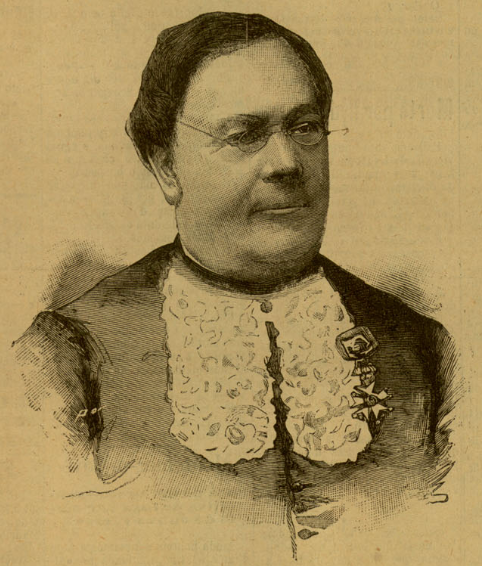
An 1888 engraving of Isidor

Lazare Isidor (French pronunciation: [lazaʁ izidɔʁ]; 1806–1888) was a French rabbi who served as chief rabbi of the Israelite Central Consistory of France during the latter half of the nineteenth century.

== Early career ==
Isidor served as chief rabbi of Paris from 1847 until 1867.

During this period, he was a supporter of Jewish emancipation and the integration of his people into French society: he stated that "'we have shown that we were worthy of liberty, worthy of the title of citizen, and that it was possible to be at once a Jew and a Frenchman'".

== Chief Rabbi of France ==
Isidor was elected chief rabbi of France in 1867 and remained in the position until his death. Isidor was succeeded by Zadoc Kahn, who had become chief rabbi of Paris following his election to the higher post.

Following the 1871 annexation of Alsace-Lorraine after the Franco-Prussian War, France lost around forty separate rabbinates in the area, resulting in a large number of unemployed rabbis throughout the country. Isidor secured permission for the foundation of rabbinates across France to replace these missing communities: the new positions were combined with that of the hazzan due to how "unimportant" the towns were seen as being. However, most of these new rabbinates eventually decided to split the role of rabbi and hazzan again.

Isidore was responsible for adapting the prayer in the memory of the dead which occurred at the start of Mincha on Yom Kippur. His traditional prayer was adopted by rabbis across France and "acquired exceptional importance". Another widely used prayer of his was composed for funeral services. Many of the prayers edited by Isidor were translated into French and departed from the original Hebrew texts.

In 1882, he gave permission for Henry Joseph, an English businessman, to become chief rabbi of Argentina.

== Other work ==
In 1875, Isidor became president of Léon de Rosny's Société d'ethnographie (Ethnographic Society).
