= Pinchas Hirschprung =

Polish-Canadian rabbi, posek and rosh yeshiva

Chief Rabbi Pinchas Hirschprung
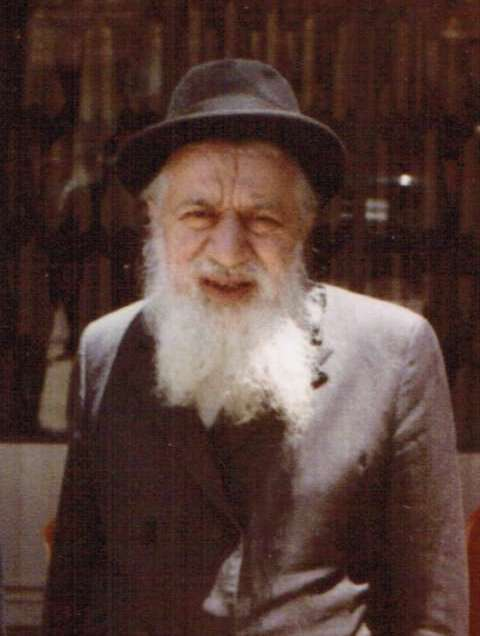

Personal life
- Born: July 13, 1912 Dukla, Kingdom of Galicia and Lodomeria, Austro-Hungarian Empire
- Died: January 25, 1998 (aged 85) Montreal, Quebec, Canada
- Education: Yeshivas Chachmei Lublin

Religious life
- Religion: Judaism

Jewish leader
- Predecessor: Sheea Herschorn
- Successor: Avraham David Niznik
- Position: Chief Rabbi of Montreal
- Organisation: Vaad Ha‘Ir of Montreal
- Began: 1969
- Ended: January 25, 1998

Pinchas Hirschprung (Hebrew: פנחס הירשפרונג; 13 July 1912, Dukla, Galicia – 25 January 1998, Montreal, Canada) was a Polish-Canadian rabbi, posek, and rosh yeshiva, who served as Chief Rabbi of Montreal from 1969 until his death.

== Biography ==
=== Early life ===
Pinchas Hirschprung was born in 1912 to Leah (née Zehmin) and Rabbi Chaim Hirschprung in the Galician shtetl Dukla (now located in Poland). His grandfather, Rabbi Dovid Tzvi (Tevli) Zehmin, a Chortkov Chasid best known for his work Sefer Minchat Soles, served as the town's av beit din. Zehmin was the teacher of Rebbes Yekusiel Yehudah Halberstam and Yaakov Leiser of the Klausenburg and Pshevorsk Chasidic dynasties, respectively. Through his maternal great-grandfather, Yosef Moshe Teicher, Hirschprung was a direct descendant of Solomon Luria and Saul Wahl Katzenellenbogen.

Hirschprung received his early religious education from his grandfather, later becoming a student of Rabbi Meir Shapiro at Yeshivas Chachmei Lublin. He purportedly wrote his first sefer, Pri Pinchas, at the age of 13, and, according to Rabbi Shapiro, knew all 2,711 folio pages of the Talmud by heart as a youth. He also became proficient in Polish, German, and Latin. Rabbi Shapiro said about him, "It would have been worth opening the Yeshivah (of Chachmei Lublin) just for Pinchas from Dukla". Hirschprung began teaching at the Yeshiva after his ordination in 1932, and became its head of admissions upon Shapiro's death the following October.

At the beginning of World War II, Rabbi Hirschprung smuggled himself from Nazi-occupied Poland into Lithuania. From there, he escaped to Kobe, Japan, where he remained for nine months. He left for Shanghai in the fall of 1941, and from there for North America, finally arriving in Montreal on 23 October 1941.

=== Career ===
Not long after his arrival in Canada, Rabbi Hirschprung accepted the positions of rabbi of the Adath Yeshurun Synagogue on Saint Urbain Street, and of rosh yeshiva at the newly founded Yeshivas Merkaz HaTorah. He also became involved in the affairs of the Va'ad ha-Ir (Jewish Community Council) of Montreal. In 1944, he published an autobiographical memoir of his escape from Europe, serialized from May to August in the Yiddish daily Der Keneder Adler and published in book form later that year.

In 1953, Rabbi Hirschprung re-established Montreal's Bais Yaakov school for girls, which was renamed Bais Yaakov d'Rav Hirschprung in his honour after his death. He was named rosh yeshiva of Tomchei Tmimim Lubavitch in 1965, and in 1969 succeeded Sheea Herschorn as Chief Rabbi of Montreal.

Rabbi Hirschprung died on 25 January 1998. His wife, Alta Chaya Hirschprung, died on 4 March 2012. They are both buried in the Chesed Shel Emes Cemetery in Montreal.

== Selected publications ==
- Fun Natsishen yomertol: zikhroynes fun a polit [From the Nazi Vale of Tears: Memoirs of a Refugee] (in Yiddish). Montreal: The Eagle Publishing Co. 1944. Published in English as The Vale of Tears (Azrieli Foundation, 2018).
- Kuntres Pnei Shelomo (in Hebrew). Montreal: The Eagle Publishing Co. 1967.

Jewish titles
Preceded by Sheea Herschorn	Chief Rabbi of Montreal; 1969–1998	Succeeded by Avraham David Niznik
