= Yakir Gueron =

Ottoman rabbi (1813–1874)

Personal life
- Born: 1813
- Died: February 4, 1874 (aged 60–61) Jerusalem, Ottoman Empire
- Known for: Sixth rabbi of Adrianople from the Gueron family, acting chief rabbi of Constantinople
- Other name: Preciado Gueron
- Occupation: Rabbi

Religious life
- Religion: Judaism

Yakir Gueron or Preciado Gueron (1813 – February 4, 1874 in Jerusalem) was a Turkish rabbi. He was the sixth rabbi of Adrianople descended from the Gueron family. He became rabbi in 1835 at the age of twenty-two, and eleven years later met Sultan Abd al-Majid, whom he induced to restore the privileges formerly conceded to the non-Muslim communities. Gueron, with the rabbis of İzmir and Seres, was made an arbitrator in a rabbinical controversy at Constantinople, and was chosen acting chief rabbi of the Turkish capital in 1863. Both Abdulmecid I and his successor Abdülaziz conferred decorations upon him.

Gueron resigned his office in 1872, and proceeded to Jerusalem, where he died two years later.
