= Jonathan Markovitch =

Chief Rabbi of Kyiv

Rabbi Jonathan Markovitch
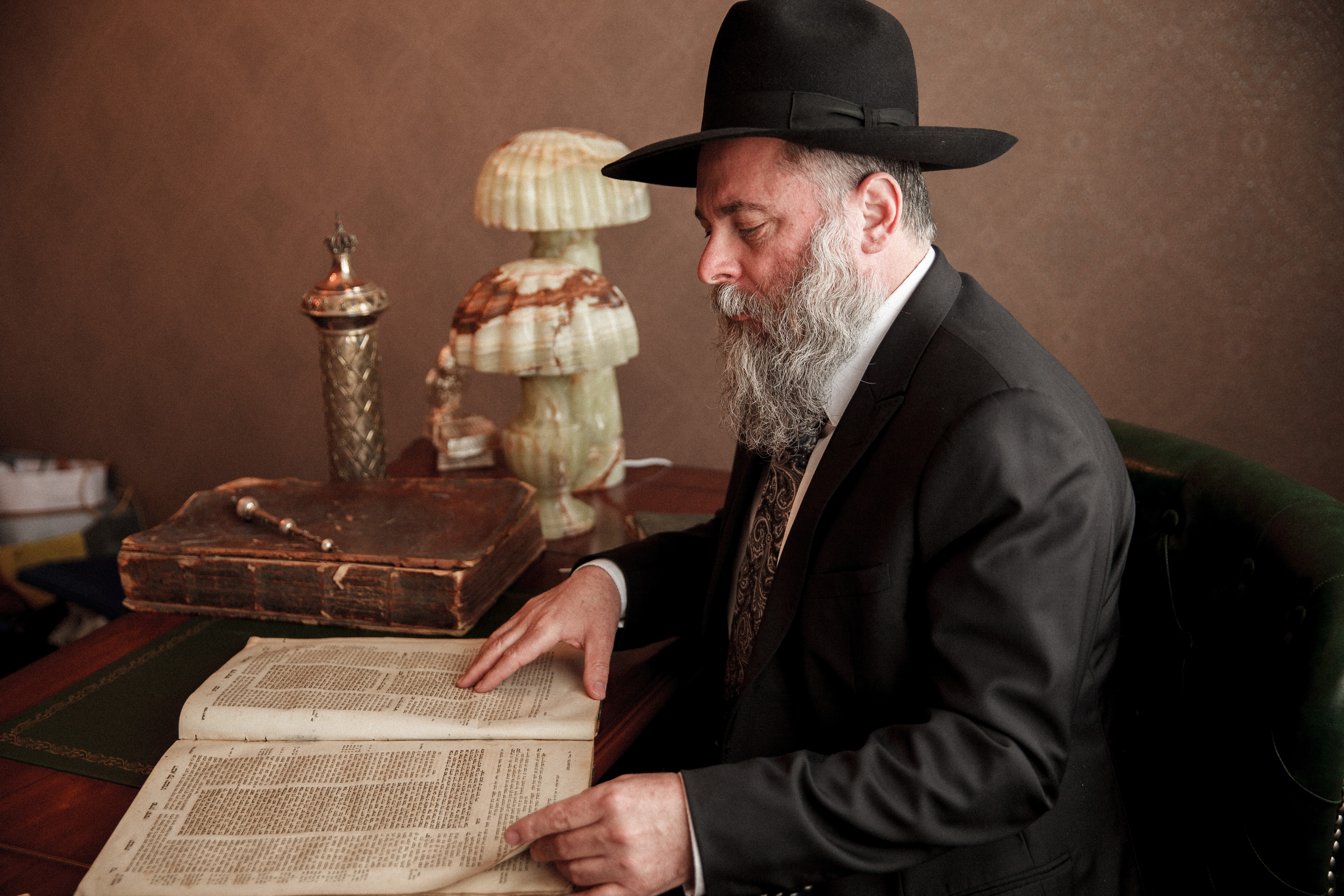
- Title: Chief Rabbi of Kyiv

Personal life
- Born: 21 October 1967 (age 58) Uzhhorod, Ukrainian SSR, Soviet Union (now Uzhhorod, Zakarpattia Oblast, Ukraine)
- Spouse: Elka Inna

Religious life
- Religion: Judaism
- Denomination: Chabad

Jewish leader
- Synagogue: Beit Menachem
- Began: 2000
- Residence: Kyiv, Ukraine
- Semikhah: Rav Ovadia Yosef

Rabbi Jonathan Benyamin Markovitch (Ukrainian: Йонатан Бін'ямін Маркович, romanized: Yonatan Biniamin Markovych; born 21 October 1967) is the Chief Rabbi of Kyiv, the principal Chabad emissary in the city, and the Rabbi of Ukraine's prison system.

== Biography ==
Rabbi Markovitch was born in 1967 in Uzhhorod (Ukraine), into a rabbinic family. His maternal grandfather, Rabbi Yechezkel Feivel Oestreicher, served as a rabbi and shochet in the city.

At the age of three, his family immigrated to Israel. During his youth, he studied at a Chabad Talmud Torah and later attended the Chabad Yeshiva in Kiryat Gat. He continued his studies at the Kfar Ganim Yeshiva under Rabbi Zucker.

In 1985, Rabbi Markovitch enlisted in the Israeli Air Force, where he served for 12 years as an aircrew officer, achieving the rank of major before being discharged.

He received rabbinic ordination from Rabbi Ovadia Yosef, the Chief Military Rabbinate, Rabbi Eliyahu Abergel, and several prominent Chabad Rabbis, including Rabbi Levi Bistritzky of Zefat and Rabbi Yitzchak Yehuda Yeruslavsky.

In addition to his Torah studies, Rabbi Markovitch holds a bachelor's degree in computer science from the Technion in Haifa and a master's degree in education from the Hebrew University of Jerusalem.

== Chief Rabbi of Kyiv ==
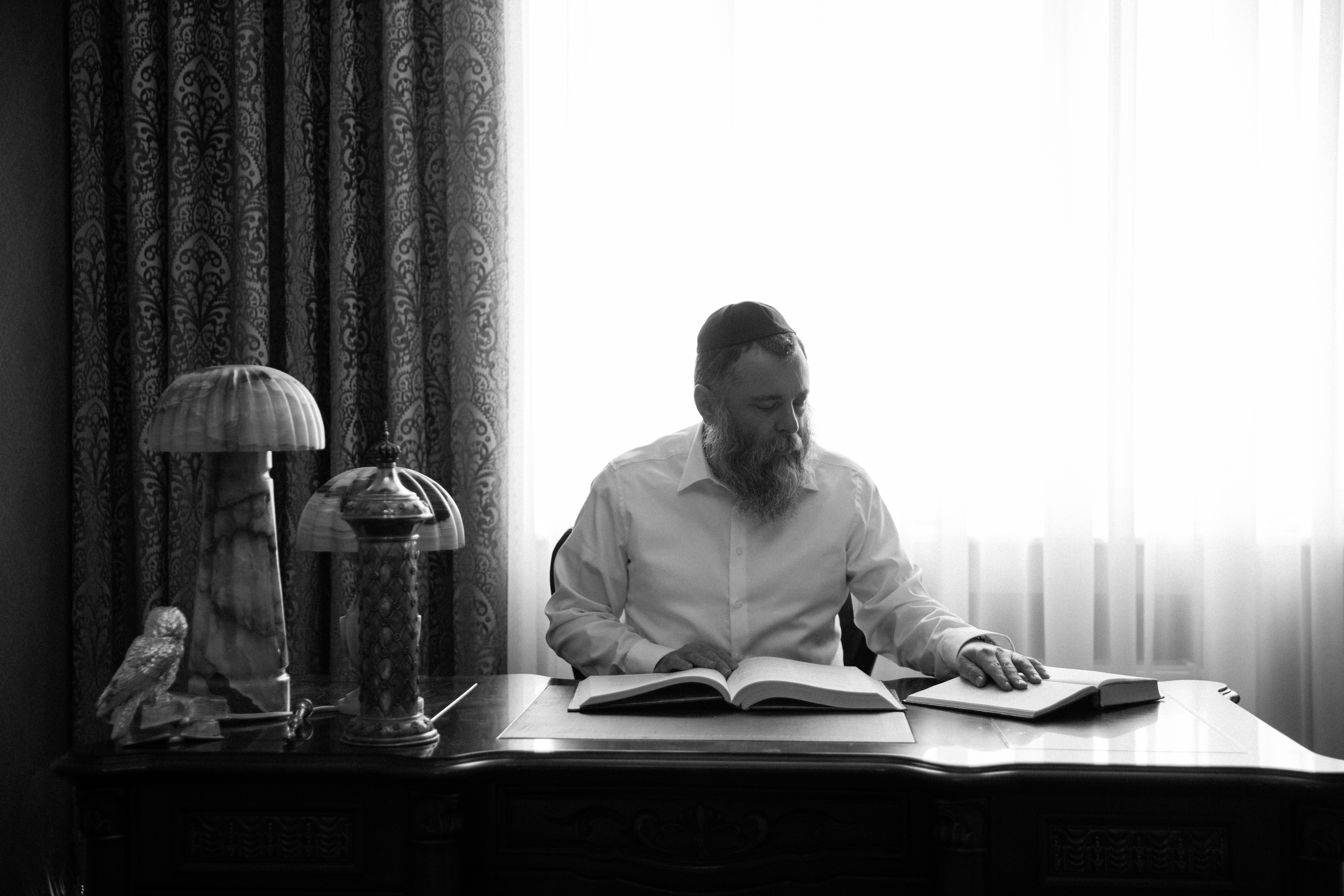
Markovitch in 2019

In 2000, Rabbi Markovitch and his family moved to Kyiv, the capital of Ukraine, where they established educational institutions and organized community events for the Jewish population.

After being appointed as the Chief Rabbi of Kyiv and the leading Chabad emissary, he and his wife developed local Jewish community institutions that includes a Chabad center, a kindergarten, and a private Jewish school (Perlina). They also established a specialized kindergarten for children with disabilities, open to both Jews and non-Jews, a kosher certification system, youth programs, an Israeli Chabad center, and a comprehensive humanitarian aid network. This network distributes food, clothing, and medicine to thousands of elderly and needy individuals throughout the year.

In early 2023, Rabbi Markovitch was officially appointed as the Rabbi of Ukraine's prison system.

During the COVID-19 pandemic in March 2020, he supported Ukraine’s lockdown measures and expressed his views on national television.

== Russia's war against Ukraine ==
During the war, Rabbi Markovitch has engaged in humanitarian activities for the Jewish community and Kyiv residents at large.

In the winter of 2023, amid power outages and heating shortages, he relocated hundreds of elderly residents from Kyiv to a temporary shelter in the Jewish community of Poland. He also engaged in informal diplomatic efforts in Western countries to secure continued support and supplies for Ukraine.

Following the outbreak of Israel’s Operation “Iron Swords,” Rabbi Markovitch assisted Ukrainian citizens caught in conflict zones, an effort acknowledged by Ukrainian President Volodymyr Zelenskyy in a public speech. He initiated the “Garden of Hope” project in Kyiv to raise awareness of Ukrainian prisoners of war and Israeli hostages in Gaza and Ukrainian prisoners of war. Additionally, the Kyiv Jewish community donated tablets to children with special needs in southern Israel.

== Honors and recognition ==
Rabbi Markovitch has received numerous accolades, including:

- Presidential Medal and Parliamentary Medal for significant contributions to Ukraine.

- Honorary recognition from the European Union.

- The Medal of Honor from the Ukrainian Bar Association in 2018.

- An award in 2024 from the Taras Shevchenko National University of Kyiv’s Military Institute.

== Initiatives and diplomatic activities ==
On International Holocaust Remembrance Day in 2021, Rabbi Markovitch, in collaboration with the United Nations, initiated a Holocaust Memorial Garden near the Babyn Yar National Monument.

In 2024, marking 30 years since the Lubavitcher Rebbe’s passing, Rabbi Markovitch and his son, Rabbi Ariel Markovitch, spearheaded the issuance of a commemorative postage stamp by the Ukrainian Postal Service.

At the onset of the Ukraine war, Rabbi Markovitch initiated the writing of a Torah scroll in honor of Ukraine’s Jewish community. Ukrainian President Volodymyr Zelenskyy participated by inscribing a letter in the Torah while in his presidential bunker. Following the October 7, 2023, massacre in Israel, the Torah scroll became a symbol uniting Ukrainian Jewry with the State of Israel.

Rabbi Markovitch collaborates with the Ukrainian government and international organizations in combating antisemitism in Ukraine.

== Family ==
Rabbi Markovitch is married to Rebbetzin Elke Ina Markovitch, who manages the “Or Avner” network of institutions in Kyiv, established with the assistance of Lev Leviev. The network includes kindergartens and schools, as well as a specialized program for children with autism.

The couple has seven children.

== Sources ==
- Chabad-Lubavitch (Kyiv)
- Official page on Chabad-Lubavitch (Kyiv) website
