= Preciado Bakish =

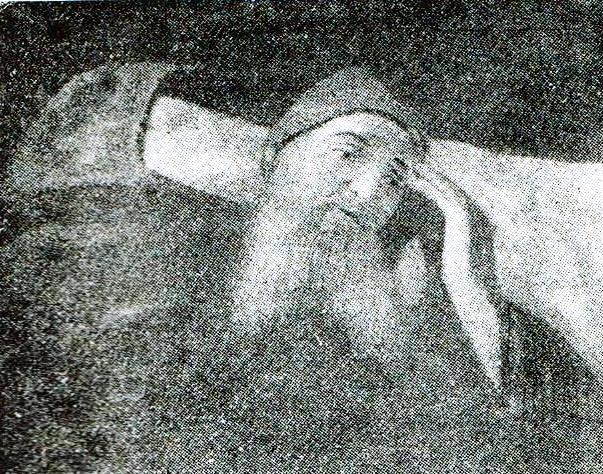
Preciado Bakish

Preciado Bakish (Hebrew: פרסיאדו בקיש ) (Note: Bulgarian: Пресиадо Бакиш. His surname is sometimes spelled Bakich or Baquiche (http://skachate.ru/jurnalistika/63296/index.html?page=12). The first name is sometimes written "Presiado". The first name Yakir (Hebrew: יקיר) is sometimes attributed to him. This name could match "expensive", "precious" which would mark a relationship with the Hebrew root Y.K.R. (yakar) and would be a translation of the Ladino name Preciado (or Presiado). See: http://www.sephardicstudies.org/pdf/prom_bulg_jews.pdf; Arditti, Benjamin (Ed. 1969), Volume I, pp. 20-32. Second first name : Yits'hak (http://skachate.ru/jurnalistika/63296/index.html?page=12).) was a Sephardic Jewish rabbi active in Bulgaria. He served as the Chief Rabbi of Bulgaria and was a prominent member of the Zionist Movement.

== Biographical elements ==
Born in 1828 at Sofia (Bulgaria) to a Sephardic Jewish family. He died in Jerusalem at the age of 82 (1910). He was named Chief Rabbi of Bulgaria (1885–1889; 1895–1898 or 1900) and Av Beit Din (Chairman of the Rabbinical Court) He participated in the First Zionist Congress held on 29, 30 and 31 August 1897 to Basel (Switzerland) along with three other delegates from Bulgaria (Zvi Belkovsky, Karl Herbst, Yehoshua Kalef) and some 200 other members from around the world. These activities have created difficulties and Rabbi Preciado Bakish was not maintained in his functions as Chief Rabbi of Bulgaria after 1900.

== Bibliography ==
- Anon (2002), 'List of the most famous Jews in Bulgaria during the period 1900-2000', SEGA (СЕГА) n° 5492 (2002), http://www.segabg.com/article.php?id=56802
- Benjamin Arditti (Ed. 1969), Vidni Evrei. Famous Jews of Bulgaria, Volume I, pp. 20–32, Tel Aviv
- Hillel Bakis (1992), 'Rabbi Ichaya Bakish. Un rabbin-juge marocain (16e-17e siècles)', pp. 1–40 (Préciado Bakich is quoted p. 4), in I. Bakish, Fragments, 132 p., Editions Bakish, Kiryat Ata
- Ivanka Gezenko (2014), ‘ЕВРЕЙСКАТА ОБЩНОСТ В БЪЛГАРИЯ 1879-1947 Г', p. 7, in Les Juifs en Bulgarie et dans les territoires sous administration bulgare pendant l’Holocauste. Colloque organisé dans le cadre du programme du Conseil de l’Europe « Transmission de la mémoire de l’Holocauste et prévention des crimes contre l’humanité », 26 mai, The Red House, Sofia. 39 p.
- Ivanka Gezenko (2015), ‘Political changes in Central Jewish Religious in Bulgaria (Sept. Dec. 1944)‘ pp. 205–211 (see p. 206), in Scientific Conference: "70 years since the coup of 1944 - Background and consequences. Collection of research, Central Military Club, Sofia. 8 sept. 2014. Manta print, Sofia. http://www.anamnesis.info/sites/default/files/SbornikDokladi.pdf
- Joseph J. Levy, Josué Elkouby & Marc Eliany (2001), Dictionnaire biographique du monde Juif sépharade et méditerranéen, Editions Elysée, Côte-St-Luc, Québec, 338 p. (p. 28).
- Mathilde Tagger & S. Alfassa Marks (2004 ?),’’Bulgaria Chief Rabbis’’, Fondation for the Advancement of Sephardic Studies and Culture, http://www.sephardicstudies.org/bulg-rab.html.
