= Mordecai Schornstein =

Rabbi Dr. Mordecai Schornstein מרדכי שורנשטיין
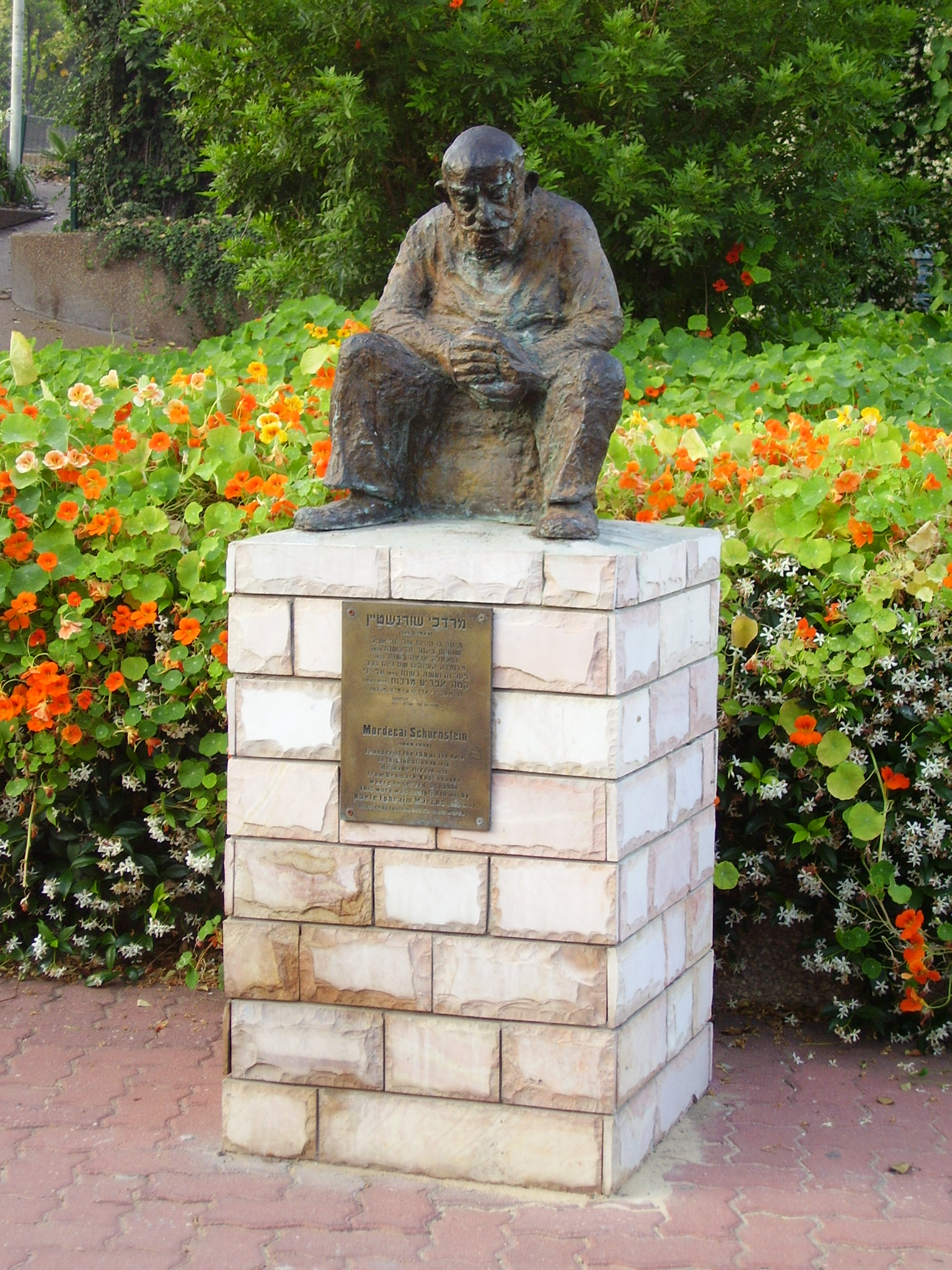
- Title: Chief Rabbi of Denmark

Personal life
- Born: 6 February 1869 Tachov, Bohemia, Austria-Hungary
- Died: 18 October 1949 (aged 80) Israel

Religious life
- Religion: Judaism
- Other: Founder of the Tel Aviv zoo

Rabbi Dr. Mordecai Schornstein (Hebrew: מרדכי שורנשטיין; 6 February 1869 – 18 October 1949) was the Chief Rabbi of Denmark, an animal lover and the founder of the Tel Aviv zoo.

== Biography ==
Schornstein was born in 1869 in Tachov, Bohemia. He served as Rabbi in Bílovec (Austrian Silesia) and in Litoměřice. In 1905 he was appointed Second Rabbi in Copenhagen, and in 1910 he got the position of Chief Rabbi of that community. Unlike his predecessor, Schornstein was easier on the conversion to Judaism of women who wished to marry Jewish men. Schornstein kept the Copenhagen position throughout World War I, till 1919, after which he was forced to quit the job due to disagreements with the community leaders who refused aid to the multiple Jewish immigrants that came to Denmark from Russia in those days. He moved to Dresden, and there, too, was active in attempts to bring the local Jews and the eastern Jews closer together.

=== Immigration to the Land of Israel ===
In 1935, Schornstein immigrated to the Land of Israel, and, at the age of 65, opened a pet shop named "Gan Hayot" ("zoo" in Hebrew) in Tel Aviv. A year later, in 1936, he was invited to the Levant Fair, where the exhibition of animals in cages he displayed was visited by some 15,000 people. After the fair, he reopened the zoo on HaYarkon Street, and added large birds to the collection.

Over the next years, several donations made the zoo a municipal attraction: a pair of lions from Egypt, plus a pair of leopards and a pair of Asian black bears from India. To better accommodate the larger number of animals, Schornstein submitted to the Tel Aviv municipality, with the aid of an "animal lovers society" and backed by a petition signed by 1139 residents of the city, a request to lease a land plot for building a larger zoo.

In June 1938 the municipality acceded to the request, and allocated a two and a half dunam — 2,500 square metres (27,000 sq ft) — on the Portalis grove site — nowadays next to the current location of the municipality building, but in that time, a hill so distant from the city, that he requested to be allowed to advertise the location of the zoo, for free, on municipal billboards and buses.

On 25 November 1938, Schornstein handed over ownership of all the animals owned by him to the Zoo Society, in exchange for their transfer to the new location, and provisioning for them. Schornstein himself was promised the position of the zoo director. The zoo was indeed opened as planned; however, following disagreements between Schornstein and the Society, he demanded to nullify the agreement. At the end of 1939, the dispute was passed to arbitration, and the Society ceased paying Schornstein's salary. For a while, Schornstein earned a living by selling pets, but in August 1940 the Tel Aviv municipality forbade him from continuing that activity, leaving him with no source of income. On 27 August 1940, Schornstein marched into the zoo offices and took three Palestine pounds from the desk, right in front of the accountant, claiming that it was on account for his held back wages. The accountant reported this to the Society manager, and a complaint was filed against him with the police. Schornstein was charged with theft on 25 September 1940, and judge Shneor Cheshin ruled that he should have received the money from the Society, but should not have taken the money in the way he did. Schorenstein was convicted and charged with bail of five pounds for half a year to guarantee that he would not repeat the offense. In November 1940 the arbitrators published their decision, in which the majority ruled that Schornstein had breached the agreement, and thus the animals shall remain under ownership of the Society, who would pay Schornstein 300 pounds and his salary as zoo director until November 1940.

In June 1941 the legal dispute came to a conclusion with an agreement signed in the Tel Aviv District Court: Schornstein committed not to sell animals or birds from the zoo, and in exchange was provided with a monthly retainer, and he and his family were granted lifetime free entrance to the zoo. In addition, the Society committed to commemorate Schornstein on a plaque at the zoo gate, if he fulfilled his commitment.

=== Last days ===
Schornstein moved to Beit HaKerem, Jerusalem and founded the "Bird Garden". In 1947 he moved to Netanya, where the local municipality gave him a plot of half a dunam — 500 square metres (5,400 sq ft) — for a petting zoo.

In 1949 Schornstein fell ill and moved to live with his son at one of the moshavot in the Sharon. He died at the end of October 1949, at the age of 80.

The Tel Aviv Zoo was closed in 1980, its animals were moved to the Ramat Gan Safari, and the Gan Ha'ir shopping mall and residential tower were built on its site. A bronze sculpture of Schornstein, created in 1945 by the artist Käthe Ephraim-Marcus, was placed on the Gan Ha'ir site, as a donation by her children Ephraim and Carmela Marcus.

Schornstein's daughter, Meta, married Marcus Melchior, who was later also appointed to Chief Rabbi of Copenhagen, and then also to Chief Rabbi of the whole Jewish community of Denmark, as was his son, Bent Melchior. Bent's son, the great-grandson of Schornstein, is Michael Melchior, former Minister of Social and Diaspora Affairs, a former Deputy Minister of Foreign Affairs, and a former member of the Knesset for Meimad.

Family of Mordecai 'Max' Schornstein

Levin Moses Wallach; Rabbi in Faaborg
Mordecai Schornstein; Chief Rabbi of Denmark	Arnold Melchior	Bertha Wallach
Meta Schornstein	Marcus Melchior; Chief Rabbi of Denmark
Werner David Melchior	Arne Melchior	Bent Melchior; Chief Rabbi of Denmark	Hilde Melchior
Michael Melchior; Chief Rabbi of Norway	Uri Schwarz; Chief Rabbi of Finland
Jair Melchior; Chief Rabbi of Denmark
