= Demographics of Denmark =

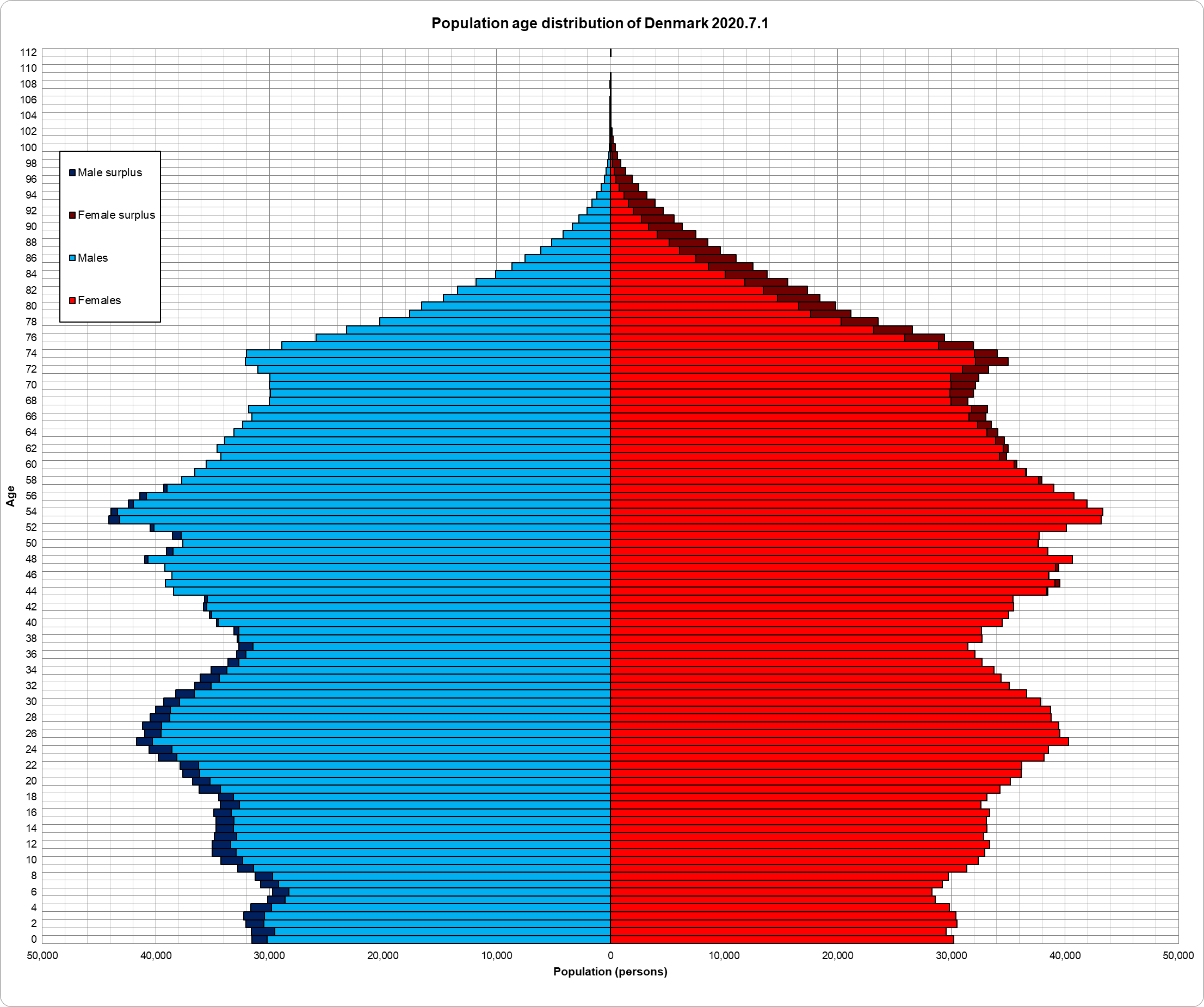
- Population pyramid of Denmark in 2020
- Population: 6,032,963 (1 May 2026 est.)
- Growth rate: 1.0085% (2022 est.)
- Birth rate: 9.85 births/1,000 population
- Death rate: 10.02 deaths/1,000 population
- Life expectancy: 81.66 years
  - male: 79.74 years
  - female: 83.71 years
- Fertility rate: 1.506 children born/woman (2025)
- Infant mortality: 3.04 deaths/1,000 live births
- Net migration rate: 2.73 migrant(s)/1,000 population (2022 est.)
- Immigrant share: 14.2% (2024)

Age structure
- 0–14 years: 16.42%
- 65 and over: 19.91%

Sex ratio
- Total: 0.99 male(s)/female (2022 est.)
- At birth: 1.07 male(s)/female
- 65 and over: 0.7 male(s)/female

Nationality
- Nationality: Danish, Dane
- Major ethnic: Dane (83.6%)
- Minor ethnic: Other European ethnic groups (over 10%); Other non-European ethnic groups (less than 5%)

Language
- Official: Danish, Faroese and Greenlandic
- Spoken: Languages of Denmark

Demographic features of the population of Denmark proper, part of the Danish Realm, include ethnicity, education level, health of the populace, economic status, religious affiliations, and other aspects.

== Population ==
View source data.
View source data.
View source data.

Since 1980, which marked a decrease in population, the number of people of Danish descent, defined as having at least one parent who was born in Denmark and has Danish citizenship, has remained constant at around 5 million in Denmark, and nearly all the population growth from 5.1 and thereafter was mostly due to immigration. During April of 2025, the number of inhabitants in Denmark reached 6 million.

Population numbers in 2100 are expected to be slightly lower than in 2024.

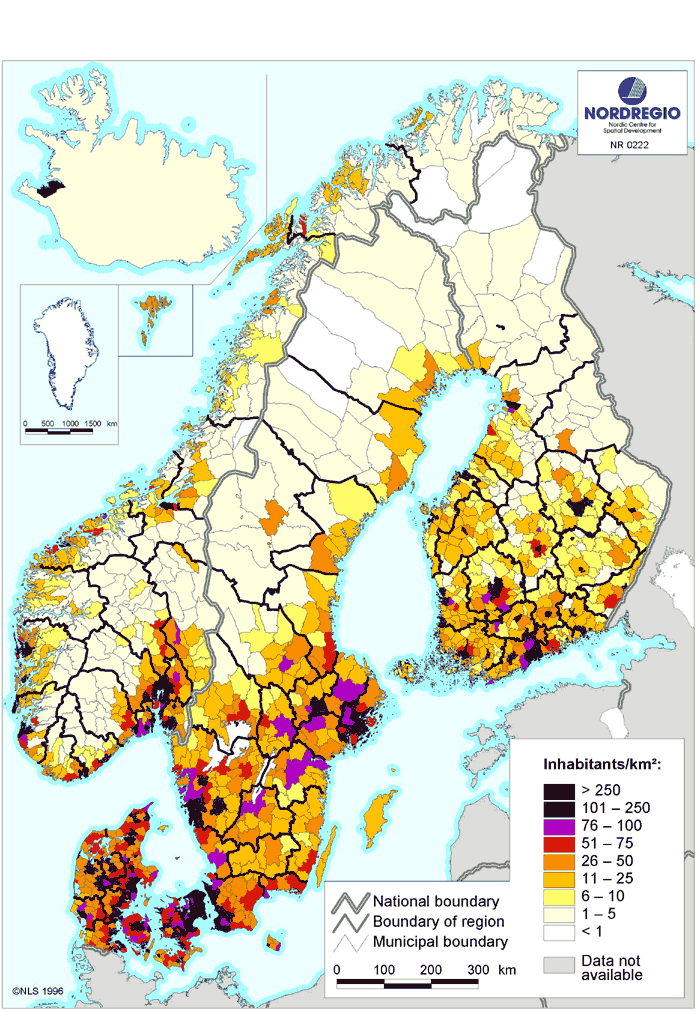
The population density is higher in Denmark than in the other Nordic countries.

Population of Denmark, 0–2021

Historical population
Year	Pop.	±% p.a.
1870	1,784,741	—
1880	1,969,039	+0.99%
1890	2,172,380	+0.99%
1901	2,449,540	+1.10%
1911	2,747,076	+1.15%
1921	3,267,831	+1.75%
1930	3,550,656	+0.93%
1940	3,844,312	+0.80%
1950	4,281,275	+1.08%
1960	4,585,256	+0.69%
1970	4,937,579	+0.74%
1980	5,122,065	+0.37%
1990	5,135,409	+0.03%
2000	5,330,020	+0.37%
2010	5,534,738	+0.38%
2020	5,822,763	+0.51%
2026	6,025,603	+0.57%
Source: Statistics Denmark; 2020 estimate

Year	Population
1769	797,584
1787	841,806
1801	929,001
1834	1,230,964
1840	1,289,075
1845	1,356,877
1850	1,414,648
1855	1,507,222
1860	1,608,362
1870	1,784,741
1880	1,969,039
1890	2,172,380
1901	2,449,540
1906	2,588,919
1911	2,757,076
1916	2,921,362
1921	3,267,831
1925	3,434,555
1930	3,550,656
1935	3,706,349
1940	3,844,312
1945	4,045,232
1950	4,281,275
1955	4,448,401
1960	4,585,256
1965	4,767,597
1970	4,937,579
1971	4,950,598
1972	4,975,653
1973	5,007,538
1974	5,036,184
1975	5,054,410

=== Fertility ===
The natural growth of the population (births minus deaths) was negative in 2022, that is, minus 1005 people. The previous last year there was a negative natural increase in the population was in 1988. During 2022, 58,430 children were born, 5,043 fewer than in 2021. In 2022, 59,435 people died, there were 2,283, or 4.0% more than in 2021. The total population in the age group 80 and over grew by 12,844 people, or 4.4%., from 2022 to 2023.

During 2022, the Danish population grew by 59,234 people, so the population on January 1, 2023, consisted of 5,932,654 people. It was a population increase of 1.0 percent, which is higher than in 2021, when the population increase was 0.6 percent.

In 2022, Denmark had a total fertility rate (TFR) of 1.55 children per woman in 2022. It is the first time in history that immigrant women from non-Western countries now have fewer children on average than women of Danish roots in Denmark. On average, immigrant women have 1.76 children, the descendants have an average of 1.75 children, while women of Danish roots have 1.78 children. This is because Ukrainians, who are categorized as non-Western, have come to Denmark in large numbers. In the same year, immigrant women from Syria had the highest TFR, they gave birth to an average of 3.7 children. They are followed by women from Somalia and Pakistan, 2020 figures show.

In 2021 the number of childless women aged 50 was the highest in seven years; 12.3 percent of women aged 50 have never had a child, while 19.5 percent of 50-year-old men do not have children.

=== Historical fertility rates ===
TFR of Denmark over time to 2016

The total fertility rate is the number of children born per woman. It is based on fairly good data for the entire period. Sources: Our World In Data and Gapminder Foundation.

Year	1850	1851	1852	1853	1854	1855	1856	1857	1858	1859	1860
Total fertility rate in Denmark	4.24	4.06	4.48	4.27	4.41	4.31	4.37	4.44	4.48	4.53	4.4

Year	1861	1862	1863	1864	1865	1866	1867	1868	1869	1870
Total fertility rate in Denmark	4.27	4.17	4.17	4.06	4.21	4.32	4.09	4.18	3.96	4.1

Year	1871	1872	1873	1874	1875	1876	1877	1878	1879	1880
Total fertility rate in Denmark	4.06	4.09	4.16	4.17	4.31	4.4	4.36	4.27	4.3	4.28

Year	1881	1882	1883	1884	1885	1886	1887	1888	1889	1890
Total fertility rate in Denmark	4.34	4.36	4.29	4.5	4.39	4.37	4.28	4.25	4.21	4.11

Year	1891	1892	1893	1894	1895	1896	1897	1898	1899
Total fertility rate in Denmark	4.18	4	4.16	4.1	4.09	4.11	4.02	4.08	4.01

Total fertility rate

1.78 children born/woman (2018 est.) Country comparison to the world: 152nd

=== Average age of the mother at her first birth ===
In 2021 the average age of the mother at her first birth in Denmark was of 29.8 years, and the father is of 31.5 years.

=== Life expectancy ===
Sources: Our World In Data and the United Nations.

1775–1950

Years	1775	1835	1836	1837	1838	1839	1840	1841	1842	1843	1844	1845	1846	1847	1848	1849	1850
Life expectancy in Denmark	33.0	38.4	40.0	41.5	43.1	41.9	41.1	42.6	42.5	43.9	44.0	43.4	40.4	40.4	40.8	39.5	43.5

Life expectancy in Denmark since 1775

Years	1851	1852	1853	1854	1855	1856	1857	1858	1859	1860
Life expectancy in Denmark	44.5	43.0	38.5	44.7	46.1	46.7	42.5	40.0	44.4	45.1

Years	1861	1862	1863	1864	1865	1866	1867	1868	1869	1870
Life expectancy in Denmark	47.6	47.6	47.2	40.2	39.8	42.9	44.9	45.6	46.1	46.0

Years	1871	1872	1873	1874	1875	1876	1877	1878	1879	1880
Life expectancy in Denmark	46.1	47.2	47.5	46.0	44.4	45.8	47.3	47.5	46.2	44.8

Years	1881	1882	1883	1884	1885	1886	1887	1888	1889	1890
Life expectancy in Denmark	48.3	46.7	48.5	48.5	49.6	49.0	48.7	46.7	47.8	47.2

Years	1891	1892	1893	1894	1895	1896	1897	1898	1899	1900
Life expectancy in Denmark	46.8	47.4	47.1	49.4	50.8	52.9	51.8	53.1	50.6	51.9

Years	1901	1902	1903	1904	1905	1906	1907	1908	1909	1910
Life expectancy in Denmark	52.6	54.7	54.8	55.7	54.3	56.5	56.1	54.9	57.4	58.0

Years	1911	1912	1913	1914	1915	1916	1917	1918	1919	1920
Life expectancy in Denmark	57.0	58.0	58.9	58.5	58.4	56.9	57.3	56.3	57.0	57.6

Years	1921	1922	1923	1924	1925	1926	1927	1928	1929	1930
Life expectancy in Denmark	61.7	60.6	61.2	61.1	61.9	61.7	61.2	61.9	61.9	62.3

Years	1931	1932	1933	1934	1935	1936	1937	1938	1939	1940
Life expectancy in Denmark	61.8	62.7	63.6	64.1	62.9	63.5	64.0	65.0	65.8	66.3

Years	1941	1942	1943	1944	1945	1946	1947	1948	1949	1950
Life expectancy in Denmark	66.0	67.1	67.4	66.4	66.1	67.2	68.5	70.1	70.1	70.3

1950–2015

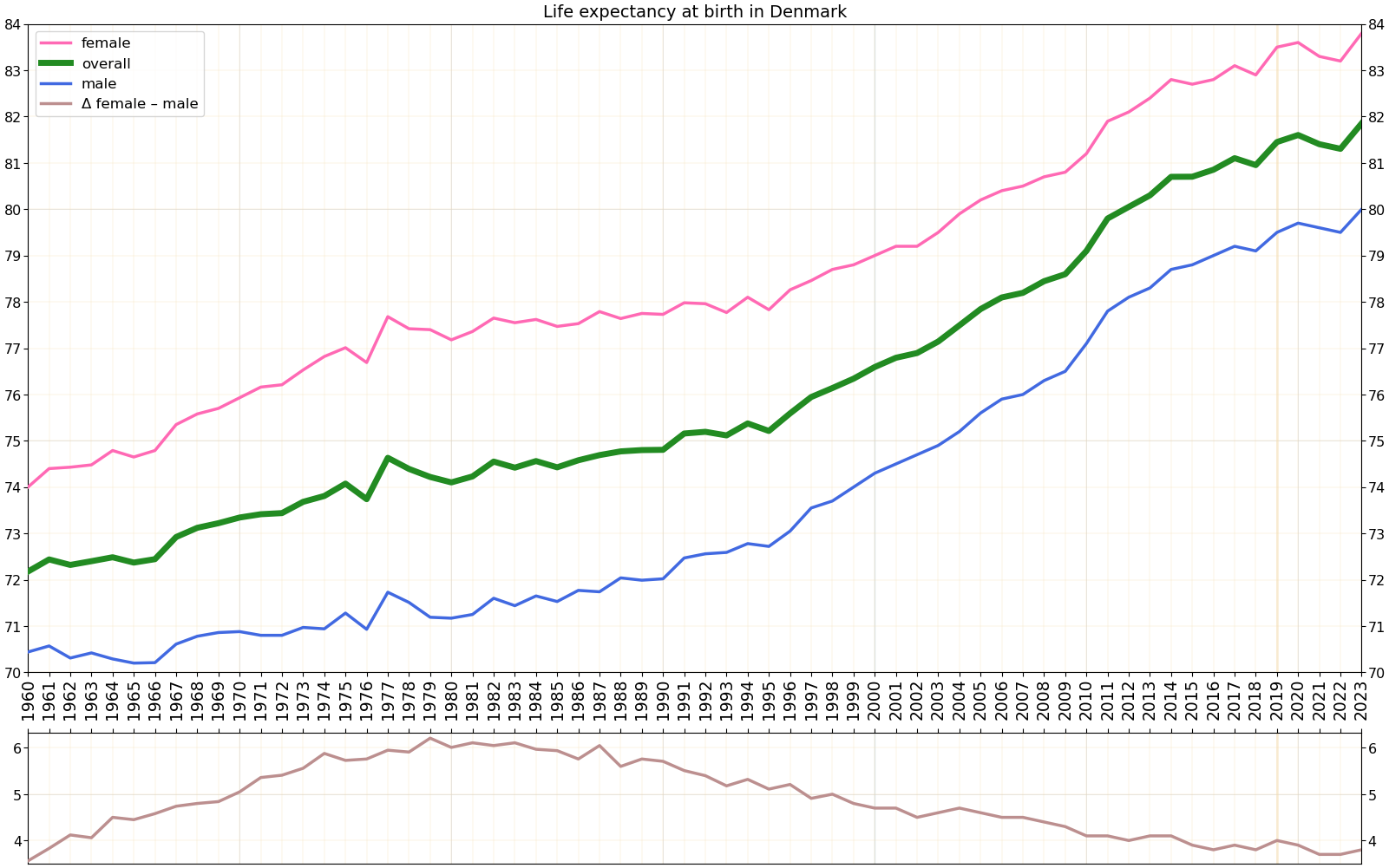
Life expectancy in Denmark since 1960 by gender

Period	Life expectancy in Years	Period	Life expectancy in Years
1950–1955	71.1	1985–1990	74.8
1955–1960	72.1	1990–1995	75.2
1960–1965	72.4	1995–2000	76.1
1965–1970	72.9	2000–2005	77.3
1970–1975	73.6	2005–2010	78.6
1975–1980	74.2	2010–2015	80.2
1980–1985	74.4		

Population pyramid from 1950 to 2020

=== Age structure ===
0–14 years: 16.57% (male 493,829 /female 468,548)
15–24 years: 12.67% (male 377,094 /female 358,807)
25–54 years: 39.03% (male 1,147,196 /female 1,119,967)
55–64 years: 12.33% (male 356,860 /female 359,264)
65 years and over: 19.42% (male 518,200 /female 609,737) (2018 est.)

Median age
total: 41.9 years. Country comparison to the world: 35th
male: 40.8 years
female: 42.9 years (2018 est.)

== Ethnic and origin groups ==
People of Danish descent as a proportion of the population regionally and nationally in 2021

Population pyramid of Denmark over time by origin

Non-indigenous ethnic minorities include:

- Afghans
- Greenlandic
- Turks
- Arabs (i.e. Palestinians, followed by Moroccans, Syrians, Lebanese, Yemenis, Egyptians, Iraqis and Jordanians)
- Vietnamese
- Thai
- Jews
- Chinese
- Pakistanis
- Iranians (including Kurds and Lurs)
- Somalis
- Eritreans
- Sudanese
- Indians
- Chileans (the most numerous of Latin American nationalities)
- Bosniaks
- Poles
- Albanians
- Bangladeshis
- Roma
- Filipinos

=== Historic minorities ===
Ethnic minorities in Denmark include a handful of groups:

- Approximately 15,000 people in Denmark belong to a German minority traditionally referred to as tysksindet meaning "German-minded" in Danish, and as Nordschleswiger in German. This minority of Germans hold Danish citizenship and self-identify as Germans. Many of them speak German or Low German as their home language. There are also several thousand German citizens and other ethnic Germans residing in Denmark with no historical connection to this group. From 1864 until 15 June 1920 this group mainly lived in what would become Germany in 1871. This area had 163,600 inhabitants on its return to Denmark which can be seen on the crude migration change in the table which jumped from 1.6 in 1919 to 54.1 in 1920.
- An estimated 23,000 people in Denmark proper are ethnic Faroese, while 19,000 Greenlanders reside permanently in Denmark. Many of these use the Faroese and Greenlandic languages, respectively, as their first language. All residents of the Kingdom (viz. Denmark proper, the Faroe Islands and Greenland) hold Danish citizenship, unless they inherit or otherwise receive a foreign citizenship.
- The Danish Jews number around 6,000 in 2020 according to the organisation Jewish Community in Denmark, around 1,700 being card-carrying members of the organisation.
- There are close to 10,000 Roma in Denmark.

=== Modern minorities ===
A person has Danish origin if he or she has at least one parent who is both a Danish citizen and born in Denmark. Neither immigrants nor descendants have one parent who is both a Danish citizen and born in Denmark. The difference between immigrants and descendants is that immigrants were born abroad, while descendants were born in Denmark.

For asylum seekers and other persons applying for a residence permit in Denmark, there is no unambiguous connection between the time of a granted residence permit and immigration for the person who has been granted the residence permit. The number of residence permits granted in a quarter cannot be interpreted as the quarter's immigration. Citizens of Finland, Iceland, Norway and Sweden do not need a residence permit to live, work or study in Denmark.

— Statistics Denmark

Population pyramid of Denmark by origin group in 2023

Danish and foreign born population pyramid in 2023

In the modern minorities, Statistics Denmark counts first-generation immigrants, second-generation (Descendants in Danish statistics classification) and third-generation (Children of descendants in Danish classification). Children of descendants can be either of "Danish origin" (if both of their parents were born in Denmark with Danish citizenship) and of "foreign origin" (if one of their parents is a second-generation immigrant and another first-generation). Therefore, this table included all people of the respective background, people who are classified as of "foreign background" and third-generation immigrants, who classified as of "Danish origin". Statistics Denmark denotes an immigrant's group based on their country of birth, it does this usually off of the immigrant or descendents parents, if only one such parent is known, then the group is determined by that or if no parents are known then it is assumed if the person is an immigrant that their country of origin is their country of birth.

Statistics Denmark also has specific classification bands which it uses to separate different immigrant groups. As an example, for 'Western' immigrants and 'Non-western', the classification band is as follows:

- Western countries: All 28 EU countries and Andorra, Iceland, Liechtenstein, Monaco, Norway, San Marino, Switzerland, Vatican State, Canada, United States, Australia and New Zealand.
- Non-western countries; All other countries.

According to 2026 figures from Statistics Denmark, 83,2% of Denmark's population of over 6,025,603 was of Danish descent. The remaining 16,8% were of a foreign background, defined as immigrants or descendants of recent immigrants. With the same definition, the most common countries of origin were Turkey, Poland, Germany, Iraq, Romania, Syria, Somalia, Iran, Afghanistan, and Yugoslavia and its successor states. More than 1,011,036 individuals (16,8%) are migrants and their descendants (230,082 second generation migrants born in Denmark).

Of these 1,011,036 immigrants and their descendants:

- 357,803 (35.4%) have a Western background (Norway, Germany, Bosnia and Herzegovina, UK, Poland, Romania and Iceland; definition: EU countries, non-EU Nordic countries, Andorra, Liechtenstein, Monaco, San Marino, Switzerland, Vatican State, Canada, USA, Australia and New Zealand).
- 653,233 (64.6%) have a non-Western background (Turkey, Iraq, Iran, Pakistan, Thailand, Ukraine, and Somalia; all other countries).

There were 121,183 immigrants in 2022, of these 31,381 were Ukrainian citizens, people with Ukrainian citizenship accounted for 26 percent of all immigration. The total population of Denmark increased in 2022 by 59,234 people, and the net immigration of Ukrainian people amounted to 45 percent of this population growth.

Rank	Country of origin	Population (2008)	Population (2021)	Population (2023)	Population (2024)	Population (2025)
1.	Turkey	59,960	75,072	77,845	79,373	80,937
2.	(European Union) Poland	21,118	49,369	55,122	57,070	57,215
3.	Ukraine	5,105	15,595	42,482	44,825	49,854
4.	Syria	3,367	44,326	45,000	45,641	46,634
5.	(European Union) Romania	3,681	34,997	44,221	46,036	46,132
6.	(European Union) Germany	28,412	35,141	39,528	41,516	43,410
7.	Iraq	28,417	34,217	35,101	35,476	35,975
8.	Pakistan	21,217	31,175	32,246	33,050	34,181
9.	Lebanon	23,343	30,435	31,700	32,269	33,014
10.	Iran	14,773	22,408	24,364	26,276	28,491
11.	Bosnia and Herzegovina	21,861	23,449	23,625	23,659	23,732
12.	India	5,666	15,595	19,296	21,268	22,815
13.	Afghanistan	11,880	19,957	21,380	21,784	22,172
14.	Somalia	16,561	21,338	21,486	21,653	21,849
15.	United Kingdom	12,593	17,651	18,190	18,442	18,605
16.	(European Union) Sweden	14,789	17,095	17,726	17,999	18,303
17.	Vietnam	13,459	16,307	16,906	17,448	18,272
18.	Norway	15,747	17,481	17,691	17,735	17,786
19.	China	8,574	14,841	15,836	16,549	17,443
20.	(European Union) Lithuania	3,646	15,231	16,439	16,357	16,192
21.	former Yugoslavia (Note: Former Yugoslavia enumerates otherwise unspecified countries that made-up SFR Yugoslavia, i.e. the countries of Bosnia and Herzegovina, Croatia, Kosovo, Montenegro, North Macedonia, Serbia and Slovenia.)	18,151	15,903	15,356	15,016	14,257
22.	Morocco	9,808	13,170	13,708	13,937	14,138
23.	Thailand	8,280	13,166	13,693	14,029	14,122
24.	(European Union) Bulgaria	1,194	-	13,503	13,840	14,007
25.	Sri Lanka	10,494	–	12,692	12,996	13,734
26.	Philippines	7,199	–	12,760	13,098	13,577
27.	(European Union) Italy	3,994	–	11,684	12,313	13,135
28.	USA	7,151	–	10,786	11,293	11,797
29.	Russia	4,389	–	9,517	9,946	10,323
30.	Iceland	8,421	–	9,513	9,765	10,082

Population groups	Year											
Population groups	1981		1991		2001		2011		2021		2026	
Population groups	Number	%	Number	%	Number	%	Number	%	Number	%	Number	%
(Denmark) Danish descent	4,968,337	96.96%	4,920,267	95.6%	4,953,265	92.59%	4,998,111	89.88%	5,022,607	86%	5,014,567	83.22%
Immigrants	136,229	2.65%	189,649	3.68%	308,674	5.77%	428,904	7.71%	617,770	10.58%	780,954	12.96%
(European Union) EU-27	59,808	1.16%	61,279	1.19%	74,565	1.39%	124,092	2.23%	205,731	3.52%	253,968	4.21%
Europe outside EU-27	45,148	0.88%	55,797	1.08%	98,042	1.83%	116,300	2.09%	131,189	2.24%	182,180	3.02%
Africa	5,033	–	9,710	0.18%	28,190	0.52%	33,135	0.59%	46,376	0.79%	53,294	0.88%
North America	6,312	–	6,525	–	7,008	–	9,068	0.16%	10,890	0.18%	14,054	0.23%
South and Central America	2,987	–	4,263	–	6,248	–	9,826	0.17%	17,430	0.29%	25,263	0.42%
Asia	16,200	0.31%	50,556	0.98%	91,731	1.71%	133,261	2.39%	202,625	3.46%	248,155	4.12%
Oceania	571	–	811	–	1,314	–	2,277	–	2,905	–	3,633	
Stateless	9	–	373	–	367	–	480	–	352	–	222	
Unknown	170	–	335	–	1,209	–	465	–	272	–	185	
Descendants	19,423	0.37%	36,553	0.71%	87,273	1.63%	133,613	2.40%	199,668	3.42%	230,082	3.82%
(European Union) EU-27	6,763	0.13%	6,949	0.13%	9,679	0.18%	13,097	0.23%	28,273	0.48%	36,557	0.61%
Europe outside EU-27	6,831	0.13%	15,302	0.29%	32,237	0.60%	46,291	0.83%	59,309	1.01%	65,264	1.08%
Africa	895	–	2,414	–	10,258	0.19%	16,608	0.29%	25,188	0.43%	28,587	0.47%
North America	985	–	926	–	1,004	–	929	–	1,029	–	1,234	
South and Central America	275	–	363	–	605	–	902	–	1,571	–	2,254	
Asia	3,535	–	10,420	0.20%	33,045	0.61%	55,260	0.99%	83,815	1.43%	95,782	1.59%
Oceania	93	–	88	–	129	–	149	–	196	–	212	
Stateless	29	–	56	–	109	–	237	–	154	–	92	
Unknown	17	–	35	–	207	–	140	–	133	–	200	
Total	5,123,989	100%	5,146,469	100%	5,349,212	100%	5,560,628	100%	5,840,045	100%	6,025,603	100%

Population pyramids of selected origin groups in 2023

Persons of Danish origin

Western immigrant

Non-Western immigrant

Western descendant

Non-Western descendant

== Vital statistics ==
Births and deaths in Denmark over time

Live births and deaths over time

Crude birth rate and death rate over time

Data according to Statistics Denmark, which collects the official statistics for Denmark.

	Average population (Jan 1)	Live births	Deaths	Natural change	Crude birth rate (per 1000)	Crude death rate (per 1000)	Nat. change (per 1000)	Crude migration change (per 1000)	Total fertility rate (Note: In developed countries, fertility rates 2.1 and above is a stable population and have been marked blue, 2 and below leads to an aging population and a reducing population.)	Tempo adjusted fertility rate
1800	930,000	32,800	29,900	2,900	35.3	32.1	3.2	5.4		
1801	938,000	33,000	30,000	3,000	35.2	32.0	3.2	5.3		
1802	946,000	33,300	30,100	3,200	35.2	31.8	3.4	5.1		
1803	954,000	33,600	30,300	3,300	35.2	31.8	3.5	4.9		
1804	962,000	33,900	30,500	3,400	35.2	31.7	3.5	5.9		
1805	971,000	34,100	30,700	3,400	35.1	31.6	3.5	5.8		
1806	980,000	34,300	30,900	3,400	35.0	31.5	3.5	4.7		
1807	988,000	34,400	31,500	2,900	34.8	31.9	2.9	4.2		
1808	995,000	34,500	32,000	2,500	34.7	32.2	2.5	4.5		
1809	1,002,000	34,600	32,300	2,300	34.5	32.2	2.3	4.7		
1810	1,009,000	34,700	32,600	2,100	34.4	32.3	2.1	4.8		
1811	1,016,000	34,800	32,700	2,100	34.3	32.2	2.1	5.8		
1812	1,024,000	34,900	32,900	2,000	34.1	32.1	2.0	4.8		
1813	1,031,000	35,000	33,200	1,800	33.9	32.2	1.7	4.1		
1814	1,037,000	35,200	33,000	2,200	33.9	31.8	2.1	4.7		
1815	1,044,000	35,500	32,700	2,800	34.0	31.3	2.7	5		
1816	1,052,000	35,800	32,500	3,300	34.0	30.9	3.1	5.5		
1817	1,061,000	36,100	32,400	3,700	34.0	30.5	3.5	4		
1818	1,069,000	36,300	32,300	4,000	33.9	30.2	3.7	4.7		
1819	1,078,000	36,400	32,400	4,000	33.8	30.1	3.7	13		
1820	1,096,000	36,400	30,700	5,700	33.2	28.0	5.2	3		
1821	1,105,000	36,700	30,900	5,800	33.2	28.0	5.2	2.9		
1822	1,114,000	37,000	31,100	5,900	33.2	27.9	5.3	3.7		
1823	1,124,000	37,300	31,300	6,000	33.2	27.8	5.3	3.6		
1824	1,134,000	37,600	31,500	6,100	33.2	27.8	5.4	3.4		
1825	1,144,000	37,900	31,800	6,100	33.1	27.8	5.3	3.4		
1826	1,154,000	38,200	32,000	6,200	33.1	27.7	5.4	3.3		
1827	1,164,000	38,500	32,300	6,200	33.1	27.8	5.3	3.3		
1828	1,174,000	38,800	32,500	6,300	33.0	27.7	5.4	3.1		
1829	1,184,000	39,200	32,700	6,500	33.1	27.6	5.5	3.8		
1830	1,195,000	39,500	32,900	6,600	33.0	27.5	5.5	−5.5		
1831	1,195,000	39,383	32,698	6,685	32.9	27.4	5.6	0		
1832	1,201,685	39,551	32,715	6,836	32.9	27.2	5.7	0		
1833	1,208,521	39,724	32,735	6,989	32.8	27.1	5.8	0		
1834	1,215,510	39,900	32,757	7,143	32.8	27.0	5.9	0		
1835	1,222,653	40,082	32,781	7,301	32.8	26.8	6.0	0		
1836	1,229,954	40,900	32,757	8,143	33.3	26.6	6.6	0		
1837	1,238,097	41,300	32,800	8,500	33.4	26.5	6.9	0		
1838	1,246,597	41,900	32,900	8,999	33.6	26.4	7.2	0		
1839	1,255,596	42,400	33,000	9,400	33.8	26.3	7.5	35.8		
1840	1,310,000	55,000	41,200	13,800	42.0	31.5	10.5	2.5		
1841	1,327,000	55,300	41,000	14,300	41.7	30.9	10.8	2		
1842	1,344,000	55,600	40,800	14,800	41.4	30.4	11.0	1.6		
1843	1,361,000	55,900	40,600	15,300	41.1	29.8	11.2	1.3		
1844	1,378,000	56,200	40,400	15,800	40.8	29.3	11.5	0.8		
1845	1,395,000	56,500	40,200	16,300	40.5	28.8	11.7	0.5		
1846	1,412,000	56,800	39,900	16,900	40.2	28.3	11.9	0.1		
1847	1,429,000	57,000	39,700	17,300	39.9	27.8	12.1	−0,2		
1848	1,446,000	57,300	39,500	17,800	39.6	27.3	12.3	−0.5		
1849	1,463,000	57,600	39,300	18,300	39.4	26.9	12.5	−0.9		
1850	1,480,000	58,000	39,100	18,900	39.2	26.4	12.8	−0.6		
1851	1,498,000	58,300	38,900	19,400	38.9	26.0	12.9	−0.9		
1852	1,516,000	58,600	38,700	19,900	38.7	25.5	13.1	−1.2		
1853	1,534,000	58,900	38,500	20,400	38.4	25.1	13.3	−1.6		
1854	1,552,000	59,200	38,300	20,900	38.1	24.7	13.5	−1.9		
1855	1,570,000	59,600	38,100	21,500	38.0	24.3	13.7	−2.2		
1856	1,588,000	60,000	37,900	22,100	37.8	23.9	13.9	−1.9		
1857	1,607,000	60,400	37,700	22,700	37.6	23.5	14.1	−2.3		
1858	1,626,000	60,900	37,500	23,400	37.5	23.1	14.4	−58.1		
1859	1,555,000	64,900	45,800	19,100	41.7	29.5	12.3	3.8		
1860	1,580,000	65,200	45,400	19,800	41.3	28.8	12.5	2.7		
1861	1,604,000	65,500	45,000	20,500	40.8	28.1	12.8	2.2		
1862	1,628,000	65,700	44,700	21,000	40.3	27.5	12.9	2.5		
1863	1,653,000	66,000	44,500	21,500	39.9	26.9	13.0	2.1		
1864	1,678,000	66,300	44,300	22,000	39.5	26.4	13.1	1.8		
1865	1,703,000	66,500	44,100	22,400	39.1	25.9	13.2	1.5		
1866	1,728,000	66,800	43,800	23,000	38.7	25.3	13.3	1.2		
1867	1,753,000	67,000	43,500	23,500	38.2	24.8	13.4	1.4		
1868	1,779,000	67,200	43,300	23,900	37.8	24.3	13.4	0.7		
1869	1,804,000	67,300	43,100	24,200	37.3	23.9	13.4	0.5		
1870	1,829,000	67,400	42,900	24,500	36.8	23.5	13.4	−0.3		
1871	1,853,000	67,500	42,600	24,900	36.4	23.0	13.4	−0.4		
1872	1,877,000	67,600	42,300	25,300	36.0	22.5	13.5	−0.7		
1873	1,901,000	67,700	42,100	25,600	35.6	22.1	13.5	−0.9		
1874	1,925,000	67,900	41,900	26,000	35.3	21.8	13.5	−1		
1875	1,949,000	68,100	41,700	26,400	35.0	21.4	13.6	−1.3		
1876	1,973,000	68,300	41,500	26,800	34.6	21.0	13.6	−1.4		
1877	1,997,000	68,500	41,300	27,200	34.3	20.7	13.6	−1.6		
1878	2,021,000	68,700	41,200	27,500	34.0	20.4	13.6	−2.2		
1879	2,044,000	68,900	41,000	27,900	33.7	20.1	13.6	90.9		
1880	1,886,000	67,100	47,900	19,200	35.6	25.4	10.2	5.2		
1881	1,915,000	67,200	47,400	19,800	35.1	24.8	10.3	4.8		
1882	1,944,000	67,300	47,000	20,300	34.6	24.2	10.4	4.5		
1883	1,973,000	67,500	46,600	20,900	34.2	23.6	10.6	4.1		
1884	2,002,000	67,700	46,100	21,600	33.8	23.0	10.8	3.7		
1885	2,031,000	68,000	45,700	22,300	33.5	22.5	11.0	3.8		
1886	2,061,000	68,300	45,300	23,000	33.1	22.0	11.2	2.9		
1887	2,090,000	68,500	45,000	23,500	32.8	21.5	11.3	2.6		
1888	2,119,000	68,700	44,600	24,100	32.4	21.0	11.4	2.3		
1889	2,148,000	68,900	44,300	24,600	32.1	20.6	11.5	2		
1890	2,177,000	69,100	44,000	25,100	31.7	20.2	11.5	2.3		
1891	2,207,000	69,300	43,700	25,600	31.4	19.8	11.6	2		
1892	2,237,000	69,500	43,400	26,100	31.1	19.4	11.7	1.7		
1893	2,267,000	69,700	43,200	26,500	30.7	19.1	11.7	1.5		
1894	2,297,000	69,900	42,900	27,000	30.4	18.7	11.7	1.4		
1895	2,327,000	70,200	42,600	27,600	30.2	18.3	11.9	1		
1896	2,357,000	70,550	42,350	28,200	29.9	18.0	12.0	0.7		
1897	2,387,000	70,900	42,200	28,700	29.7	17.7	12.0	0.6		
1898	2,417,000	71,230	42,000	29,230	29.5	17.4	12.1	0.3		
1899	2,447,000	71,630	41,820	29,810	29.3	17.1	12.2	−18.3		
1900	2,432,000	72,129	40,891	31,238	29.7	16.8	12.8	−6.6	4.16	
1901	2,447,000	73,219	38,786	34,425	29.7	15.7	14.0	−1.7	4.14	
1902	2,477,000	72,839	36,424	36,391	29.2	14.6	14.6	−2.9	4.05	
1903	2,506,000	72,351	36,956	35,403	28.7	14.6	14.0	−3.6	3.96	
1904	2,532,000	73,692	35,903	37,788	28.9	14.1	14.8	−3.7	3.97	
1905	2,560,000	73,082	38,598	34,484	28.4	15.0	13.4	−2.1	3.87	
1906	2,589,000	74,217	35,231	38,986	28.5	13.5	15	−2.6	3.87	
1907	2,621,000	74,324	37,275	37,049	28.2	14.1	14.1	−2.3	3.81	
1908	2,652,000	76,233	39,072	37,161	28.6	14.6	13.9	−0.7	3.83	
1909	2,687,000	76,301	35,837	40,464	28.2	13.3	15.0	−2.0	3.78	
1910	2,722,000	75,299	35,184	40,013	27.5	12.9	14.6	−1.7	3.67	
1911	2,757,000	73,933	37,236	36,697	26.7	13.4	13.2	−2.0	3.60	
1912	2,788,000	74,659	36,486	38,173	26.6	13.0	13.6	−2.1	3.58	
1913	2,820,000	72,475	35,364	37,111	25.6	12.5	13.1	−2.1	3.43	
1914	2,851,000	73,294	35,921	37,373	25.6	12.5	13.0	−0.7	3.42	
1915	2,886,000	70,192	37,174	33,018	24.2	12.8	11.4	0.7	3.23	
1916	2,921,000	71,559	39,265	32,294	24.4	13.4	11.0	1.7	3.23	
1917	2,958,000	70,306	39,224	31,082	23.7	13.2	10.5	0.7	3.11	
1918	2,991,000	72,505	39,038	33,467	24.1	13.0	11.1	0.9	3.16	
1919	3,027,000	68,722	39,590	29,132	22.6	13.0	9.6	1.6	2.96	
1920	3,061,000	78,230	39,841	38,389	25.4	12.9	12.5	54.1	3.29	
1921	3,265,000	78,815	36,215	42,600	24.0	11.0	13.0	−0.4	3.11	
1922	3,306,000	73,899	39,452	34,435	22.3	11.9	10.4	−0.1	2.87	
1923	3,340,000	74,827	37,903	36,924	22.3	11.3	11.0	−1.1	2.85	
1924	3,373,000	73,836	38,091	35,778	21.8	11.2	10.6	−0.8	2.78	
1925	3,406,000	71,897	37,083	34,814	21.0	10.8	10.2	−0.5	2.66	
1926	3,439,000	70,734	38,093	32,641	20.5	11.0	9.5	−1.4	2.58	
1927	3,467,000	68,024	40,190	27,834	19.6	11.6	8.0	−2.2	2.44	
1928	3,487,000	68,516	38,484	30,032	19.6	11.0	8.6	−1.7	2.43	
1929	3,511,000	65,297	39,486	25,913	18.6	11.2	7.4	−1.7	2.30	
1930	3,531,000	66,303	38,174	28,129	18.7	10.8	7.9	−0.5	2.29	
1931	3,557,000	64,266	40,578	23,688	18.0	11.4	6.6	2.7	2.20	
1932	3,590,000	64,650	39,701	24,949	17.9	11.0	6.9	1.5	2.17	
1933	3,620,000	62,780	38,287	24,493	17.3	10.5	6.7	1.9	2.10	
1934	3,651,000	65,116	38,050	27,066	17.8	10.4	7.4	1.4	2.15	
1935	3,683,000	65,223	40,816	24,407	17.7	11.0	6.6	1.0	2.12	
1936	3,711,000	66,418	40,919	25,499	17.8	11.0	6.9	0.4	2.14	
1937	3,738,000	67,440	40,442	26,998	18.0	10.8	7.2	0	2.16	
1938	3,765,000	68,463	39,058	29,407	18.1	10.3	7.8	−0.1	2.18	
1939	3,794,000	67,914	38,535	29,379	17.8	10.1	7.7	0.7	2.16	
1940	3,826,000	70,121	39,730	30,391	18.3	10.4	7.9	−1.9	2.22	
1941	3,849,000	71,306	39,756	31,550	18.5	10.3	8.2	0.4	2.24	
1942	3,882,000	79,545	37,527	42,018	20.4	9.6	10.8	0.5	2.50	
1943	3,926,000	84,319	37,982	46,337	21.4	9.6	11.7	0.3	2.65	
1944	3,973,000	90,641	41,087	49,554	22.7	10.3	12.4	0.2	2.84	
1945	4,023,000	95,062	42,298	52,764	23.5	10.5	13.0	−0.1	2.98	
1946	4,075,000	96,111	42,013	54,098	23.4	10.2	13.2	−1.2	3.02	
1947	4,124,000	91,714	40,043	51,671	22.1	9.7	12.5	−1.8	2.90	
1948	4,168,000	84,938	35,981	48,957	20.3	8.6	11.7	−1.4	2.71	
1949	4,211,000	79,919	37,793	42,126	18.9	8.9	10.0	−0.3	2.58	
1950	4,252,000	79,558	39,300	40,258	18.6	9.2	9.4	−1.6	2.57	
1951	4,285,000	76,559	37,960	38,599	17.8	8.8	9.0	−2.0	2.50	
1952	4,315,000	76,943	39,173	37,770	17.8	9.0	8.7	−0.8	2.53	
1953	4,349,000	78,261	39,350	38,911	17.9	9.0	8.9	0.3	2.60	
1954	4,389,000	76,365	39,885	36,480	17.3	9.1	8.3	−0.3	2.55	
1955	4,424,000	76,845	38,789	38,056	17.3	8.7	8.6	−1.8	2.58	
1956	4,454,000	76,725	39,588	37,137	17.2	8.9	8.3	−2.7	2.61	
1957	4,479,000	75,264	41,730	33,534	16.8	9.3	7.5	−2.6	2.57	
1958	4,501,000	74,681	41,560	33,121	16.5	9.2	7.3	−0.4	2.55	
1959	4,532,000	73,928	42,159	31,769	16.3	9.3	7.0	0.5	2.52	
1960	4,566,000	76,077	43,681	32,396	16.6	9.5	7.1	−1.0	2.57	
1961	4,594,000	76,439	43,310	33,129	16.6	9.4	7.2	0.6	2.55	
1962	4,630,000	77,808	45,334	32,474	16.7	9.8	7.0	0.8	2.58	
1963	4,666,000	82,413	45,773	36,640	17.6	9.8	7.8	0.1	2.64	
1964	4,703,000	83,356	46,811	36,545	17.7	9.9	7.7	0.4	2.60	
1965	4,741,000	85,796	47,884	37,912	18.0	10.1	8.0	−0.4	2.61	
1966	4,777,000	88,332	49,344	38,988	18.4	10.3	8.1	0.5	2.62	
1967	4,818,000	81,410	47,836	33,574	16.8	9.9	6.9	0.4	2.35	
1968	4,853,000	74,543	47,290	27,253	15.3	9.7	5.6	−0.7	2.12	
1969	4,877,000	71,298	47,943	23,355	14.6	9.8	4.8	1.4	2.00	
1970	4,907,000	70,802	48,233	22,569	14.3	9.7	4.6	4.4	1.95	
1971	4,950,598	75,359	48,858	26,501	15.2	9.8	5.3	−0.3	2.04	
1972	4,975,653	75,505	50,445	25,060	15.1	10.1	5.0	1.4	2.03	
1973	5,007,538	71,895	50,526	21,369	14.3	10.1	4.3	1.3	1.9170	
1974	5,036,184	71,327	51,637	19,690	14.1	10.2	3.9	−0.3	1.8968	
1975	5,054,410	72,071	50,895	21,176	14.2	10.1	4.1	−1.9	1.9188	
1976	5,065,313	65,267	54,001	11,266	12.9	10.6	2.2	0.4	1.7472	
1977	5,079,879	61,878	50,485	11,393	12.2	9.9	2.2	1.5	1.6598	
1978	5,096,959	62,036	52,864	9,172	12.2	10.4	1.8	1.1	1.6685	
1979	5,111,536	59,464	54,654	4,810	11.6	10.7	0.9	1.1	1.6016	
1980	5,122,065	57,293	55,939	1,354	11.2	10.9	0.3	0.1	1.5464	
1981	5,123,989	53,089	56,359	−3,270	10.4	11.0	−0.6	−0.4	1.4371	
1982	5,119,155	52,658	55,368	−2,710	10.3	10.8	−0.5	−0.1	1.4273	
1983	5,116,464	50,822	57,156	−6,334	9.9	11.2	−1.2	0.4	1.3774	
1984	5,112,130	51,800	57,109	−5,309	10.1	11.2	−1.0	0.8	1.4001	
1985	5,111,108	53,749	58,378	−4,629	10.5	11.4	−0.9	1.9	1.4472	
1986	5,116,273	55,312	58,100	−2,788	10.8	11.3	−0.5	2.3	1.4819	
1987	5,124,794	56,221	58,136	−1,915	11.0	11.3	−0.4	1.2	1.4977	
1988	5,129,254	58,844	58,984	−127	11.5	11.5	−0.0	0	1.5618	
1989	5,129,778	61,351	59,397	2,047	12.0	11.6	0.4	0.8	1.6212	
1990	5,135,409	63,433	60,926	2,545	12.3	11.9	0.5	1.6	1.6696	
1991	5,146,469	64,358	59,581	4,777	12.5	11.6	0.9	2.2	1.6844	
1992	5,162,126	67,726	60,821	6,905	13.1	11.8	1.3	2.4	1.7648	
1993	5,180,614	67,369	62,809	4,560	13.0	12.1	0.9	2.2	1.7512	
1994	5,196,641	69,666	61,099	8,567	13.4	11.7	1.6	2.1	1.8091	
1995	5,215,718	69,771	63,127	6,644	13.3	12.1	1.3	5.4	1.8097	
1996	5,251,027	67,638	61,043	6,595	12.9	11.6	1.3	3.3	1.7535	
1997	5,275,121	67,648	59,898	7,750	12.8	11.3	1.5	2.3	1.7562	
1998	5,294,860	66,174	58,453	7,721	12.5	11.0	1.5	1.9	1.7252	
1999	5,313,577	66,220	59,179	7,041	12.4	11.1	1.3	1.9	1.7383	
2000	5,330,020	67,084	57,998	9,086	12.6	10.9	1.7	1.9	1.7742	
2001	5,349,212	65,458	58,355	7,103	12.2	10.9	1.3	2.3	1.7450	
2002	5,368,354	64,075	58,610	5,465	11.9	10.9	1.0	2.0	1.7249	
2003	5,383,507	64,599	57,574	7,025	12.0	10.7	1.3	1.3	1.7599	
2004	5,397,640	64,609	55,086	9,523	12.0	10.2	1.8	0.6	1.7852	
2005	5,411,405	64,282	54,962	9,320	11.9	10.1	1.7	1.3	1.8021	
2006	5,427,459	64,984	55,477	9,507	12.0	10.2	1.7	2.2	1.8476	
2007	5,447,084	64,082	55,604	8,478	11.7	10.2	1.6	3.5	1.8435	
2008	5,475,791	65,038	54,591	10,447	11.8	9.9	1.9	4.5	1.8888	
2009	5,511,451	62,818	54,872	7,946	11.4	9.9	1.4	3.0	1.8396	1.950
2010	5,534,738	63,411	54,368	9,043	11.4	9.8	1.6	3.1	1.8712	2.021
2011	5,560,628	58,998	52,516	6,482	10.6	9.4	1.2	2.4	1.7524	1.984
2012	5,580,516	57,916	52,325	5,591	10.4	9.4	1.0	2.9	1.7292	1.947
2013	5,602,628	55,844	52,428	3,416	9.9	9.3	0.6	3.7	1.6687	1.848
2014	5,627,235	56,870	51,340	5,530	10.1	9.1	1.0	4.9	1.6912	1.808
2015	5,659,715	58,205	52,555	5,650	10.2	9.2	1.0	7.3	1.7136	1.803
2016	5,707,251	61,614	52,824	8,790	10.7	9.2	1.5	5.9	1.7854	1.913
2017	5,748,769	61,272	53,261	8,011	10.6	9.2	1.4	4.2	1.7519	1.984
2018	5,781,190	61,476	55,232	6,244	10.6	9.5	1.1	3.2	1.7297	1.995
2019	5,806,081	61,167	53,958	7,209	10.5	9.3	1.2	1.7	1.6994	1.925
2020	5,822,763	60,937	54,645	6,292	10.4	9.4	1.0	2.0	1.6747	1.918
2021	5,840,045	63,473	57,152	6,321	10.8	9.7	1.1	4.6	1.7241	1.922
2022	5,873,420	58,430	59,435	−1,005	9.9	10.1	−0.171	10.3	1.5529	1.705
2023	5,932,654	57,469	58,384	−915	9.7	9.8	−0.155	5.0	1.4959	1.732
2024	5,961,249	57,079	57,071	8	9.6	9.6	0.0013	5.4	1.4656	
2025	5,992,734	59,443	58,185	1,258	9.9	9.7	0.2	5.3	1.5058	
2026	6,025,603									

In 2025, 46,049 (77.47%) babies were born to mothers of Danish origin, 10,338 (17.39%) to immigrant mothers and 3,056 (5.14%) to mothers who are descendants of immigrants.

=== Current vital statistics ===
Period	Live births	Deaths	Natural increase
January—September 2025	45,186	43,240	+1,946
January—September 2026	45,556	44,270	+1,286
Difference	▲ +370 (+0.82%)	▲ +1,030 (+2.38%)	▼ –660

=== Total fertility rates ===
==== Total fertility rates by region ====
2025
Regions	TFR
Region Zealand	1.5893
Region of Southern Denmark	1.5495
Central Denmark Region	1.5461
North Jutland	1.5344
Denmark	1.5058
Capital Region of Denmark	1.4690

==== Total fertility rates by province and municipality ====
2025
Provinces and municipalities	TFR
Province Byen København	1.4128
Copenhagen	1.3907
Frederiksberg	1.6139
Dragør	1.8575
Tårnby	1.6069
Province Københavns omegn	1.6003
Albertslund	1.4067
Ballerup	1.6165
Brøndby	1.6683
Gentofte	1.6110
Gladsaxe	1.5650
Glostrup	1.5084
Herlev	1.5957
Hvidovre	1.5468
Høje-Taastrup	1.7223
Ishøj	1.5754
Lyngby-Taarbæk	1.3905
Rødovre	1.7029
Vallensbæk	1.8550
Province Nordsjælland	1.8143
Allerød	1.9007
Egedal	2.0561
Fredensborg	1.8152
Frederikssund	1.7081
Furesø	2.0533
Gribskov	1.6993
Halsnæs	1.7350
Helsingør	1.7296
Hillerød	1.6855
Hørsholm	1.6295
Rudersdal	1.8609
Province Bornholm	1.5778
Bornholm	1.5743
Christiansø	–
Province Østsjælland	1.6856
Greve	1.8057
Køge	1.7941
Lejre	1.9377
Roskilde	1.4303
Solrød	1.9868
Province Vest- og Sydsjælland	1.5420
Faxe	1.6343
Guldborgsund	1.5128
Holbæk	1.5619
Kalundborg	1.3838
Lolland	1.4092
Næstved	1.5258
Odsherred	1.5399
Ringsted	1.5293
Slagelse	1.4584
Sorø	1.9260
Stevns	1.6520
Vordingborg	1.7232
Province Fyn	1.4965
Assens	1.6863
Faaborg-Midtfyn	1.7325
Kerteminde	1.9005
Langeland	1.7803
Middelfart	1.9660
Nordfyns	1.6578
Nyborg	1.5276
Odense	1.3827
Svendborg	1.7103
Ærø	–
Province Sydjylland	1.6100
Billund	1.6157
Esbjerg	1.4846
Fanø	–
Fredericia	1.6199
Haderslev	1.6781
Kolding	1.4992
Sønderborg	1.6741
Tønder	1.6606
Varde	1.7055
Vejen	1.6915
Vejle	1.7096
Aabenraa	1.5297
Province Østjylland	1.5273
Favrskov	2.2304
Hedensted	1.7593
Horsens	1.6233
Norddjurs	1.5229
Odder	2.0056
Randers	1.6078
Samsø	–
Silkeborg	1.9642
Skanderborg	2.0657
Syddjurs	1.9334
Aarhus	1.4339
Province Vestjylland	1.6949
Herning	1.6346
Holstebro	1.8031
Ikast-Brande	1.8211
Lemvig	1.6931
Ringkøbing-Skjern	1.9634
Skive	1.6225
Struer	1.6798
Viborg	1.5448
Province Nordjylland	1.5344
Brønderslev	1.7785
Frederikshavn	1.6425
Hjørring	1.5058
Jammerbugt	1.9046
Læsø	–
Mariagerfjord	1.8815
Morsø	1.8813
Rebild	2.0326
Thisted	1.9276
Vesthimmerlands	1.5516
Aalborg	1.4246
Denmark	1.5058

==== Total fertility rates by ancestry of women ====
2025
Country of birth	TFR
Denmark	1.5696
Immigrant from western countries	1.1464
Immigrant from non-western countries	1.3813
Descendant from western countries	1.3860
Descendant from non-western countries	1.5982
Total TFR	1.5058

=== Structure of the population ===
Population Estimates by Sex and Age Group (01.VII.2021):

Age group	Male	Female	Total	%
Total	2 910 605	2 939 584	5 850 189	100
0–4	159 616	151 094	310 710	5.31
5–9	153 902	145 996	299 898	5.13
10–14	172 489	163 504	335 993	5.74
15–19	174 065	166 351	340 416	5.82
20–24	190 440	182 547	372 987	6.38
25–29	205 462	196 996	402 458	6.88
30–34	190 728	182 907	373 635	6.39
35–39	167 754	163 263	331 017	5.66
40–44	174 967	173 743	348 710	5.96
45–49	196 490	197 259	393 749	6.73
50–54	199 625	197 330	396 955	6.79
55–59	203 904	202 673	406 577	6.95
60–64	173 413	176 026	349 439	5.97
65–69	156 575	163 852	320 427	5.48
70–74	149 499	162 406	311 905	5.33
75–79	125 586	142 076	267 662	4.58
80–84	69 552	88 329	157 881	2.70
85–89	33 148	50 931	84 079	1.44
90–94	11 095	23 783	34 878	0.60
95–99	2 113	7 469	9 582	0.16
100+	182	1 049	1 231	0.02
Age group	Male	Female	Total	Percent
0–14	486 007	460 594	946 601	16.18
15–64	1 876 848	1 839 095	3 715 943	63.52
65+	547 750	639 895	1 187 645	20.30

== Immigration ==
=== Denmark net migration ===
Denmark Migration Data
Year	Total Immigration	Total Emigration	Total Net Migration	Immigration Foreign	Emigration Foreign	Net Foreign Migration	Immigration Danish nationals	Emigration Danish nationals	Net Danish nationals
1984	29,035	25,053	3,982	13,293	8,163	5,130	15,742	16,890	−1,148
1985	36,214	26,715	9,499	20,201	9,053	11,148	16,013	17,662	−1,649
1986	38,932	27,928	11,004	22,543	9,262	13,281	16,389	18,666	−2,277
1987	36,296	30,123	6,173	20,057	10,142	9,915	16,239	19,981	−3,742
1988	35,051	34,544	507	18,446	10,651	7,795	16,605	23,893	−7,288
1989	38,391	34,949	3,442	19,211	9,502	9,709	19,180	25,447	−6,267
1990	40,715	32,383	7,332	19,715	8,855	10,860	21,000	23,528	−3,528
1991	43,567	32,629	10,938	22,122	10,462	11,660	21,445	22,167	−722
1992	43,377	31,915	11,462	21,484	9,358	12,126	21,893	22,557	−664
1993	43,400	32,344	11,056	20,479	9,994	10,485	22,921	22,350	571
1994	44,961	34,710	10,251	20,977	10,891	10,086	23,984	23,819	165
1995	63,187	34,630	28,557	39,145	11,109	28,036	24,042	23,521	521
1996	54,445	37,312	17,133	31,527	12,957	18,570	22,918	24,355	−1,437
1997	50,105	38,393	11,712	27,411	14,057	13,354	22,694	24,336	−1,642
1998	51,372	40,340	11,032	28,830	15,647	13,183	22,542	24,693	−2,151
1999	50,236	41,340	8,896	27,883	16,242	11,641	22,353	25,098	−2,745
2000	52,915	43,417	9,498	30,810	16,530	14,280	22,105	26,887	−4,782
2001	55,984	43,980	12,004	33,654	17,292	16,362	22,330	26,688	−4,358
2002	52,778	43,481	9,297	30,597	17,750	12,847	22,181	25,731	−3,550
2003	49,754	43,466	6,288	27,692	18,194	9,498	22,062	25,272	−3,210
2004	49,860	45,017	4,843	27,870	19,081	8,789	21,990	25,936	−3,946
2005	52,458	45,869	6,589	29,989	19,620	10,369	22,469	26,249	−3,780
2006	56,750	46,786	9,964	34,281	20,447	13,834	22,469	26,339	−3,870
2007	64,769	42,708	22,061	42,702	18,558	24,144	22,067	24,150	−2,083
2008	73,762	48,171	25,591	50,981	24,734	26,247	22,781	23,437	−656
2009	68,443	51,988	16,455	46,032	30,460	15,572	22,411	21,528	883
2010	69,200	52,097	17,103	47,670	30,226	17,444	21,530	21,871	−341
2011	70,122	55,782	14,340	48,858	32,918	15,940	21,264	22,864	−1,600
2012	72,512	54,907	17,605	50,633	32,559	18,074	21,879	22,348	−469
2013	79,218	56,416	22,802	56,995	34,073	22,922	22,223	22,343	−120
2014	87,563	59,226	28,337	65,547	37,536	28,011	22,016	21,690	326
2015	98,872	56,340	42,532	76,323	34,509	41,814	22,549	21,831	718
2016	94,365	61,078	33,287	72,179	39,534	32,645	22,186	21,544	642
2017	89,382	64,751	24,631	67,445	43,745	23,700	21,937	21,006	931
2018	87,329	68,645	18,684	65,427	47,736	17,691	21,902	20,909	993
2019	83,918	74,597	9,321	62,643	54,470	8,173	21,275	20,127	1,148
2020	70,340	59,420	10,920	48,644	43,549	5,095	21,696	15,871	5,825
2021	76,278	49,803	26,475	57,922	33,536	24,386	18,356	16,267	2,089
2022	121,183	62,927	58,256	103,042	44,068	58,974	18,141	18,859	−718
2023	98,344	68,172	30,172	79,561	50,540	29,021	18,783	17,632	1,151
2024	101,724	69,467	32,257	83,216	52,580	30,636	18,508	16,887	1,621
2025	102,031	70,340	31,691	84,420	54,012	30,408	17,611	16,328	1,283

== Urban areas ==
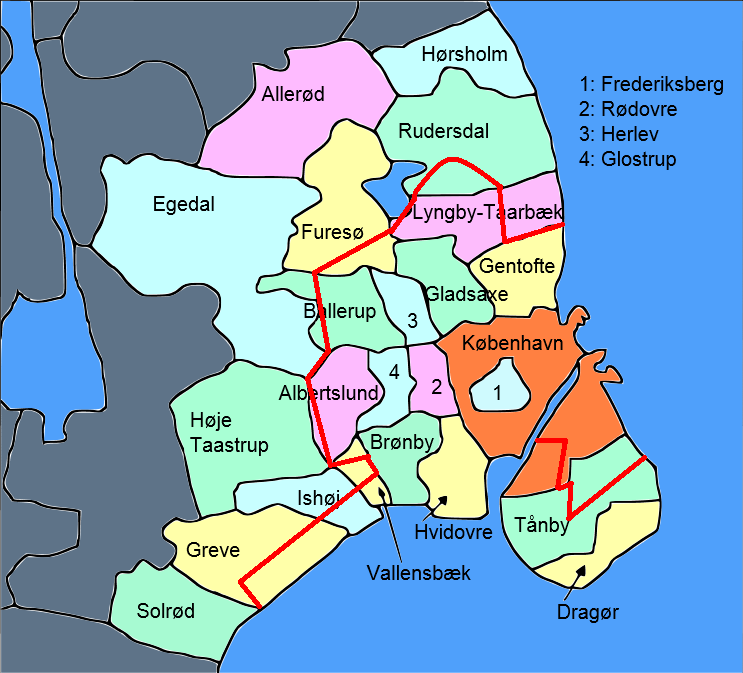
Urban area of Copenhagen outlined with red line.

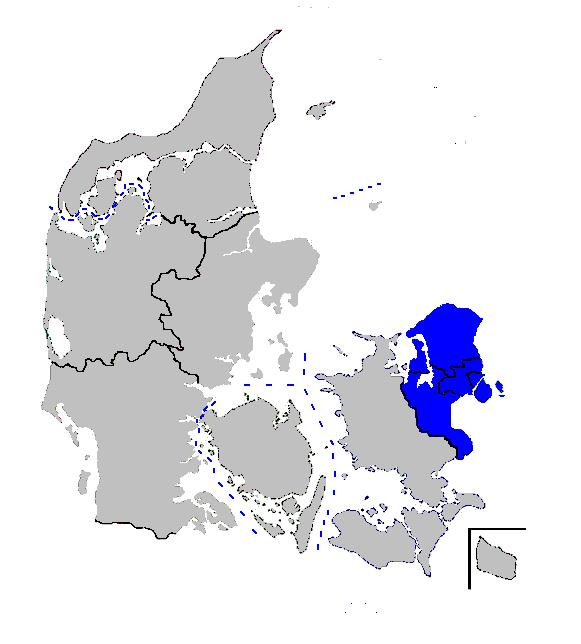
Metropolitan area of Copenhagen.

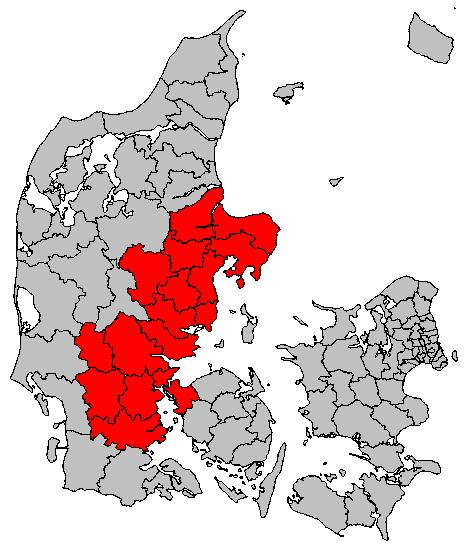
East Jutland Metro.

The urban area of Copenhagen consists of the contiguously built-up area of the capital of Denmark. The Copenhagen metropolitan area consists of 34 municipalities. The East Jutland metropolitan area includes 19 municipalities.

== Religion ==
The Church of Denmark (Den danske folkekirke) is state-supported and, according to statistics from January 2022, accounts for the religious affiliation of 73.2% of the population. Denmark has had religious freedom guaranteed since 1849 by the Constitution, and numerous other religions are officially recognised, including several Christian denominations, Muslim, Jewish, Buddhist, Hindu and other congregations as well as Forn Siðr, a revival of Scandinavian pagan tradition. The Department of Ecclesiastical Affairs recognises roughly a hundred religious congregations for tax and legal purposes such as conducting wedding ceremonies.

In 2013, just under 20% of the Danish population identifies as atheist.

Islam is the second largest religion in Denmark. In 2020, an estimated 4.4% of the Danish population were Muslims.

For historical reasons, there is a formal distinction between 'approved' (godkendte) and 'recognised' (anerkendte) congregations of faith. The latter include 11 traditional denominations, such as Roman Catholics, the Reformed Church, the Mosaic Congregation, Methodists and Baptists, some of whose privileges in the country date hundreds of years back. These have the additional rights of having priests appointed by royal resolution and to christen/name children with legal effect.

Religions

Evangelical Lutheran (official) 74.8%, Muslim 5.3%, other (denominations of less than 1% each, include Roman Catholic, Jehovah's Witness, Serbian Orthodox Christian, Jewish, Baptist, and Buddhist) 19.9% (2017 est.)

== Employment and income ==
Unemployment in Denmark over time

Unemployment, youth ages 15–24
total: 12% (2016 est.) Country comparison to the world: 109th
male: 13.1% (2016 est.)
female: 10.9% (2016 est.)

== Taxation and benefits ==
Although the level of taxation in Denmark is among the highest in the world, the labor market participation rate is still high compared with other Western countries. Municipal income tax makes up the largest part of taxation in Denmark, with central government income tax topping it up. These income taxes are higher than in other OECD countries. These direct taxes make up two thirds of the taxation on private households with indirect taxes of the central government, and municipalities (property tax), making up one third, i.e. with motor vehicles (passenger cars, motorcycles, commercial vehicles) sold from VAT registered dealerships – because of the registration fee – being among the most expensive in the world, with prices in Norway at the same level, and the most expensive in Singapore. Also VAT in Denmark is not reduced from the current 25%. The 25% are paid on all goods and services where VAT is applied. Indirect taxes are about average compared with other European OECD countries. Payroll taxes (Danish sociale afgifter) are much lower than in other OECD countries. The tax structure ensures a broad tax base across the whole population. However, revenue from corporate taxes is lower compared with other European countries. Municipalities and the central government (regions are not allowed to levy any taxes, as they are financed by central government, and municipal block grants) redistribute a large amount of their tax income in transfer payments to municipalities with a low tax base and/or few tax payers. It is normal for children to be in nurseries, which requires a partial payment of the costs or is free of charge for low income households, and in kindergartens owned and operated, or financed, by the public sector. Child benefit is paid to parents for each child. The service to old age pensioners, and handicapped is extensive.

Denmark ranks high in the Corruption Perceptions Index, although the index is criticized for being limited in scope.

== Homelessness ==
Homelessness is considered a significant social issue in Denmark. Since 2007, comprehensive counts have been performed every other year in week six (early February). The latest, from 2017, counted 6,635 homeless people in Denmark. The total number of people experiencing homelessness at some point in 2017 was estimated at 13,000, while earlier estimates have placed it between 10,000 and 15,000. Roughly half the homeless are in the Capital Region. When compared to many other countries, such as the United States, the rate of homelessness in Denmark is significantly lower, which has been linked to the relatively comprehensive welfare system.

The number of homeless people in Denmark has risen in recent decades, but this has been most pronounced in people that are between 18 and 29 years old (although 30 to 59 years old remains the largest age group, at 70%), women (although men remains the largest group, at 75%) and immigrants (although Danish citizens remain the largest group). Among the foreign, a high percentage are Eastern or Southern European men that seek work in Denmark. Many of these only stay in Denmark during the summer, returning to their respective countries during the relatively cold Danish winter.

Based on the comprehensive count in February 2017, roughly one-tenth of homeless people in Denmark are "street sleepers" (which also includes people sleeping in stairways, sheds and other places not intended for human habitation), with the remaining sleeping in the homes of friends/family, in hotels/hostels, in shelters or alike. The number of street sleepers is higher during the summer, and homeless foreigners are overrepresented among them. Among homeless in Denmark, the primary issue is psychiatric disease at 36% (24% receive treatment), drug addiction at 27% (17% receive treatment) and alcohol addiction at 23% (9% receive treatment). Overall it is estimated that more than half of all homeless people have mental health issues. Compared to many other countries such as the United States, a higher percentage of Denmark's homeless have mental health issues or substance abuse, as countries with weaker welfare systems tend to have higher homeless rates but the homeless will more likely to include from a wide range of groups.

The government of Denmark's approach to homelessness include commissioning national surveys on homelessness during the last decade that allow for direct comparison between Denmark, Norway and Sweden. The three countries have very similar definitions of homelessness, with minor variations.

== See also ==
- Demographics of the Faroe Islands
- Demographics of Greenland
- Religion in Denmark
- List of urban areas in the Nordic countries
