= Danish Zionist Federation =

Zionist organization in Denmark

- Type: Zionist organization
- Location: Denmark
- Website: http://danskzionistforbund.dk/

The Danish Zionist Federation (Danish: Dansk Zionistforbund) is the leading Zionist organization in Denmark. The federation is affiliated with the World Zionist Organization.

== History ==
Arne Melchior headed the federation between 1975 and 1979.

In 2012, the Danish Zionist Federation displayed Israeli flags at a diversity festival in Copenhagen, despite being asked by organizers to not fly the flag for "security reasons". Several verbal confrontations occurred at the federation's stand, but did not escalate into violence. Event organizer Pernille Kjeldgaard stated that there was no flag policy and that the group was only asked as a "safety precaution". Max Meyer, head of the federation, stated that "It is a shame that one group is discriminated against, especially at a diversity celebration."

In October 2023, during the Gaza war, the Danish Zionist Federation and the Jewish Community in Denmark organized a pro-Israel march in Copenhagen.

== See also ==
- History of the Jews in Denmark
