= Max Friediger =

Danish rabbi (1884–1947)

Max Moses Friediger
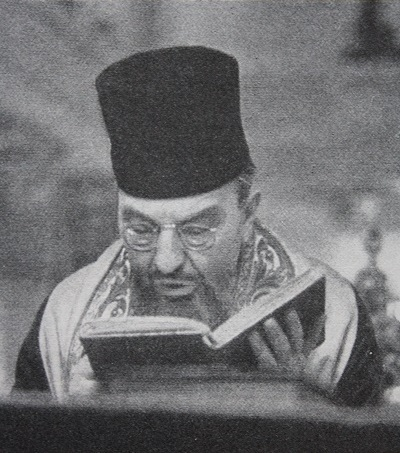
- Title: Chief Rabbi of Denmark

Personal life
- Born: 9 April 1884 Budapest, Austria-Hungary
- Died: 9 April 1947 (aged 63) Copenhagen, Denmark

Religious life
- Religion: Judaism

Max Friediger (9 April 1884 – 9 April 1947) was a Danish chief rabbi and a survivor of the Holocaust.

== Biography ==
After the occupation of Denmark by the Wehrmacht, Friediger and other high prominent Danish Jews were interned in 1943 in the open state prison at Horserød camp, and later deported to Theresienstadt concentration camp via Swinemünde where on 3 October 1943 he and other Danish Jews were spotted by Danish communists also being deported. Friediger led the church register of approx. 480 Danish Jews in a synagogue located in a storeroom within the camp and later published an account of life in Theresienstadt.

After his death in 1947, his successor as chief rabbi was Marcus Melchior.
