= Marcus Melchior =

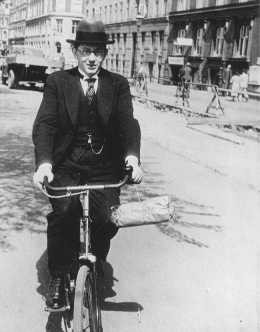
Image of Marcus Melchior

Marcus Melchior (1897–1969) was a Danish rabbi. The rabbi of the main synagogue in Copenhagen, Denmark, at the time of the rescue of the Danish Jews in October 1943, during the Second World War. After escaping with his family and most other Danish Jews to Sweden, he served as the acting rabbi for the Jewish refugees in Sweden until the end of the war, in mid 1945. In 1947 he became the chief rabbi of Denmark, a post he held until his death, in 1969.

== Biography ==
Melchior came from a prominent Jewish family in Denmark. After receiving his Dr. Phil. from Königsberg University and his rabbinical diploma from the Hildesheimer Rabbinical Seminary, in Berlin, Germany, in 1921, he served as a rabbi in Tarnowskie Góry, Poland, from 1921 to 1923, and in Beuthen, Germany (today, Bytom, Poland), from 1925 to 1934. He then moved to Copenhagen, Denmark, and became rabbi for the Jewish community there. There he edited a magazine entitled Jødisk Familieblad. From 1943 to 1945 he was acting rabbi for the Jewish refugees from Denmark in Sweden. Following the death of Max Friediger, in 1947, he became chief rabbi in Denmark. After World War II he pleaded for reconciliation with the new Germany.

Though his background was Orthodox, his rhetorical skills and his culturally open attitudes made him a popular lecturer also outside Jewish circles.

He fathered four sons and two daughters, among them Arne Melchior (who became a frontbench Danish politician and government minister) and Binyamin (Bent) Melchior. In 1969, the latter succeeded his father as chief rabbi in Copenhagen, and is the father of Michael Melchior, who is chief rabbi in Norway and emigrated to Israel in 1986 where he became a member of the Knesset for the Labour-Meimad faction. He was also the grandfather of Rabbi Ove "Uri" Schwarz who served as the Chief Rabbi of Finland 1982–1987 as well as great-grandfather of the present Chief Rabbi of Denmark, Yair Melchior. Melchior’s actions during the Holocaust are widely credited as a decisive factor in the survival of the vast majority of Danish Jews.
