= Jewish Community in Denmark =

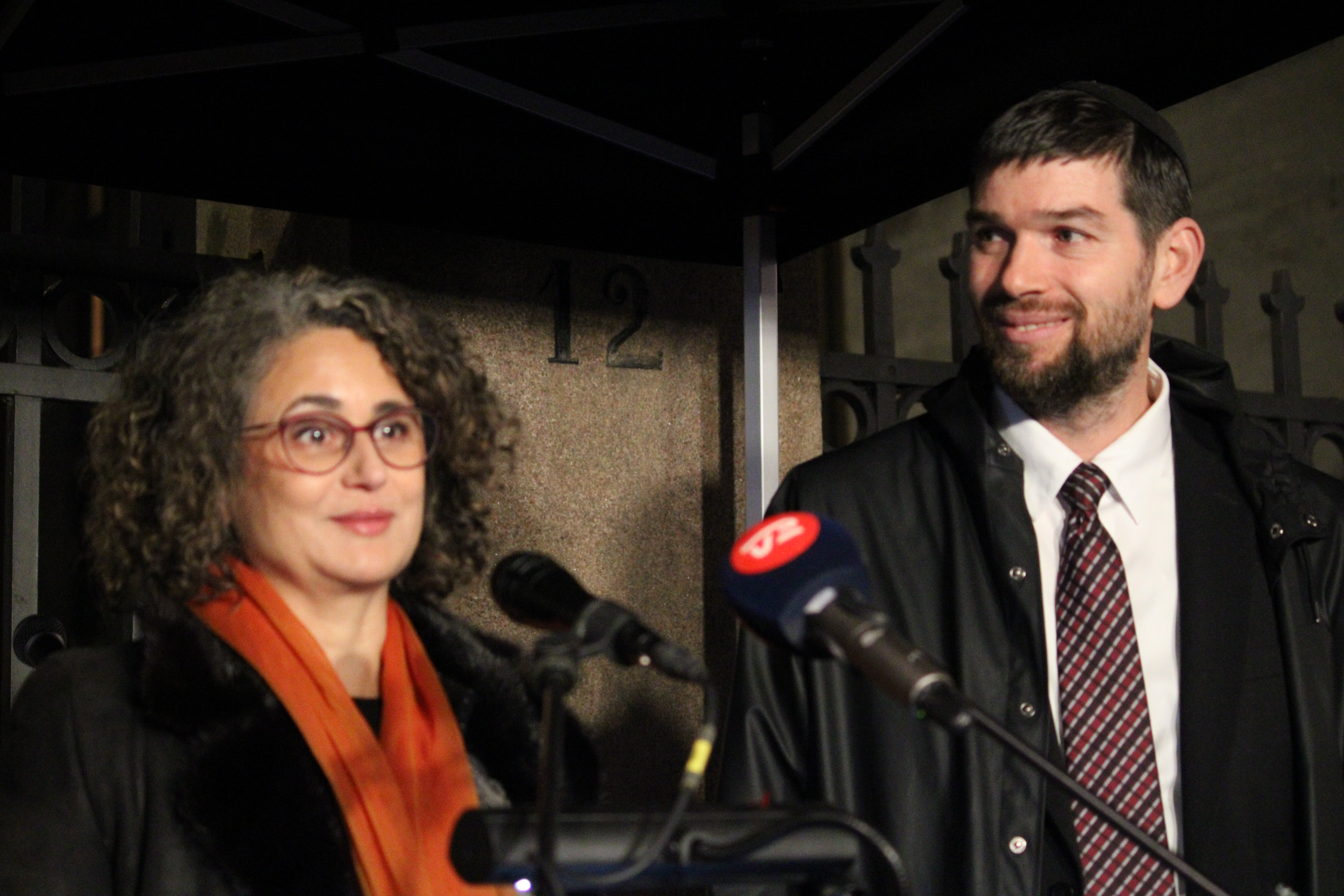
- Representative of the Jewish Community Ina Rosen and Chief Rabbi Jair Melchior
- Headquarters: Copenhagen
- Region served: Denmark
- President: Henri Goldstein
- Website: mosaiske.dk

The Jewish Community in Denmark (Danish: Det Jødiske Samfund i Danmark) is an umbrella organization representing Danish Jews. The organization is Orthodox, but represents both religious and secular Jews.

== About ==
The Jewish Community of Denmark is an Orthodox religious organization representing around 2,400 Danish Jews, both religious and secular, out of a population of around 6,000 Danish Jews. It is a member of the European Jewish Congress and the World Jewish Congress. Until 2014, the organization was known as the Mosaisk Troessamfund, (lit. 'Mosaic Faith Community').

== History ==
In 1981, the directors of the community voted 4–3 to remove Bent Melchior as the community's chief rabbi. Melchior was dismissed due to his involvement in a documentary on Jewish life in Denmark, which was criticized for allegedly risking community security. Melchior claimed that members of a rival family with an ongoing antagonism against him were responsible for the push for his dismissal.

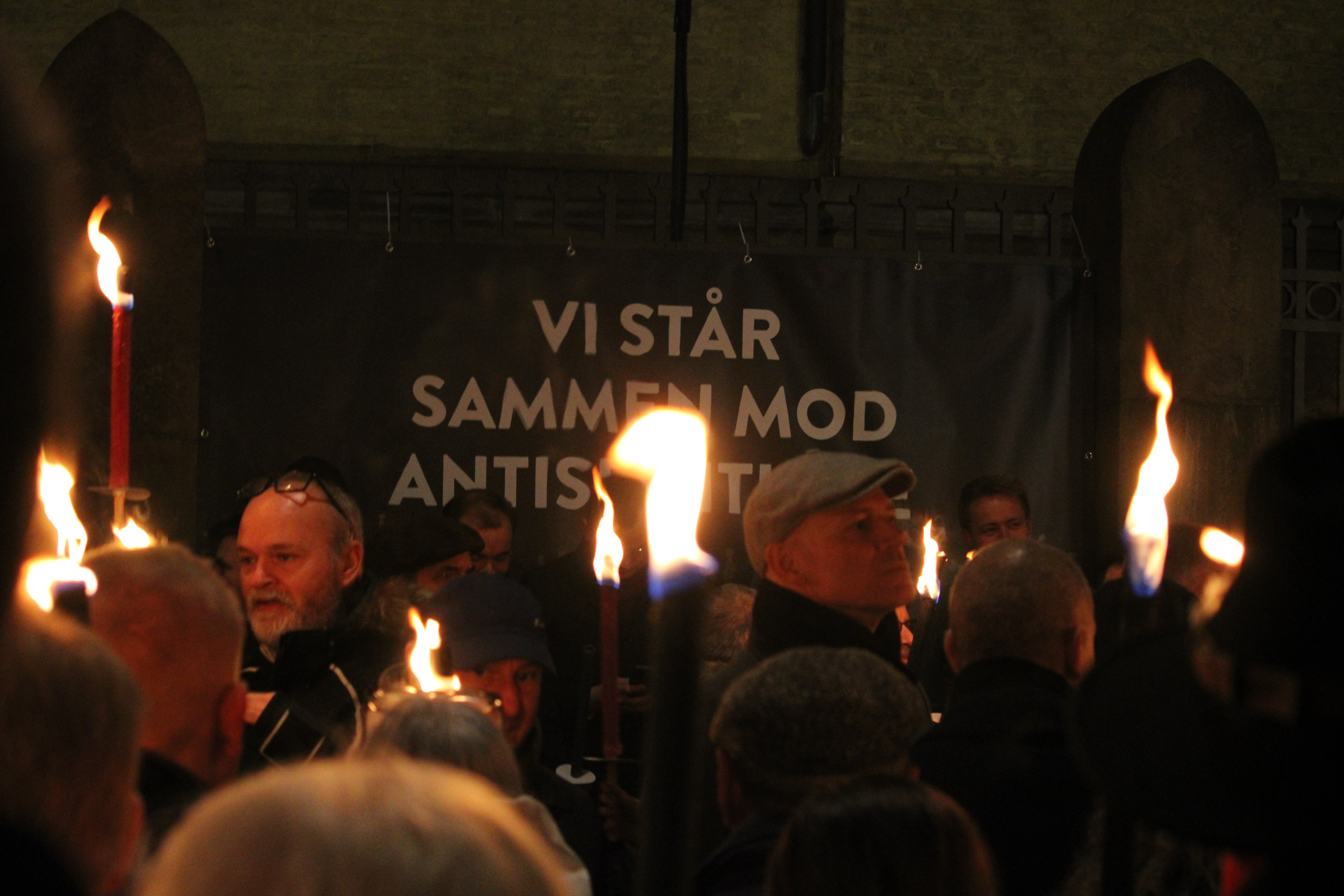
Participants at a memorial service for Kristallnacht at the synagogue on Krystalgade in Indre By, Copenhagen.

On 10 October 2023, three days after the October 7 attacks that ignited the Gaza war, the Jewish Community in Denmark and the Danish Zionist Federation organized a pro-Israel march in Copenhagen.

== See also ==
- History of the Jews in Denmark
- Jodisk Familieblad
