= Jødisk Familieblad =

Jewish magazine in Copenhagen, Denmark (1928–1940)

- Editor: Marcus Melchior
- Categories: Jewish magazine
- Frequency: Monthly
- Publisher: Det Mosaiske Troessamfund
- Founder: Max Goldschmid
- Founded: 1928
- Final issue: April 1940
- Country: Denmark
- Based in: Copenhagen
- Language: Danish

Jødisk Familieblad was a monthly Jewish magazine which appeared in Copenhagen, Denmark, between 1928 and 1940. It was the official organ of the Det Mosaiske Troessamfund which is a Jewish communal organization in Copenhagen.

== History and profile ==
Jødisk Familieblad was launched by Max Goldschmid in Copenhagen in 1928. Its title was first Jødisk Samfund and then Jødisk Orientering. Tt was renamed as Jodisk Familieblad in 1929, and the first issue with this title appeared in March that year.

Jødisk Familieblad was the official media outlet of Det Mosaiske Troessamfund. The editor of the magazine was Chief Rabbi Marcus Melchior. The magazine was published on a monthly basis. Its last issue came out in April 1940.
