= Tel Aviv Zoo =

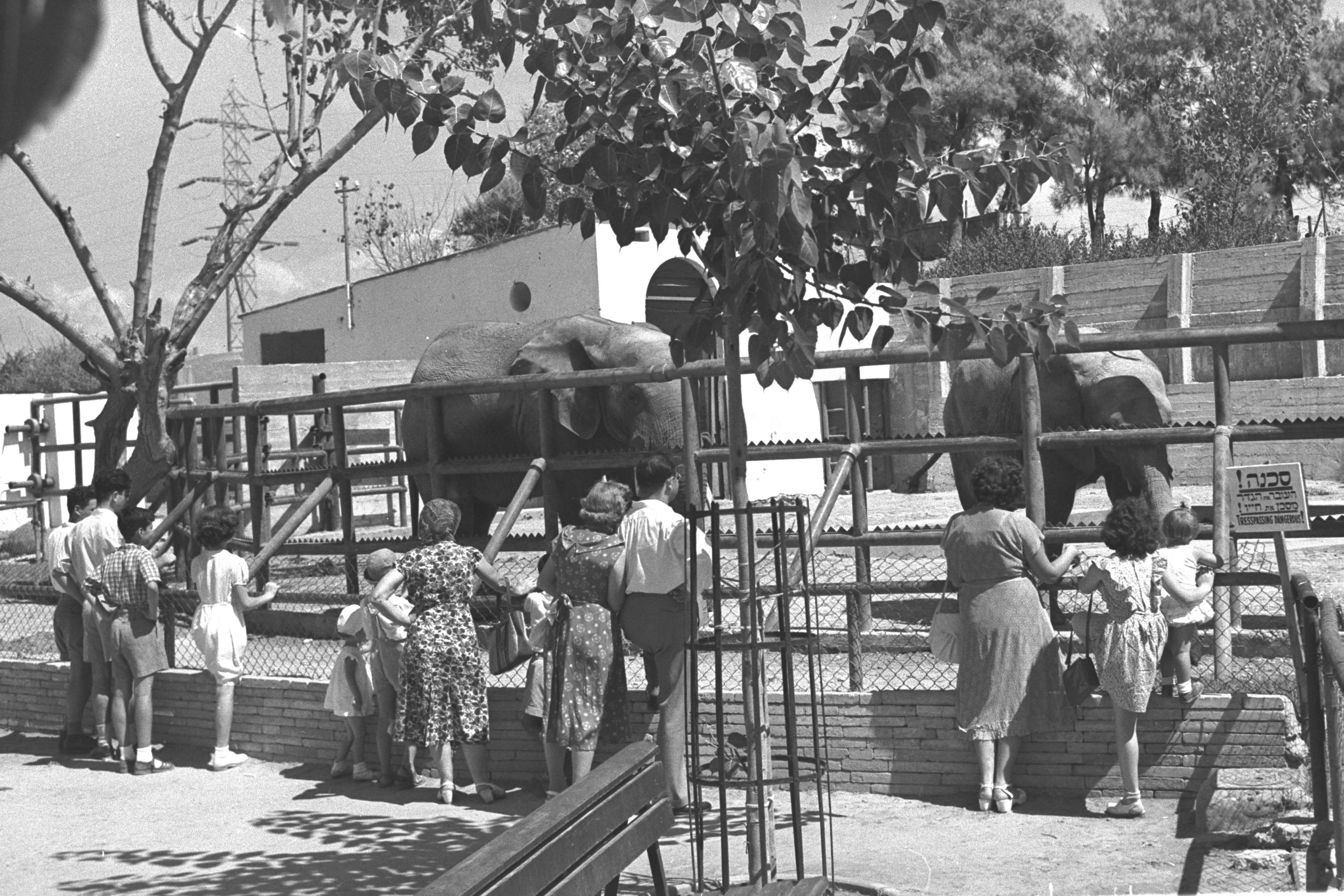
- Elephants in Tel Aviv Zoo, 1950
- Interactive map of Tel Aviv Zoo
- 32°4′56.97″N 34°46′49.74″E
- Date opened: 1938
- Date closed: 1980
- Location: Tel Aviv, Israel

The Tel Aviv Zoo was a zoo founded in 1938 and located in central Tel Aviv. The zoo closed in 1980 and the animals were moved to the Zoological Center of Tel Aviv-Ramat Gan. The Gan Ha'Ir shopping mall now occupies the zoo's site.

== History ==
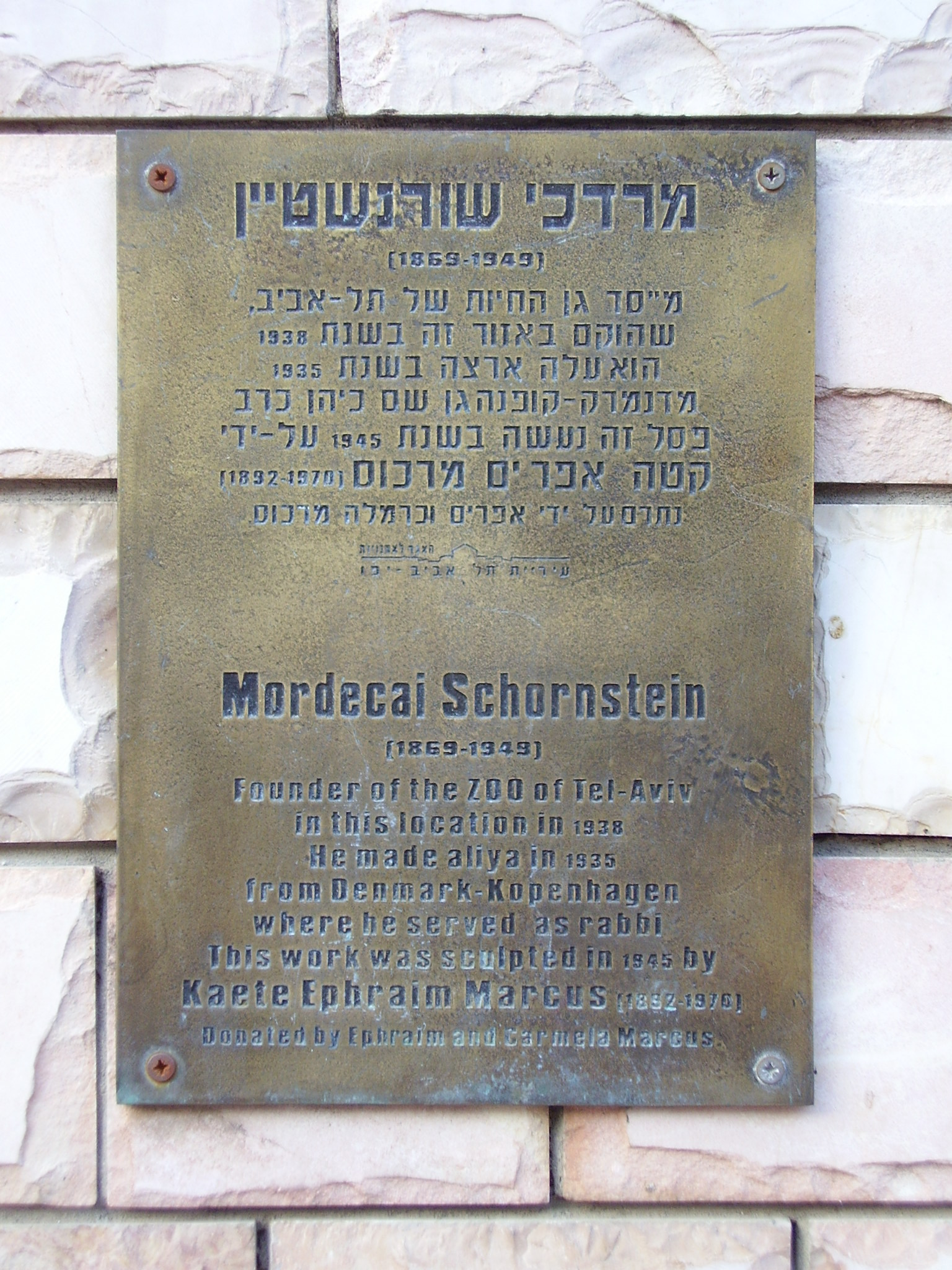
Plaque at Gan Ha'Ir to Mordecai Schornstein, who founded the zoo in 1938

When Rabbi Dr. Mordecai Schornstein arrived in Tel Aviv from Copenhagen in 1935, he had purchased some animals in Italy, and started a pet shop at 15 Shenkin Street which he named ‘Gan Hayot’ (‘zoo’ in Hebrew). In 1938 he started the zoo at 65 Hayarkon Street. After some lions and tigers were donated to the zoo, it caused too much disruption in the neighborhood, and was moved to its location behind city hall in 1939.

In the late 1960s and the 1970s the zoo was one of the few zoos in the world to successfully breed flamingos.

In 1981, the animals were moved out of the city to the Zoological Center of Tel Aviv-Ramat Gan. The Gan Ha'Ir shopping mall now occupies the site of the former zoo. The zoo was home to four elephants when it was closed, two of which were moved to Ramat Gan and two of which were moved elsewhere. Three are still alive as of 2010.
