= Käthe Ephraim Marcus =

Israeli artist (1892-1970)

- קתה אפרים מרקוס
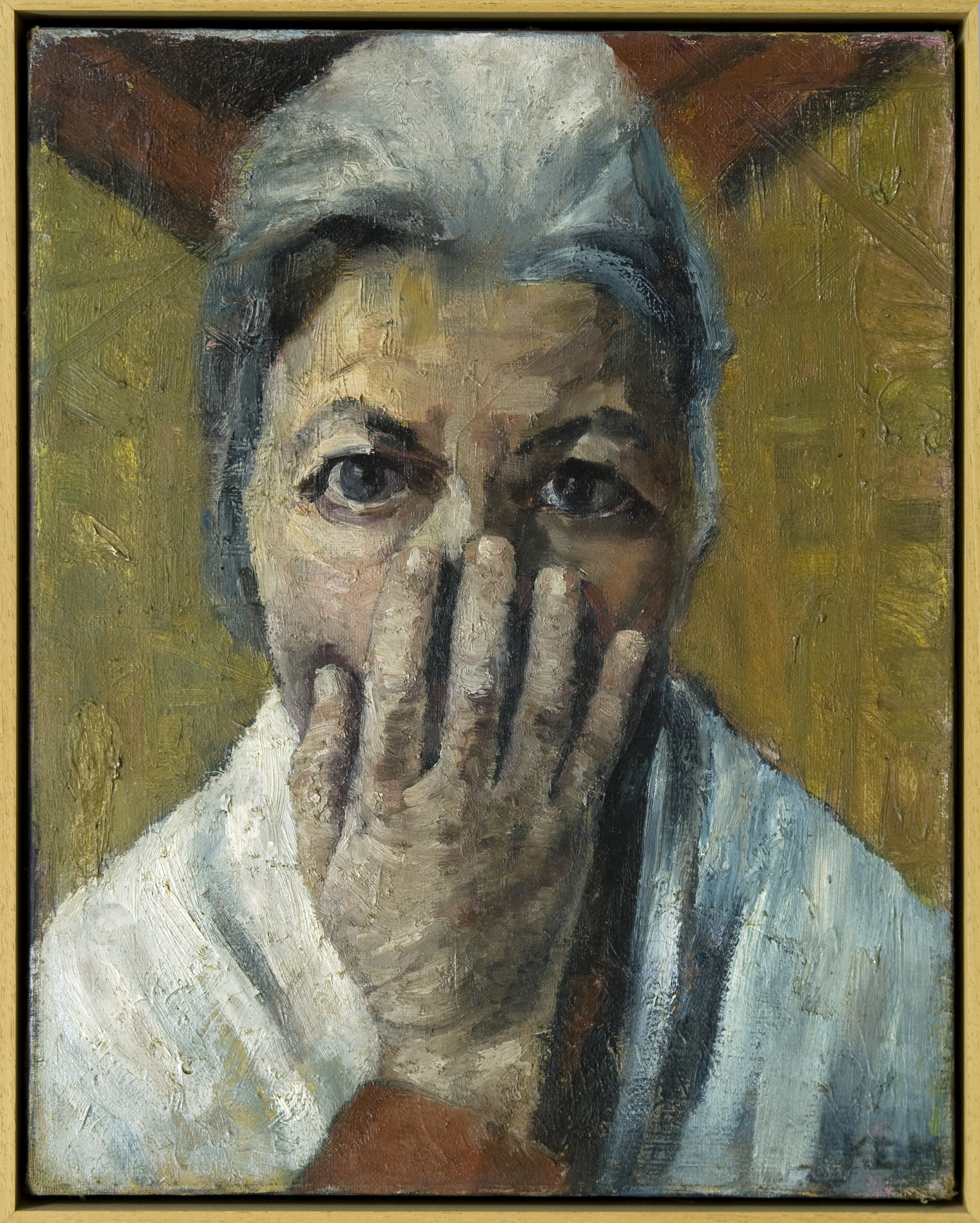
- Käthe Ephraim Marcus, self portrait, unknown date, private collection.
- Born: Käthe Ephraim; 1892; Wrocław, Poland
- Died: 1970 (aged 77–78); Ramat Gan, Israel
- Other names: Kathe or Kaethe, Ephraim-Marcus

Käthe Ephraim Marcus (also Kathe Ephraim-Marcus, Kaethe; née Ephraim; b. 1892, Wrocław – d. 1970, Ramat Gan) was a German-Israeli painter and sculptor.

== Education ==
Marcus studied at art schools in Karlsruhe and Wrocław (then Breslau) between 1911 and 1912. In 1913, she studied with Lovis Corinth and Max Beckmann.

== Biography ==
Her husband Dr. Joseph Marcus (1886-1961) was a senior government official in Breslau and Zionist organizer. The couple likely met through the hiking group and youth movement "Blau Weiss" in Breslau. They married in 1917. In 1934, she and Joseph emigrated to Palestine after spending 1933 in England. She died in 1970 in Ramat Gan, Israel.

== Career ==
She met Käthe Kollwitz in 1920 in Berlin and was influenced by her expressionist figuration.

She spent 1925 in Paris at the Académie de la Grande Chaumiere and in the studio of André Lhote. In 1932, an Austrian-Jewish journal printed an article that described her as most famous for her work for children's books, in which she represented the struggle for a child to understand the world in balanced compositions and harmonies of color.

Marcus was evicted from her studio in Jerusalem in 1947 by the British; much of her early work was destroyed. In 1948, she was evacuated to Ramat Gan.

Marcus was the subject of many solo exhibitions and retrospectives during the 1960s to the 1980s. Her art also appeared in large group exhibitions that defined Israeli art in major museums in Tel Aviv and Jerusalem. Marcus's paintings have become part of the canon of Israeli art, and, in particular, of Israeli feminist art. Her art is characterized, in the words of one reviewer, "an atmosphere of melancholy, loneliness and alienation. She often painted subjects of mothers and children, bewildered and lonely women in hostile environments, new immigrants and transit camps."

In 1961, she published a book titled Out of My Life.
