= Bent Melchior =

Danish rabbi (1929–2021)

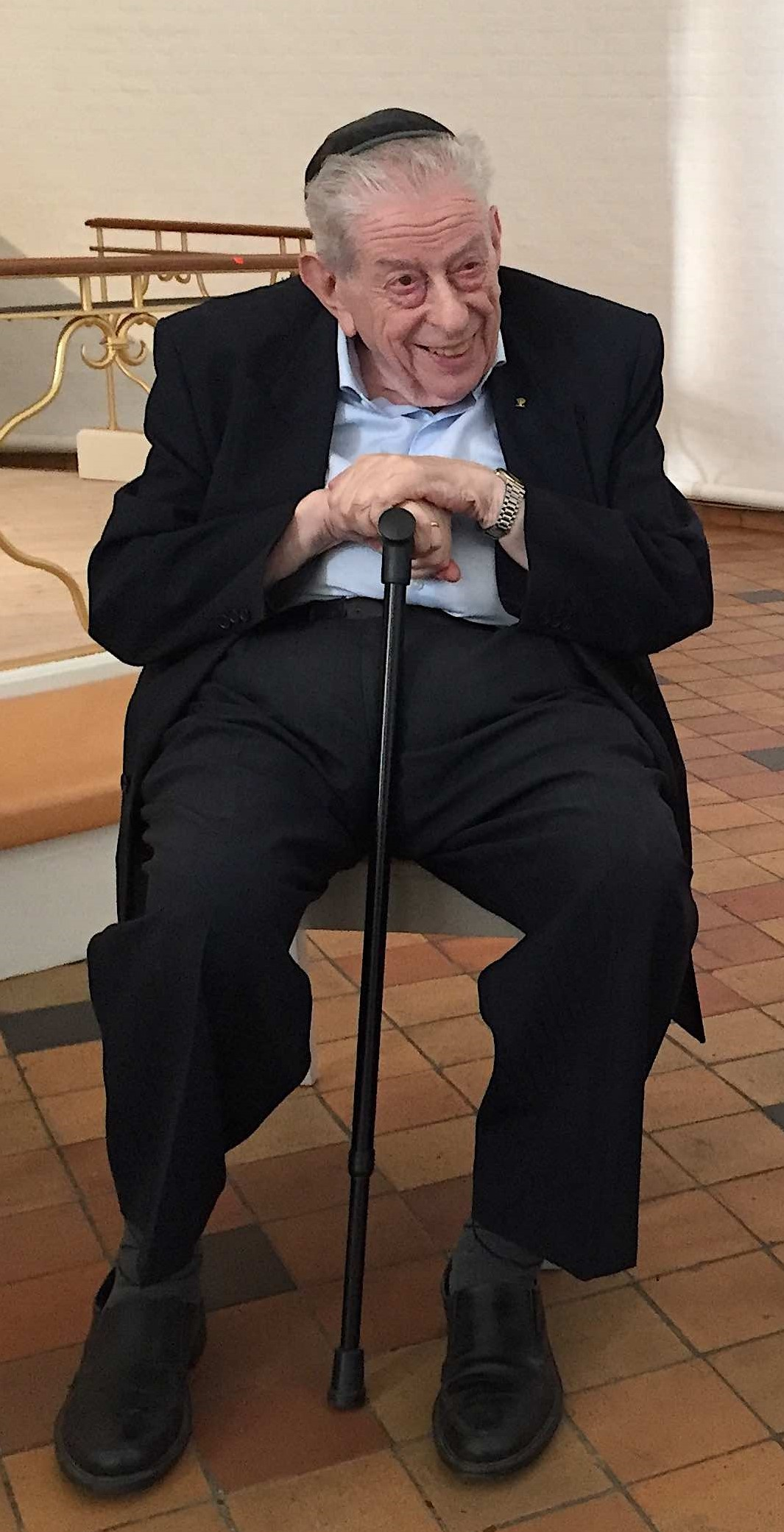
Bent Melchior

Bent Melchior (24 June 1929 – 28 July 2021) was a chief rabbi of Denmark.

== Life and career ==
Melchior was born to Danish parents in Beuthen, Germany (now Bytom, Poland), where his father, Marcus Melchior, was rabbi. In 1943, during the Nazi occupation of Denmark, Marcus Melchior was instrumental in saving Danish Jews, and became chief rabbi of Denmark in 1947. From October 1943 to mid-1945, Melchior and his family lived as refugees in Sweden. Melchior served as a soldier in the 1947–1949 Palestine war, beginning in pre-statehood battles in 1947. Subsequently, at the age of 21, he received a Ph.D. from Copenhagen University.

After a period as a teacher in Copenhagen, Melchior had his rabbinical education in London. In 1963, he became rabbi at the synagogue in Copenhagen. When his father died in 1969, he succeeded him as chief rabbi. He translated the Torah, the siddur (Jewish prayer book), and other books into Danish, as well as writing several books, including his autobiography. He was a prolific speaker and writer in the Danish community and media.

Melchior retired from the rabbinate in 1996. His successor was Bent Lexner. Melchior continued his humanitarian and charitable work in Denmark and abroad in retirement.

== Personal life ==
Bent Melchior married Lilian Weissdorf in 1951. The couple had four sons, including Michael Melchior. His grandson Jair Melchior is currently the chief rabbi of Denmark.
