= Arne Melchior =

Danish politician

Arne Melchior (22 October 1924 – 24 September 2016) was a Danish politician. The son of Marcus Melchior, he was Jewish and a supporter of Jewish causes.

Melchior was active in the Social Democratic Party but left this party in 1973 to co-found the Centre Democrats.

He was member of the Danish Parliament 1973-75 and again 1977–2001. He was minister of traffic in the Conservative Poul Schlüter coalition government 1982–86, and Minister for Communication and Tourism in the Social Democratic Poul Nyrup Rasmussen coalition government 1993–94.

He represented his party in parliament's Foreign Policy Committee 1994–2001, when he was forced to step down after having publicly defended Israel's use of moderate physical coercion on terror suspects. He later chose to leave the Centre Democratic Parliamentary group. The Centre Democrats lost their representation in parliament in the parliamentary election of 2001. The party was dissolved on 1 February 2008.

Melchior died on 24 September 2016, aged 91.

== Others ==
1975–79, Melchior headed the Danish Zionist Federation.

Political offices
Preceded by Jens Kristian Hansen	Traffic Minister of Denmark; 10 September 1982 – 14 August 1986	Succeeded by Frode Nør Christensen
Preceded by Office created	Minister for Communication and Tourism of Denmark; 25 January 1993 – 28 January 1994	Succeeded by Helge Mortensen
