= Disability in Denmark =

As of 2011, 15.1% of people in Denmark had a basic activity disability, and 16.9% had an employment disability.

== Policy and legislation ==
Denmark signed the United Nations Convention on the Rights of Persons with Disabilities and the Optional Protocol in December 2006 and ratified it in July 2009.

== Employment ==
Denmark operates an inclusive labour market through a series of employability programmes aimed at integrating people with disabilities into the workplace. The flex Job scheme was introduced in 1998 to bridge the gap in employment of disabled people by allowing employers to hire those with a reduced work ability at a rate which is then subsidised by the government in order to meet the minimum wage. The Flex Job scheme along with other programmes such as the 'ice breaker' scheme and the Skaane job scheme have been seen as having a positive impact on the Danish labour market as participation by those with disabilities has increased greatly since 1998.

Unlike many of its European counterparts, Denmark does not use a quota system for employing disabled people because it is viewed as placing disabled people in a special category, and instead favours an inclusive and active labour market approach. Denmark's disability employment rate is higher than the OECD average, with 52% of disabled people in employment. However, the number of people in receipt of disability pensions remains high. The number of disabled people living in poverty in Denmark is also above the OECD average at 24.8%.

== Activism ==
Danske Handicaporganisationer [da] advocates for people with disabilities in Denmark.

== Disability culture ==
=== Arts ===
The Sølund Music Festival [da] is a Danish music festival designed for people with disabilities.
