= Danish pre-school education =

Level of education in Denmark

Pre-school Education in Denmark is voluntary and takes place in different types of schools or day care centres covering the time before children enter compulsory education. Today, preschool is where most children enter the Danish education system.

== Historical overview ==
The first pre-schools in Denmark were established in the 1820s by a private initiative intended to instruct the children of working families, where both parents worked outside the home. During the period between 1850 and 1900, private educational institutions appeared that were open only on a part-time basis. These institutions had pedagogical objectives unlike those of the previous schools that were mostly mere retention centres for children of working parents, and were aimed at the children of the more privileged classes.

The social reform of 1933 made it possible for these institutions to receive up to 50 percent of their operational expenditure from the state. From that point on, the state and the municipalities have gradually obtained the biggest financial and pedagogical responsibility for the administration of these institutions. Financial support was also made available in 1949 for institutions that had not been entitled to it before, as they did not meet the conditions of the act to the effect that they catered to children from disadvantaged families. The pedagogical objective of the institutions was thus recognised.

An act in 1964 obliged the authorities to make all public services available to all citizens. The right to pre-school education was also emphasised in the Social Assistance Act of 1976, which demanded that the municipalities create the necessary infrastructure to meet the needs of families.

In 1987, the state delegated responsibility for the financial administration of the pre-school institutions to municipalities.

== Types of institutions ==
75% of established day-care institutions are municipal day-care centres while the other fourth are privately owned and are run by associations, parents, or businesses in agreement with local authorities. In terms of both finances and subject-matter, municipal and private institutions function according to the same principles. In 2007 96% of all children aged 3–5 years and about 90% of the children aged 1–2 years attended a day-care institution.

Pre-school education is primarily offered in the following institutions:

- Nurseries (Danish: vuggestuer), literally 'cradle halls') for children between six months and three years of age. Size: 30 to 60 children;
- Kindergartens (Danish: børnehaver) for children between three and six to seven years of age. Size: 20 to 80 children;
- Integrated institutions for groups with a wider age-group distribution than the two other types. Size: 40 to 150 children;
- Municipal child-care facilities established by private individuals taking in a few children (Danish: dagpleje). Size: 4 to 5 children.
- Pre-school classes (Danish: børnehaveklasser, literally 'kindergarten classes') established at primary schools and catering for children from the age of five to six as the first year of compulsory education (cf. US Kindergarten, English Reception). Average size: 19.7 children (1999)

== Admission requirements ==
In theory, the only admission requirement to this type of institution is age, so that the minimum age to attend a nursery is six months, kindergartens three years, integrated institutions one year, and pre-school five to six years. However, as there are more parents requesting space in the first three types of institutions than there is space, municipalities distribute places taking into consideration the following categories of children:

- Children with special pedagogical or social needs
- Children of one-parent families
- Children sent by another authority
- Children of parents working away from the home
- Children whose brothers or sisters are already enrolled in the institution

== General objectives ==
The Social Service Act stipulates that pre-school facilities shall form part of the total plan for general and preventive measures for children. It is the general objective to create, in co-operation with the parents, a framework which favours the development, well-being, and independence of children. These measures must ensure children have a normal day that at the same time give them security and challenges, and where close links with adults can develop. Furthermore, according to the Act on the Folkeskole, its aim is to familiarise children with the daily routines of school life.

The work of the day care centres are carried out by pedagogues rather than teachers. They are usually assisted by untrained assistants. The pedagogues tend to use a recognising approach where the child is appreciated as a human being.

There is a large focus on learning social skills, motor skills, cultural norms etc. rather than traditional school work such as learning how to read and write. Leading researchers argue to that these factors are one of the reasons why Danish people are the happiest in the world.

== Curriculum, subjects, number of hours ==
In principle, pre-school teachers are free to choose content, working methods, didactical material, and so forth. However, a municipality may draw up an educational plan, and the boards may define the principles of the activities an institution. Teaching takes the form of play and other development-based activities. There are no formalised classes or lessons. In fact, the earlier stages of Danish pre-school education mostly have the character of childcare rather than formal education.

There is no educational plan for the activities in pre-school classes, but school authorities may propose guidelines for the content of the activities. The weekly minimum number of lessons in pre-school is 20 lessons divided into three to four hours a day, five days a week.

== Evaluation ==
There are no formalised rules regarding observation and monitoring, but many educators have an interest in working with interaction-based observation. It is common for an institution to hold parent consultations, where the staff of the institution discuss with individual children's parents how children thrive in the institution, what they occupy themselves with, their strong and weak points, and about their social relationship with other children.
