= History of the Jews in Denmark =

Danish Jews Danske jøder יהודים דניים
Total population
- 6,400

Regions with significant populations
- Copenhagen

Languages
- Danish, Hebrew, Yiddish

Religion
- Judaism, Atheism

The location of Denmark (dark green) in Europe (with possessions Greenland and Faroe Islands)

Census results
Year	Jews	Population	%
1787	1,830	841,806	0.2%
1840	3,839	1,289,075	0.3%
1850	3,941	1,414,648	0.3%
1860	4,214	1,608,362	0.3%
1870	4,290	1,784,741	0.2%
1880	3,946	1,969,039	0.2%
1890	4,080	2,138,529	0.2%
1901	3,476	2,449,540	0.1%
1911	5,164	2,757,076	0.2%
1921	5,947	3,267,831	0.2%

The history of Jews in Denmark goes back to the 1600s. Although there were very likely Jewish merchants, sailors, and others who entered Denmark during the Middle Ages, no efforts were made to establish a Jewish community. At present, the Jewish community in Denmark comprises about 6,000 persons.

The community's population peaked prior to the Holocaust at which time the Danish resistance movement (with the assistance of many ordinary Danish citizens) took part in a collective effort to evacuate about 8,000 Jews and their families from Denmark by sea to nearby neutral Sweden, an act which ensured the safety of almost all the Danish Jews.

== Origins ==
Medieval Danish art contains depictions of Jews—visibly wearing pointed hats—but there is no evidence that any Jews actually lived in Denmark during that time. With the conclusion of the Danish Reformation in 1536, Jews along with Catholics were prohibited entry into Denmark.

The first known settlement on Danish territory was based on a royal dispensation. Industrious Christian IV founded Glückstadt on the river Elbe in today's German state of Schleswig-Holstein in 1616. When it initially threatened to founder, he decided in 1619 to allow Jewish merchant Albert Dionis to settle in the town. He thus hoped to ensure its success. This dispensation was extended to a few other Jews, and in 1628, their status was formalized by being promised protection, the right to hold private religious services, and maintain their own cemetery. Albert Dionis gained special status within the Danish royal court, apparently as a source of credit for ambitious projects. Gabriel Gomez, who also attained status, persuaded Frederik III to allow Sephardic Jews to reside in Denmark while conducting trade. At that time, Ashkenazi Jews, in contrast to the Sephardim, were forbidden to enter unless they were specifically granted letters of safe passage, and were subject to considerable fines if caught without the required documents; nevertheless, many of the Jews who settled in the kingdom in the coming years were Ashkenazi.

== Establishment of permanent communities ==
Following the costly Thirty Years' War, which created a fiscal crisis for the Danish crown, Frederik III proclaimed absolute monarchy in Denmark. To improve trade, the king encouraged Jewish immigration. The first Jewish community was founded in the newly established town of Fredericia in 1682, and in 1684 an Ashkenazi community was founded in Copenhagen.

By 1780, there were approximately 1,600 Jews in Denmark, though all were admitted by special permission granted only on the basis of personal wealth. They were subject to social and economic discrimination, and for a brief period in 1782 they were forced to attend Lutheran services. But they were not required to live in ghettos and had a significant degree of self-governance.

== Danish West Indies ==
Jews began settling in the Danish West Indies in 1655, and by 1796 the first synagogue was inaugurated. In its heyday in the mid-19th century, the Jewish community made up half of the non-Black population. One of the earliest colonial governors, Gabriel Milan, was a Sephardic Jew.

== Integration into Danish life ==
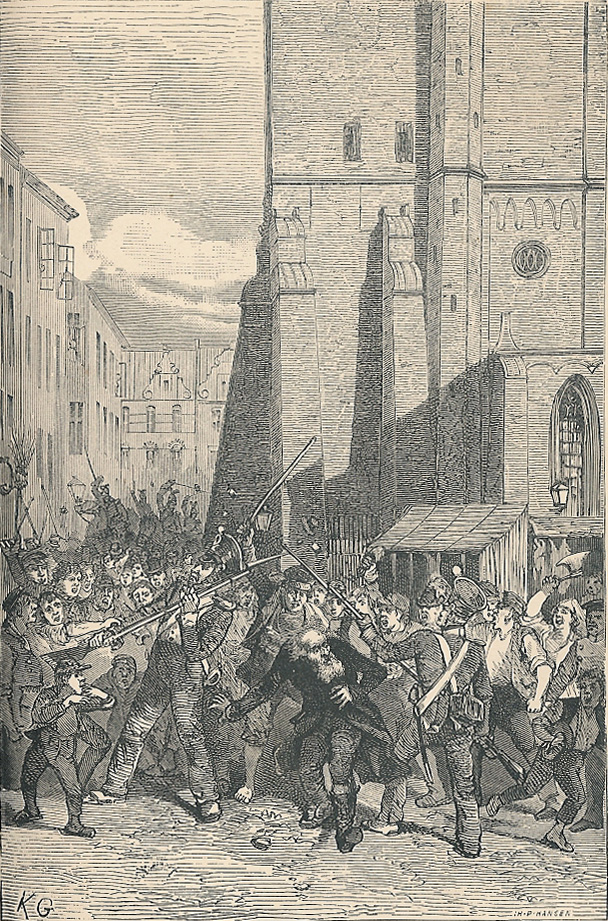
The anti-Jewish riots in Copenhagen in September 1819

As the Jewish enlightenment reached Denmark in the late 18th century, the king instituted a number of reforms to facilitate integration of Jewish subjects into the larger Danish society. Jews were allowed to join guilds, study at the university, buy real estate, and establish schools.

The Napoleonic Wars and the disastrous Gunboat War brought about a complete emancipation of Danish Jews (while, in contrast, events in Norway resulted in a constitutional ban on Jews entering Norway). Still, there were severe antisemitic riots in Denmark in 1819 that lasted several months, though without any known fatalities.

On the other hand, the early 19th century saw a flourishing of Danish-Jewish cultural life. The Great Synagogue of Copenhagen is a landmark building, designed by the architect G. F. Hetsch. A number of Jewish cultural personalities (or persons of Jewish ancestry who did not necessarily regard themselves as Jews), among them the art benefactor and editor Mendel Levin Nathanson, the writer Meir Aron Goldschmidt, and founder of Politiken, Edvard Brandes, his brother literary critic Georg Brandes (who had a strong influence on Norwegian playwright Henrik Ibsen), Henri Nathansen, and others rose to prominence.

== Growth and 20th century crises ==
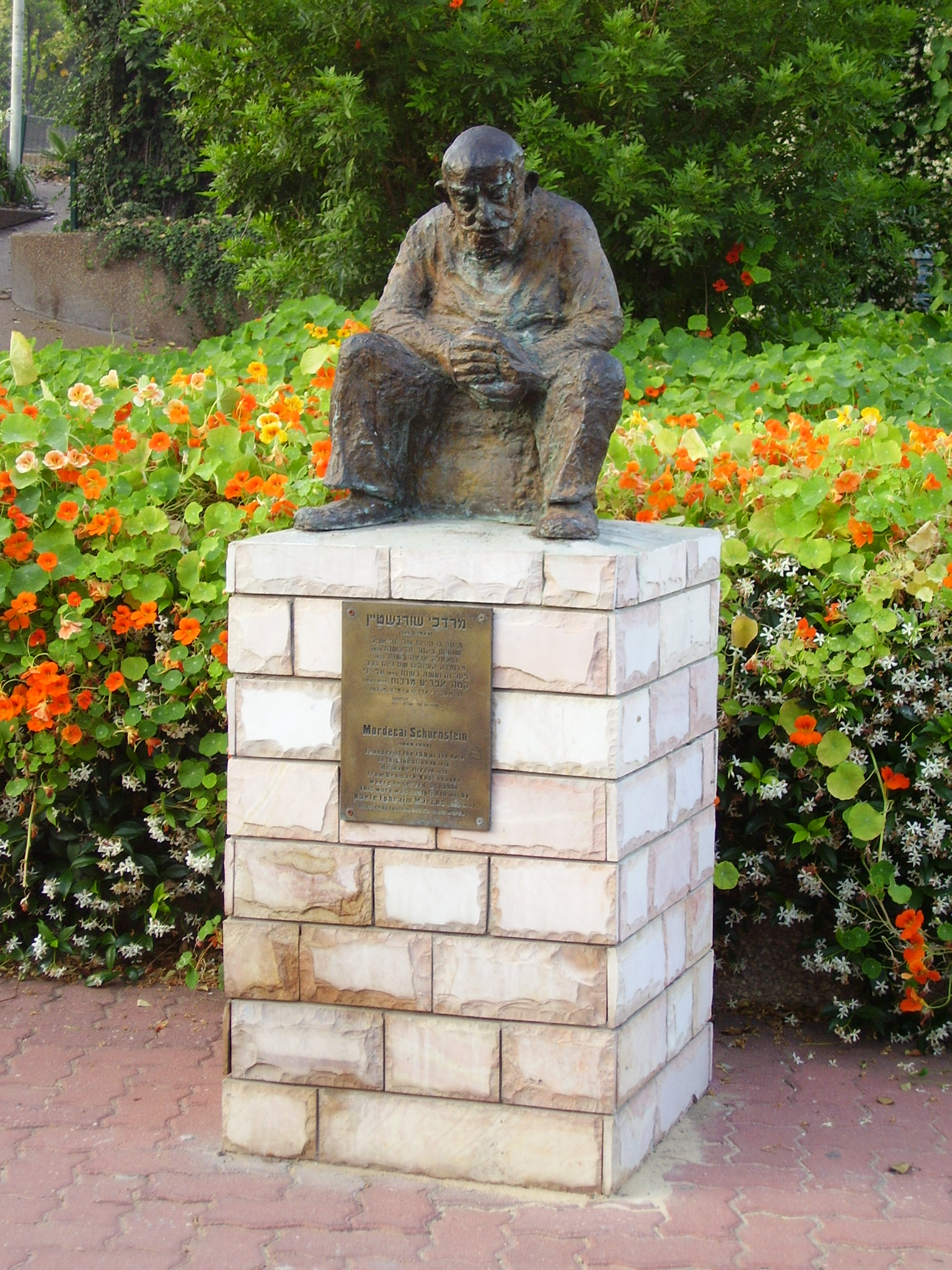
Sculpture of Rabbi Mordecai Schornstein at the former site of the Tel Aviv Zoo.

As in many other societies, increasing integration accelerated assimilation of Jews into mainstream Danish society, including higher rates of intermarriage. In the early twentieth century, events such as the Kishinev pogrom in 1903, the Russo-Japanese War in 1904, and the series of Russian revolutions, led to an influx of approximately 3,000 Jewish refugees into Denmark.

The new arrivals changed the character of Danish Jewry significantly. More likely to be socialist Bundists than religious, they founded a Yiddish theater and several Yiddish newspapers. During World War I, in 1918, the World Zionist Organization set up a central office in Copenhagen in order to present the claims of the Jewish people at the Paris peace conference. These proved to be short-lived, however, and Denmark closed its door to further immigration in the early 1920s.

A notable Danish Jew from this period was Rabbi Dr. Mordecai Schornstein, one of the Chief Rabbis of Copenhagen, who, after immigrating to Mandatory Palestine, founded the Tel Aviv zoo.

== Nazi era ==
In April 1933, Christian X was scheduled to appear at the central synagogue in Copenhagen to celebrate its centennial anniversary. When Adolf Hitler came to power in Germany in January 1933, the community leaders suggested that the king postpone his visit. The king insisted, however, and became the first Nordic monarch to visit a synagogue. Christian X also became the subject of a persistent urban legend according to which, during Nazi occupation, he donned the Star of David in solidarity with the Danish Jews. This is not true, as Danish Jews were not forced to wear the star of David. However, the legend likely stems from a 1942 British report that claimed he threatened to don the star if this was forced upon Danish Jews. He did, however, later on, finance the transport of Danish Jews to unoccupied Sweden, where they would be safe from Nazi persecution. A period of tension ensued, for the Danish population in general and its Jewish citizens in particular. Danish policy sought to ensure its independence and neutrality by placating the neighboring Nazi regime. After Denmark was occupied by Germany following Operation Weserübung on April 9, 1940, the situation became increasingly precarious.

In 1943, the situation came to a head when Werner Best, the German plenipotentiary in Denmark, ordered the arrest and deportation of all Danish Jews, scheduled to commence on October 1, which coincided with Rosh Hashanah. The Jewish Danes were warned and only 202 were arrested initially. 7,550 fled to Sweden, ferried across the Øresund strait; 500 Jews were deported to the Theresienstadt concentration camp. Danish authorities often interceded on their behalf (as they did for other Danes in German custody), sending food. Of the 500 Jews who were captured, approximately 50 died during deportation. Danes rescued the rest and they returned to Denmark in what was regarded as a patriotic duty against the Nazi occupation. Many non-Jewish Danes protected their Jewish neighbours' property and homes while they were gone. After the war, many Danish Jews migrated to Sweden, Israel, the United Kingdom, and the United States.

== Post-war era ==
According to Finn Schwarz, president of the Jewish Community in Denmark, the religious organization had approximately 1900 members in 2013. Compared to 1997, this number indicates a significant decrease in membership, which the Jewish community has explained partly by increasing antisemitic incidents. Research from Danish professor Peter Nannestad has shown that antisemitism in Denmark is confined to minority groups and is not an issue in Danish society at large. Rather, the fact that Denmark has become increasingly secular in recent years might be a better explanation for why Jews and other groups with a strong religious heritage face difficulties in adapting to life in Denmark. Indeed, it has been suggested that non-Orthodox Jews have little or no problems feeling at home in Denmark. According to the Jewish Community in Denmark, as of 2020, there were approximately 6,000 Jews in Denmark, of which 1,700 were card-carrying members of the organisation. Most Danish Jews are secular but maintain a cultural connection to Jewish life. Almost all Jews are integrated into mainstream Danish society.

Danish society has generally maintained a safe and friendly environment for its Jewish minority. There are three active synagogues in Denmark today, all in Copenhagen. The larger synagogue on Krystalgade is a Modern Orthodox-Conservative community and inclusive of its members' affiliations, though it follows a traditional liturgy. The Machsike Hadas Synagogue is an Orthodox synagogue, and Chabad also has a presence in Copenhagen. Shir Hatzafon is a Reform Jewish synagogue and community in Denmark.

In addition, two Jewish periodicals are published in Danish: Rambam, published by Selskabet for Dansk-Jødisk Historie, and Alef, a journal of Jewish culture.

=== Contemporary antisemitism ===
As of 2012, tolerance toward the Jewish population in Denmark has become more tenuous due to increasing anti-Zionist sentiment and anti-Jewish hostility.

In February 2014, the AKVAH (Section for Mapping and Sharing of Knowledge about antisemitic Incidents) published its Report on Antisemitic Incidents in Denmark 2013. The report described 43 antisemitic incidents that occurred in Denmark during the year, which included assault and physical harassment, threats, antisemitic utterances, and vandalism. According to the report, there was no change in the level of antisemitism in the country compared to previous years.

The Jewish community in Denmark reported an increase in threatening messages and antisemitic assaults caused by the 2014 Israel–Gaza conflict.

In August 2014, the "Carolineskolen", a Jewish school, kindergarten and daycare complex in Copenhagen, was vandalized as windows were smashed and antisemitic graffiti was sprayed on the school walls. The graffiti was political in nature and referred to the ongoing conflict between Israel and Hamas in Gaza. Prior to this event, school officials advised parents not to allow their children to wear Jewish religious symbols in public as a result of rising reports of antisemitic harassment in Denmark. The Jewish community in Denmark reported 29 incidents in connection with the conflict in Gaza.

In September 2014, a Danish imam, Mohamad Al-Khaled Samha, at a mosque run by The Islamic Society in Denmark, said in a filmed lecture that the Jews are the "offspring of apes and pigs". In July 2014 Al-Khaled had stated "Oh Allah, destroy the Zionist Jews. They are no challenge for you. Count them and kill them to the very last one. Don't spare a single one of them."

On 15 February 2015, a shooting occurred outside the main synagogue in Copenhagen, and killed a Jewish man (who had been providing security during a bat mitzvah) and injured two police officers. Prime Minister Helle Thorning-Schmidt laid flowers at the synagogue, and stated "Our thoughts go to the whole of the Jewish community today. They belong in Denmark, they are a strong part of our community. And we will do everything we can to protect the Jewish community in our country." The synagogue's Rabbi, Jair Melchior, stated, "Terror is not a reason to move to Israel... Hopefully the [police] should do what they do, but our lives have to continue naturally. Terror's goal is to change our lives and we won't let it...We lost a dear member of the community and now we have to continue doing what he did, which was helping to continue regular Jewish lives in Denmark. This is the real answer to [this] vicious, cruel and cowardly act of terror." Two months later, a window at a local Kosher-food store was smashed and an anti-Semitic graffiti was scrawled on a wall.

A review study published in 2015 by the Institute for the Study of Global Antisemitism and Policy revealed that in a survey conducted in Denmark, the number of antisemitic stereotypes among immigrants of Turkish, Pakistani, Somali, Palestinian and (former) Yugoslav origin were significantly more common (up to 75 percent) than among ethnic Danes (up to 20 percent). The survey, managed by the Institute for Political Science at Aarhus University, consisted of interviews with 1,503 immigrants and 300 ethnic Danes.

In the Kundby case a Danish teenager became an enthusiast admirer of ISIS, Islamism, and Jihad, converted to Islam, and was convicted of acquiring bomb-making materials for her plan to blow up a Jewish school in Copenhagen.

In September 2017, soldiers from the Royal Danish Army were deployed to guard synagogues in Copenhagen to relieve the Police of Denmark, which was increasingly occupied with gang-related shootings in the city.

In February 2024, The Associated Press reported that the number of antisemitic incidents in Denmark "reached levels not seen since World War II," according to Henri Goldstein, the leader of the country's Jewish community; Goldstein cited reactions to the Gaza war as the cause of this growing antisemitism.

According to a report published by the Danish Jewish Community’s Department for Mapping and Registering Antisemitic Incidents in the beginning of May 2026, in 2025, 199 antisemitic incidents were registered in the country, 24 of which were against Jewish children and young people. The total is the second-highest figure since monitoring started in 2012. According to Rosen, chairperson of the Jewish Community, "Unfortunately, antisemitism in Denmark is not retreating. It has become normalised at an unprecedented level."

== Jews in Greenland ==
Despite there being no permanent Jewish community in Greenland, Jews have visited the island since the 17th century. Members of the Israeli navy, American army, and Israeli Air Force have been known to be in the Pituffik Space Base, formally known as the Thule Air Base, and in the 1950s the world's most northern minyan happened there.

== See also ==
- History of the Jews in Finland
- History of the Jews in Iceland
- History of the Jews in Norway
- History of the Jews in Sweden
- History of the Jews in Greenland
