= Israelite Seminary of France =

Rabbinical school in France

The Israelite Seminary of France (French: Le séminaire israélite de France (SIF)) also known as the Central Rabbinical School of France (L'école centrale rabbinique de France), is a Rabbinical school that trains Orthodox rabbis in France. Founded in Metz in 1829 as the Central Rabbinical School of Metz, it moved to Paris in 1859, where it is based in the city's 5th arrondissement. The school is connected with the Israelite Central Consistory of France, one of the major bodies of Orthodox Judaism in France.

== History ==
In 1820, discussions began over the creation of a rabbinical school in France. On August 21, 1829, a seminary was requested by the Central Consistory and granted by ministerial order. The buildings were inaugurated on June 1, 1830 at 47 Rue d'Arsenal in Metz. Metz was at that point an important center of the Jewish community. On March 22, 1831, an order of King Louis Philippe I allowed for state financing for the school.

On July 1, 1859, the school moved to Paris after a royal decree by Empress Eugenie. It took the name Séminaire israélite. It was temporarily set up at the Derenbourg-Springer Institution at 10 Rue de Parc-Royal in the 3e arrondissement of Paris, and later at 57 Boulevard Richard-Lenoir in the 11e arrondissement.

The Consistory bought 1500 square meters of land at 9 Rue Vauquelin in the Latin Quarter of the 5e arrondissement, the center of French intellectual life. David Bloqué, an Alsatian living in Paris, gave a generous donation to the school. The student-rabbis moved to the Latin Quarter location on April 11, 1881. An oratory was inaugurated during Rosh Hashanah 1883.

The 1905 law on the separation of Church and State ended the state's financial contribution to the school. The school kept the name Séminaire israélite de France (SIF), while the rabbinical school also became known as the l’École rabbinique de France.

During the Second World War, the seminary moved to Vichy France for a few months in 1940. From 1941 to July 1942, it was located in Chamalières, near Clermont-Ferrand. In October 1942, it moved to Lyon. The school was dissolved in 1943 and functioned underground until 1945. After the Liberation of France, it resumed its activities.

== Mission ==
Since its founding in 1830, the seminary has had over 400 students, with over 300 graduating with a diploma. Its primary goal is to produce rabbis, though for many years some graduates have become chanters or Hazzanim. Of the nineteen Chief Rabbis of France (including interim) since the creation of the role, the last nine Chief Rabbis were ordained by the Seminary.

The Seminary library specializes in the Bible, the Talmud, Halacha, Rabbinic literature, Talmudic law, homilies, and in the history and sociology of Judaism. It is a part of the European Network of Libraries of Judaica and Hebraica, which they founded in July 2004 with the library of the Alliance Israélite Universelle and the Medem Library, House of Yiddish Culture. The network is associated with the Bibliothèque nationale de France.

== Directors ==
- 1830–1837 : Lion Mayer (Judah Meir) Lambert
- 1837–1856 : Mayer Lazard
- 1856–1890 : Isaac Léon Trenel
- 1890–1917 : Joseph Lehmann,
- 1919–1931 : Jules Bauer
- 1932–1949 : Maurice Liber
- 1949–1951 : Ernest Gugenheim, interim director
- 1951–1977 : Henri Schilli
- 1977-1977 : Ernest Gugenheim (a few days before his death)
- 1977–1991 : Emmanuel Chouchena
- 1992–2012 : Michel Gugenheim
- 2013– : Olivier Kaufmann

== Notable alumni, professors and administrators ==
- Gilles Bernheim (1952–), Chief Rabbi of France (2009–2013)
- Arsène Darmesteter (1846–1888), student for a short period, later a professor
- Hartwig Derenbourg (1844–1908), professor of Arabic and Semitic languages
- Joseph Derenbourg (1811–1895), Arabist, student and teacher
- Josy Eisenberg (1933–2017), Television producer and Rabbi
- David Feuerwerker (1912–1980), Rabbi of Brive-la-Gaillarde, Chief Rabbi of Lyon, Rabbi of the Rue des Tournelles Synagogue (Paris), the Rue Chasseloup-Laubat Synagogue (Paris), and member of the Beth din and Vaad Haïr of Montréal (Québec, Canada)
- Michel Gugenheim (1950–), Rabbi of Michkenot Israël Synagogue (Paris), Chief Rabbi of Paris, Interim co-Chief Rabbi of France (2013–2014) (with Olivier Kaufmann)
- René Gutman (1950–), Rabbi of Reims, Besançon, Chief Rabbi of Brussels, Chief Rabbi of Strasbourg and the Bas-Rhin
- Paul Janet (1823–1899), Teacher of Philosophy
- Zadoc Kahn (1839–1905), Chief Rabbi de France (1889–1905)
- Haïm Korsia (1963–), Rabbi of Le Mans (for holidays), Rabbi of Reims, Chief Rabbi of France (2014–)
- Mayer Lambert (1863–1930), orientalist
- Emmanuel Levinas (1906–1995), Philosopher, student and teacher
- Alfred Lévy (1840–1919), Chief Rabbi of France (1907–1919)
- Sylvain Lévi (1863–1935), Indologist, student and teacher
- Isidore Loeb (1839–1892), teacher of history and Jewish studies (1878–1890)
- Georges Loinger, (1910–2018), Member of the French Resistance
- Samuel Naumbourg (1817–1880), Teacher of liturgical music
- Isaïe Schwartz (1876–1952), Interim Rabbi of Marseille, Rabbi of Bayonne, Chief Rabbi of Bordeaux, Chief Rabbi of Strasbourg and the Bas-Rhin, Chief Rabbi of France (1939–1952)
- Joseph Sitruk (1944–2016), Rabbi of Strasbourg, Chief Rabbi of Marseille, Chief Rabbi of France (1987–2008)
- Georges Vajda (1908–1981) Historian of medieval Jewish thought, teacher of bible and Jewish theology
- Roger Winsbacher (1928–2012), Rabbi of Saint-Louis (Haut-Rhin), Obernai (Bas-Rhin), and Adath Israel synagogue in Strasbourg

== Bibliography ==
- Jules Bauer, L'École rabbinique de France 1830–1930, PUF, Paris, 1930.
- Roger Berg, Histoire du rabbinat français (XVIe-XXe siècle), collection Patrimoines-Judaïsme, Éditions du Cerf, Paris, 1992, ISBN 2-204-04252-8.
- (in English) Robert K. Wittman et David Kinney. The Devil's Diary. Alfred Rosenberg and the Stolen Secrets of the Third Reich. Harper & Collins, New York, 2016. ISBN 9780062319012
