= Synagogal Judaism =

Branch of Judaism

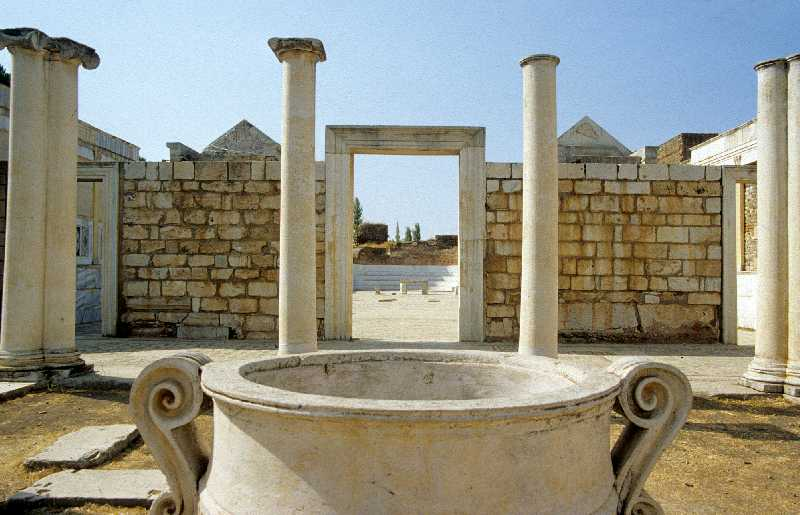
Sardis synagogue, Turkey, 3rd century.

Synagogal Judaism or Synagogal and Sacerdotal Judaism, named by some common Judaism or para-rabbinic Judaism, was a branch of Judaism that emerged around the 2nd century BCE in the wider context of Hellenistic Judaism with the construction of the first synagogues in the Jewish diaspora and ancient Judea. Parallel to Rabbinic Judaism and Jewish Christianity, it developed after the destruction of the Second Temple in Jerusalem in 70 CE.

Also known as "common Judaism" or "para-rabbinic Judaism", the synagogal movement encompassed the rites and traditions predominantly followed by the Judeans in the early centuries of the common era. Within this movement, the religious practices and culture common to the ancient Jewish diaspora were formed. Influenced by the Hellenistic culture and the subsequent Greco-Roman world, and also by Persian culture, it gave rise to a distinct art form in the 3rd century. According to researchers, Jewish priests mostly stayed inside that movement after the destruction of the Second Temple.

Between Rabbinic Judaism and Christianity, there existed another entity, which undoubtedly had more legitimacy due to its antiquity and the fact that it was based more on ethnicity than belief. This entity can be called Synagogal Judaism, which was caught between the identities of the Rabbinic and Christian movements that were forming between the 2nd and 4th centuries. The former gradually disappeared by assimilating into either the Rabbinic movement or the Christian movement, although its reality persisted in certain regions throughout the Middle Ages in both the West and the East.

— Simon Claude Mimouni, Le judaïsme ancien du VIe siècle avant notre ère au IIIe siècle de notre ère: des prêtres aux rabbins

Distinct from Rabbinic Judaism and Jewish Christianity, synagogal Judaism carried a mysticism associated with the hekhalot literature ("literature of the Palaces") and the Targum. It is considered the ultimate source of the Kabbalah according to Moshe Idel.

Synagogal Judaism was called a "triplet brother" of Rabbinic Judaism and Christianity.

== Concept ==
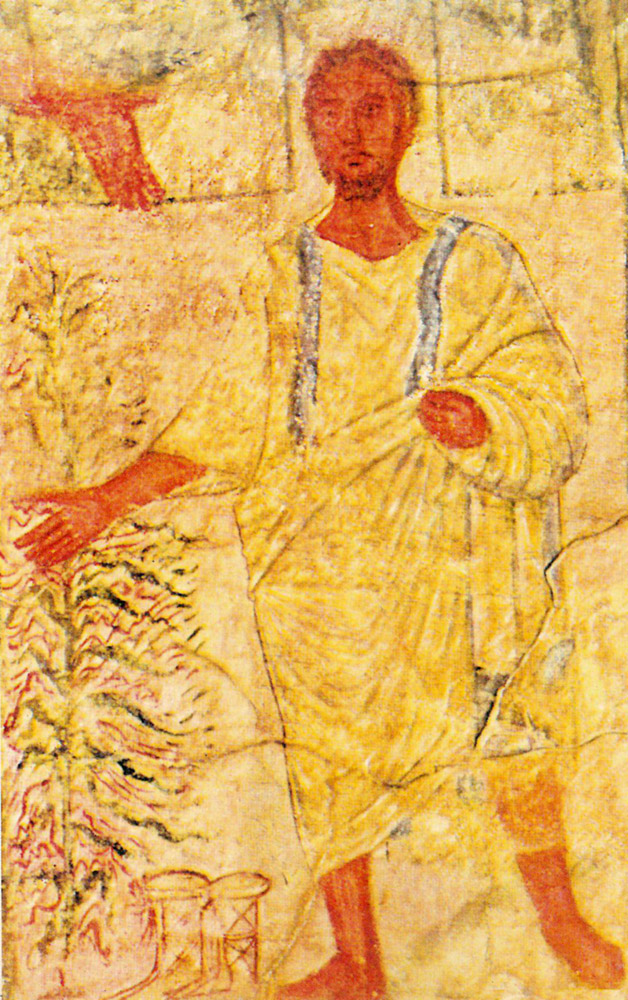
Moses depicted in a fresco from the Dura-Europos synagogue, Syria, mid-3rd century.

Erwin Ramsdell Goodenough proposed a hypothesis that there existed in antiquity a form of Judaism that had fallen into oblivion, influenced particularly by Greek culture. He referred to it as "Hellenistic Judaism", which was distinct from both Rabbinic Judaism and Christianity. He cites the discovery of the ruins of the Dura-Europos synagogue in the 1930s, art historians and historians of religion were confronted with archaeological remains that challenged the commonly accepted historiography of Jewish art. The Dura-Europos synagogue, dating to the mid-3rd century CE, revealed a significant collection of figurative paintings depicting scenes from the narratives of the Tanakh. The excavation of ruins from other ancient synagogues in the following decades yielded comparable iconography that contradicted the prohibitions imposed by contemporary rabbinic academies regarding the creation of images.

The research conducted by Gershom Scholem on the ancient sources of Kabbalah led him to propose a similar hypothesis based on the data provided by texts of ancient Jewish mysticism, particularly associated with the Judeo-Platonic school of Philo of Alexandria in the 1st century.

Goodenough was convinced that his work complemented Scholem's. One, through archaeology, and the other, through texts, attested to the existence of an ancient mystical tradition unknown in the history of Judaism until the emergence of Kabbalah in the 12th century.

Scholem did not make as radical a distinction as Goodenough between mystical Judaism and Rabbinic Judaism. However, they agreed that Greek, Platonic, Gnostic, and Orphic influences played a decisive role in the creation of Jewish mysticism. This viewpoint is contested by Moshe Idel and Charles Mopsik, who believe that "Scholem underestimated the specifically Jewish element in the formation of Kabbalah and exaggerated the influence of Gnosticism."

The historiographical research conducted by scholars such as Daniel Boyarin, Lee I. Levine, and others, introduced two components in ancient Jewish mysticism: a Greek-language component and an Aramaic-language component (the native language of Syria, widely spoken in the ancient Near East). This bilingualism, was characteristic of Judean culture in the early centuries of the common era and is reflected in the Targum literature (Aramaic commentaries on the biblical text), which played an equally important role as the Judeo-Greek literature.

"This Judaism", noted José Costa, "is communal, as it is founded on a common source for all its components: the broad biblical tradition. It is complex in that it gave rise to monumental synagogues in all their diversity [...]. It incorporates both the ethnic and religious components of Jewish identity. Lastly, it allows us to understand how pagan material culture underwent a process of appropriation within a Jewish context." Simon Claude Mimouni prefers to call it "synagogal Judaism", a notion that refers to the same historiographical foundations.

== History ==
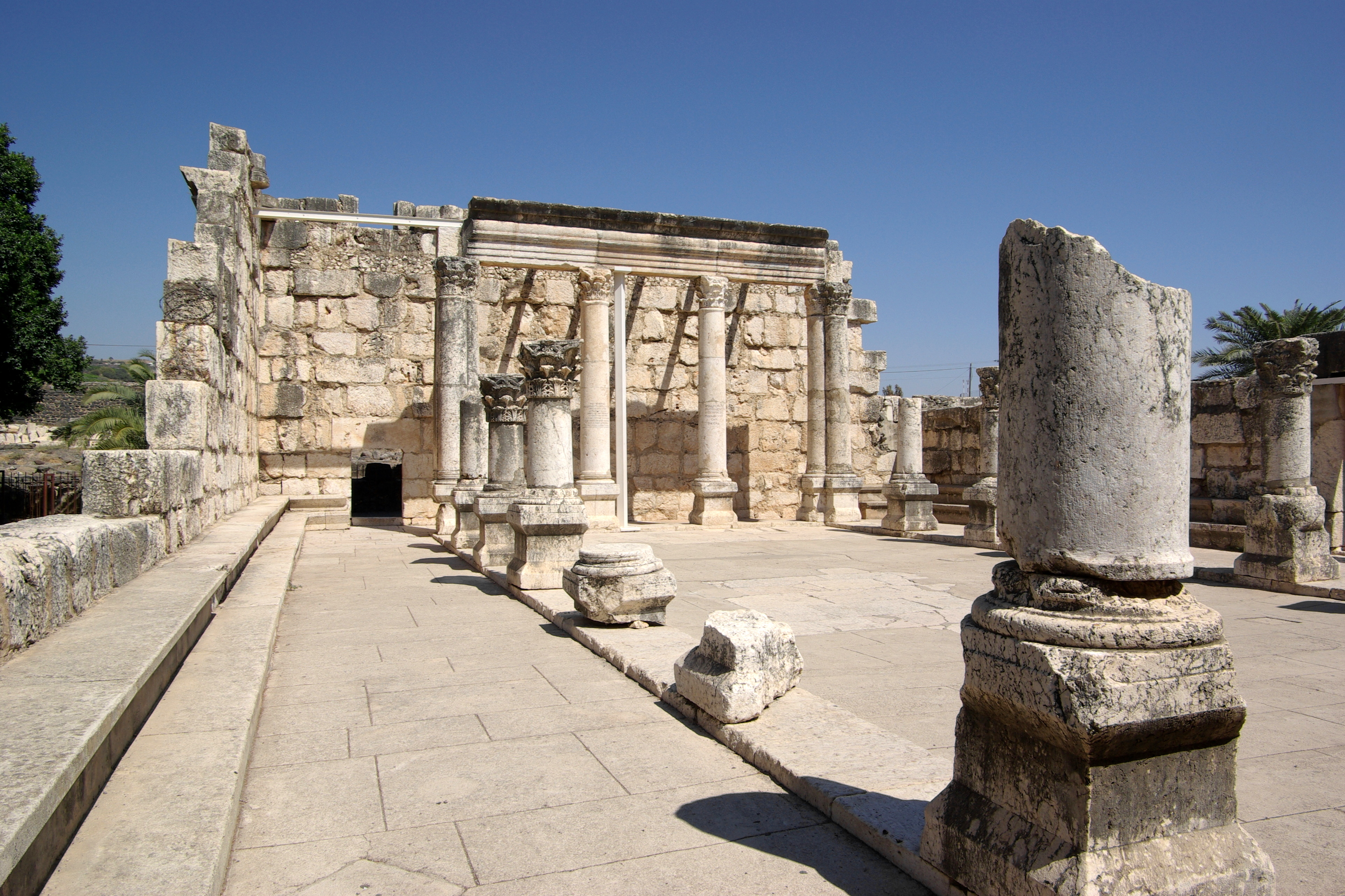
Synagogue of Capernaum, Israel, 2nd century.

The first synagogues (from the Greek "sunagōgē", meaning "assembly") or proseuches (from the Greek "proseuchē," meaning "[place of] prayers") appeared around the 2nd century BCE in the Hellenistic kingdoms of the Eastern Diaspora, such as Egypt, Syria, Asia Minor, and others. According to Lee I. Levine, they were modeled after the Hellenistic concept of associations. Synagogue associations were not fundamentally different from pagan associations in Greco-Roman cities. Consisting of various communities, their mission was to establish a sanctuary and conduct worship, as well as to organize solidarity among their members through charitable practices in particular.

The synagogue movement, which first emerged in the Diaspora, soon spread to the Kingdom of Judah, serving as a link between the Jews within, who focused on the institution of the Temple, and the Jews outside, who centered their religious life around the synagogue. According to Solomon W. Baron, the Jewish population at that time, shortly before the First Jewish Revolt against Rome in 70 CE, reached approximately eight million people (two million in Palestine and six million in the Diaspora, including one million in Persia). This was a significant mass, accounting for nearly one-tenth of the overall population of the Roman Empire. The synagogue movement was crucial in fostering unity among the Jewish people.

The destruction of the Temple in Jerusalem in 70 CE, during the First Jewish Revolt, led to the demise of the priestly Judaism and its replacement by synagogal Judaism. Both the Jews in Palestine and those in the Diaspora "slowly turned towards the rabbinic movement and its alternative of a Judaism without a sanctuary or priesthood, in other words, without cultic worship", as observed by Mimouni. At that time, rabbinic Judaism and Jewish Christianity represented only a minority among the religious Jewish population.

The Bar Kokhba revolt originated within the synagogal movement. After the failure of the revolt, the synagogue movement underwent pagan influences, particularly in Palestine.

Seth Schwartz distinguishes two periods: the first, between 135 and 350 CE, marked by a rise of paganism among the Jews, and the second, between 350 and 640 CE, characterized by a desire to re-Judaize. However, the responsibility for this re-Judaization did not lie with the rabbis, but rather with the decline of paganism in the Roman Empire, associated with the conversion of Emperor Constantine to Christianity.

The synagogue, drawing from its own culture, pushed the Jews to establish connections either with the rabbis or with the Christians, depending on the context. Rabbinic Judaism, which generally held a hostile stance toward the rites practiced in the synagogues, changed its position by incorporating synagogal culture within itself in order to adapt to the convergence of these two streams around the 4th and 5th centuries, according to Schwartz.

However, historians like Mimouni, Boyarin, and Levine find this view too simplistic. Levine, in particular, observes that the rabbis began showing increasing interest in the synagogue from the 2nd century onwards, but they did not hold a dominant position within it until the 5th century.

== Society ==
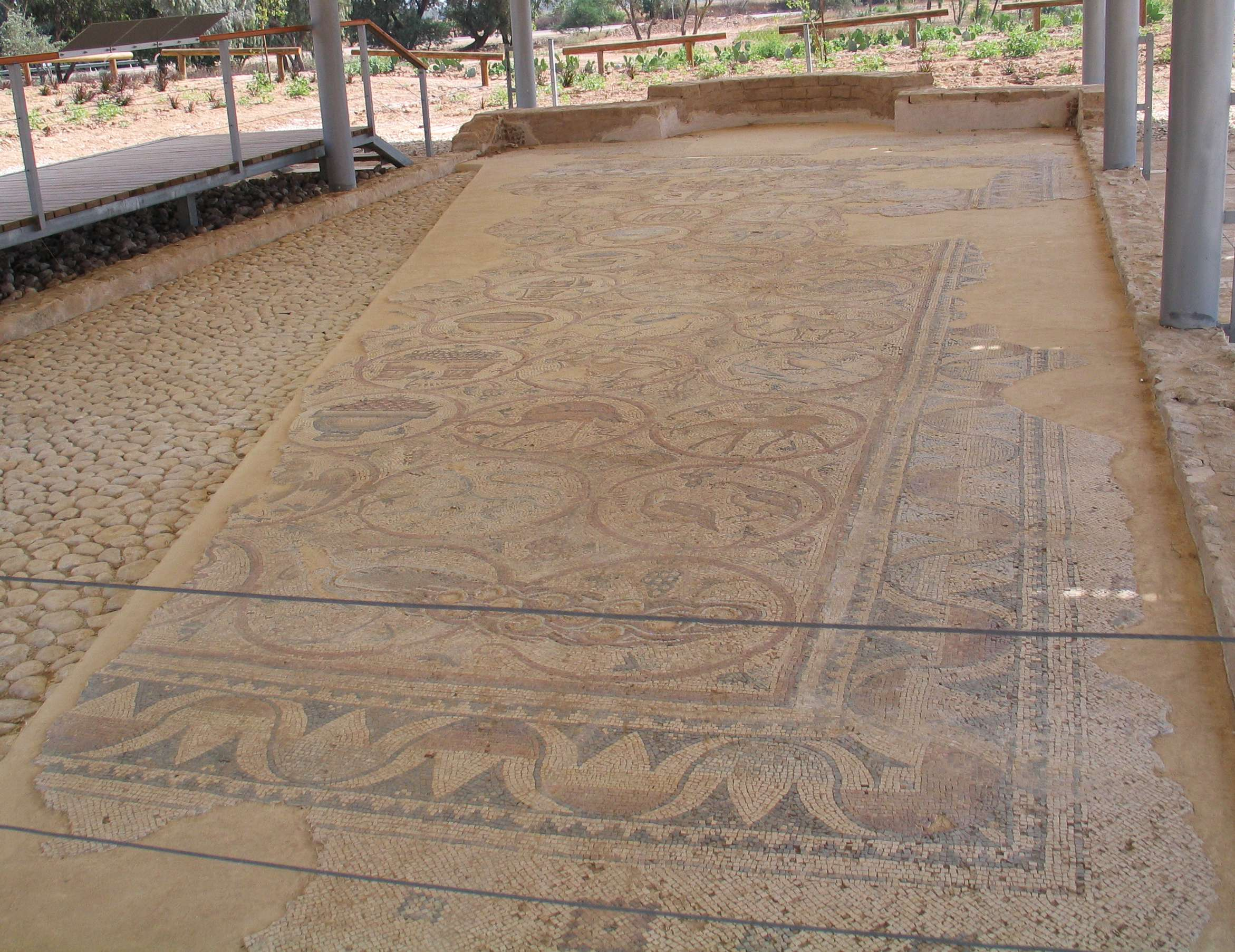
Mosaic, Maon Synagogue, Israel, 5th century.

According to Seth Schwartz, Synagogal Jews were not significantly different from pagans (a view that has been substantially critiqued but is still current in some scholarly circles). They dressed similarly and engaged in similar activities. Many of them participated in civic cults dedicated to the city's gods. They did not hesitate to include images of these gods in their synagogues, as seen in Dura-Europos, where effigies of Cybele, Persephone, Helios, and others adorned the ceiling of the prayer hall. However, they circumcised their children and abstained from eating pork, which were major signs of their adherence to Judaism. In this context, Judaism is better understood as a culture rather than a strictly defined religion.

The scarcity of the term "Rabbi" in archaeological inscriptions found in the Diaspora and Palestine suggests that the rabbinic movement had limited presence and influence in synagogues (excluding Babylonia, where changes occurred earlier). They followed the prescriptions of Jewish law as they interpreted them and thus refrained from making images, avoided entering pagan places of worship and generally did not share meals with pagans. However, they generally coexisted with the majority population. Fergus Millar was drawn to a similar conclusion when studying the inscriptions in Palestine; asking himself about the possibility of a clear distinction between Rabbinic and Synagogal Judaism.

The Jewish-Christian minority also coexisted with Jews from the other groups in the same neighborhoods, as seen in Dura-Europos. They were perceived as a dissident Jewish movement rather than a new religion, at least until the mid-2nd century, notes Costa. Jewish Christians were relatively well received by non-Pharisaic Jews, and even by moderate Pharisees who did not adhere to the formalism of the more radical Pharisees, according to Costa.

=== Priests and rabbis ===
The synagogue assumed the role of a temple in Greco-Roman or Persian society. Jewish Priests (Kohanim) held a central place within it. They conducted the services, read targums (commentaries on the Bible), delivered teachings, and were part of the ruling elite. They represented their community to the imperial authorities.

"Priests were the only social group with a fixed role in synagogue liturgy, while the rabbis presented themselves, at least in the tannaitic texts, as having no interest in the synagogue", notes Paul Flesher. Jewish priests were seen as figures from the past, associated with liturgical practices that were more or less influenced by paganism, according to the attacks of the rabbis. According to Rachel Elior, Simon-Claude Mimouni and other researchers, Jewish priests mostly stayed inside Synagogal Judaism after the destruction of the Second Temple, before progressively joining Rabbinic Judaism or Christianity.

== Synagogal mysticism ==
=== Biblical influences ===
Charles Mopsik and Moshe Idel suggested that mystical currents within Judaism find their source in writings attributed to the prophet Elijah, "the oldest and most prominent figure" of biblical mysticism, the celestial messenger who initiates the reader into the secrets of the Torah.

The figure of Elijah holds a significant place in apocalyptic literature that emerged in the 3rd century BCE in the Jewish schools of the ancient East. This literature of resistance was formed by authors who critically observed the world they lived in while conveying a message of hope. It is associated with another biblical figure, the prophet Ezekiel. His vision of the Merkabah (the "Chariot of God") plays an important role in synagogal literature. A third figure that holds a remarkable position is that of the prophet Daniel, associated with his own vision of God. Angels, messengers, visionaries, and intermediary beings between God and humans take center stage in this literature, while the divine appears to distance itself from humanity.

=== Greek and Persian influences ===
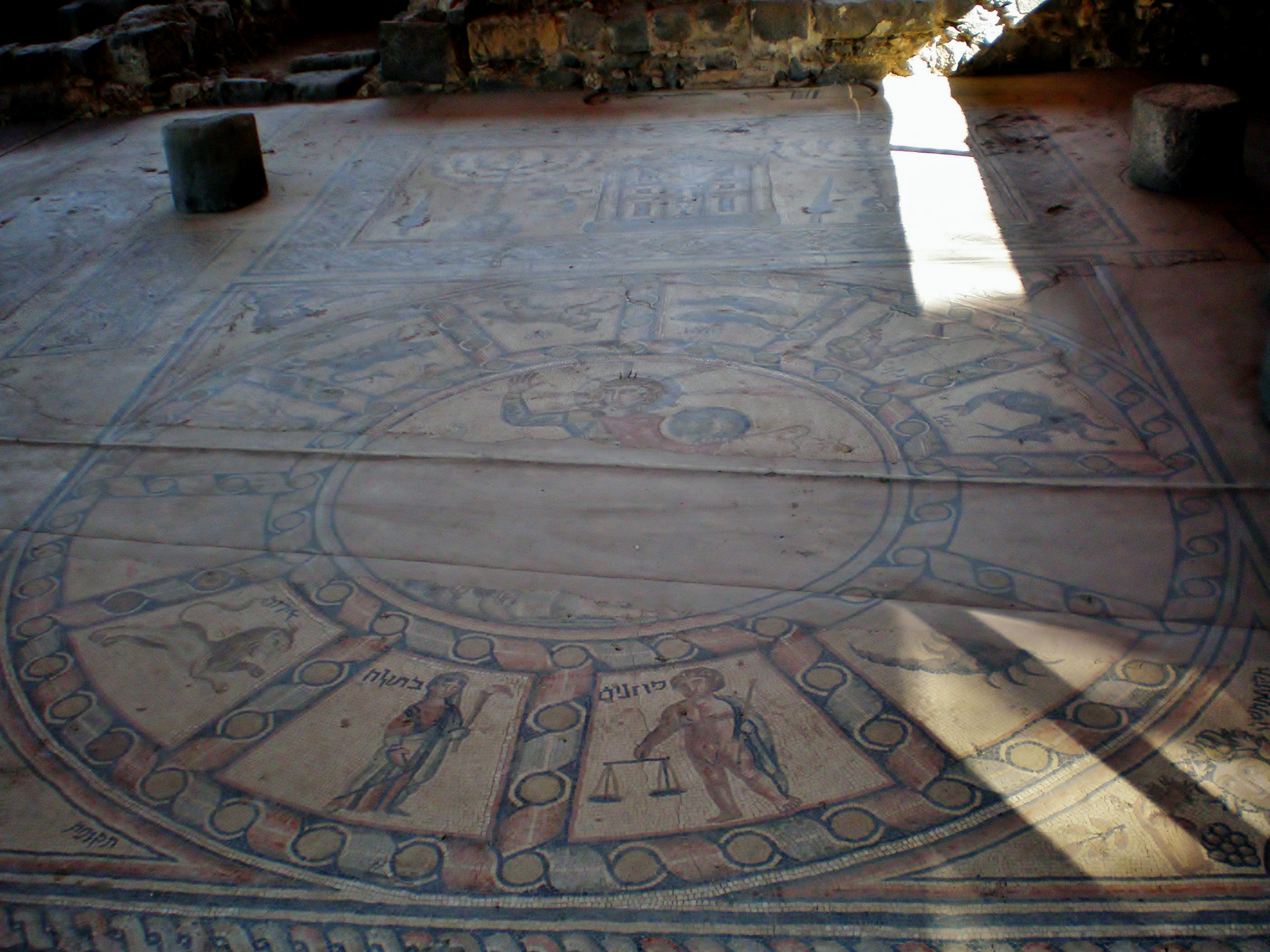
Helios and the Zodiac, Hammath Synagogue, Tiberias, Israel, 5th century.

E. R. Goodenough observed similarities between "Jewish mysteries" and "pagan mysteries." The work of Philo of Alexandria, in particular, absorbed influences from Platonism, Pythagoreanism, Dionysianism, Orphism, and Persian traditions, forming a mystical repository that Goodenough found reflected in the decorations of ancient synagogues. According to Goodenough, what characterizes synagogue art is a "Judaism of light". Thus, for Philo, the God of Israel, incomprehensible, elusive, and inconceivable in theological terms, could still reveal Himself in the form of illumination, a flash of lightning, a "light", which was equated with the cosmic logos, the Messiah, the link between God and humans.

Philo's influence on ancient Jewish Christianity is considerable, and his influence on synagogue Judaism is no less significant. The figures of the zodiac and the god Helios systematically appear in ancient synagogues. Helios symbolizes "divine emanation", a concept also found in the Shekhinah, the immanent divine presence, which the rabbis eventually, albeit reluctantly, accepted in their literature, and which Goodenough associates with ancient Jewish mysticism.

Willem F. Smelik, based on an analysis of Qumran and Targumic texts, corroborated Goodenough's analysis: the righteous become light in the afterlife, taking on the form of an angel or a star. This conception, specific to synagogal mysticism, is not widely appreciated by the rabbis.

=== Messianism ===
Messianism and mysticism converged within the synagogal movement, whereas this was far from the case in the rabbinic movement. The rabbis, at that time, were wary of messianic conceptions. They often involved processes of divine emanation that they disapproved of. The tendency of the rabbis, until the beginning of the 6th century, was "deeply anti-messianic," as noted by Philip Alexander.

=== Binitarianism ===
Daniel Boyarin introduces the concept of binitarianism, which refers to a dual identity of God, with a transcendent, absent, and unrepresentable aspect, as well as an immanent, present, and representable aspect, within both synagogal Judaism and Christianity. Justin Martyr, one of the early Church Fathers, considered this understanding of the divine as one of the foundations of Christian thought, while the rabbis regarded it as heresy, notes Boyarin. He emphasizes that it is through this theological conflict that both Christianity and Judaism were developed, with each constructing themselves through heresiological processes by defining both dogma and heresy. "The two heresiological projects form a perfect mirror", explains Boyarin. "The Rabbis construct (so to speak) Christianity, while Christian authors like Justin construct (so to speak) Judaism."

According to Steve Bélanger, most of the first Christian-Jewish polemical literature, for example, the Dialogue with Trypho, is to be considered as a result of Synagogal/Sacerdotal Judaism conflicts with Christianity, and not a representation of the Rabbinic movement.

=== Plurality ===
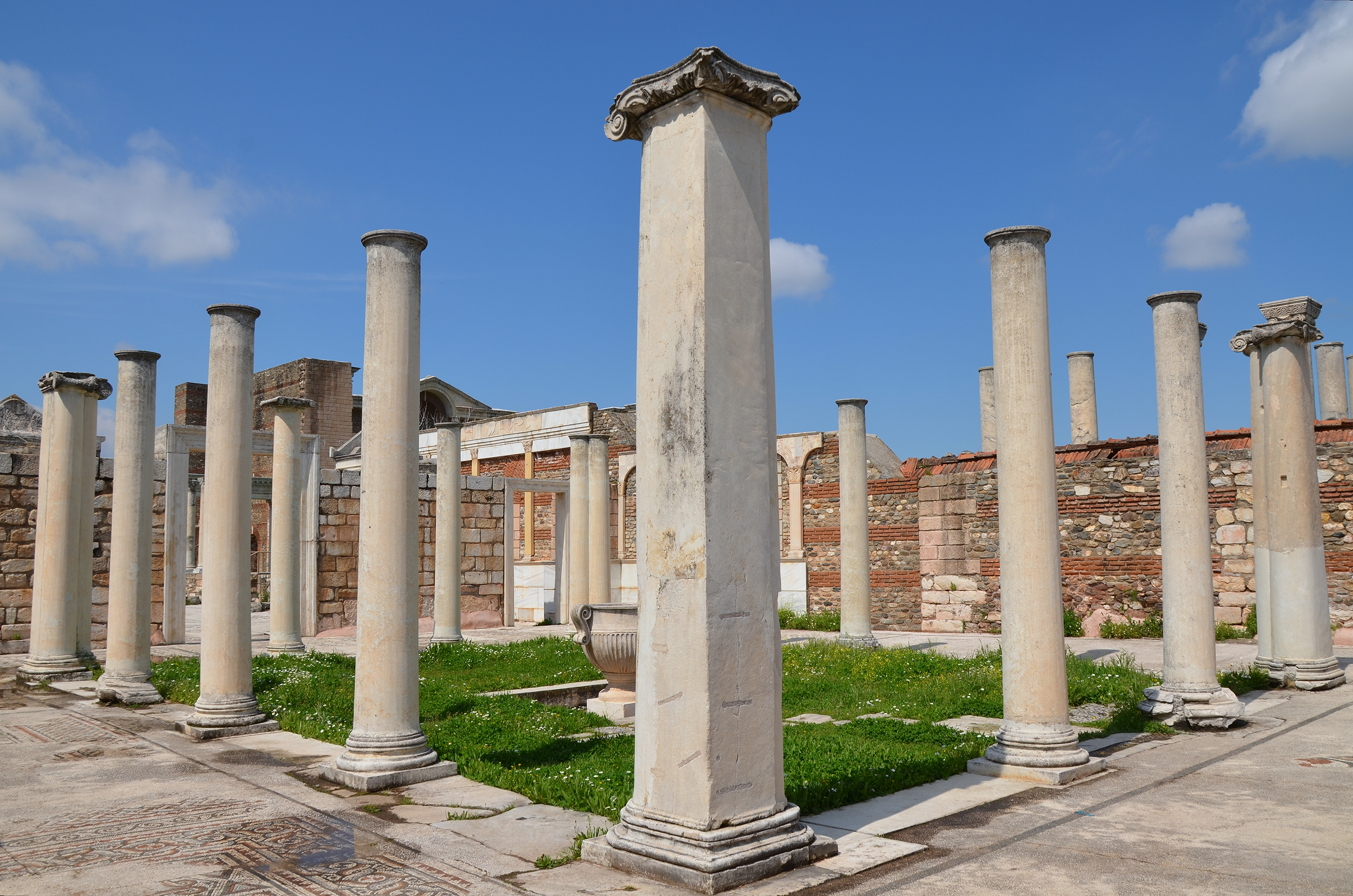
Sardis synagogue, Turkey, 3rd century.

However, a rupture occurred around the 5th century in Rabbinic Judaism when the authors of the Babylonian Talmud admitted that "an Israelite, even if he sins, remains an Israelite." The necessity to integrate, at least partially, the elements of synagogal mysticism into rabbinic literature to satisfy a society for whom the synagogue remained an essential place, imposed on the rabbis to break away from heresiology. According to Boyarin, this was a significant change. Rabbinic Judaism no longer conceived of heretics among the Jews. It abandoned its initial project to embrace a plurality of beliefs, sometimes contradictory, focusing on practices rather than faith.

"This directive becomes almost omnipresent and foundational for later forms of Rabbinic Judaism. There is now practically no possibility for a Jew to cease being Jewish because the very notion of heresy has been ultimately rejected, and Judaism (even if the term is anachronistic) refused to be, ultimately, a religion", concludes Boyarin.

The nature of the opposition between ancient Christianity and Rabbinic Judaism lies in the fact that "they belong to completely different categories," notes Mimouni, who further explains, "From the Christian perspective, Rabbinic Judaism and Christianity fall into the category of religions [...]. From the perspective of the rabbis, Christianity is a religion, while Judaism is not, at least until the attempt of Maimonides and especially until the time of Modernity, when the notion of 'Jewish faith' emerged."

== Synagogal art ==
According to Goodenough, synagogues were conceived within the framework of Hellenistic Judaism in Alexandria. Serving as substitutes for the Jerusalem Temple in the Diaspora, they provided Judeans with a place to celebrate the "mysteries" of a cult that was both mystical and messianic, with the theological keys provided by the philosophy of Philo.

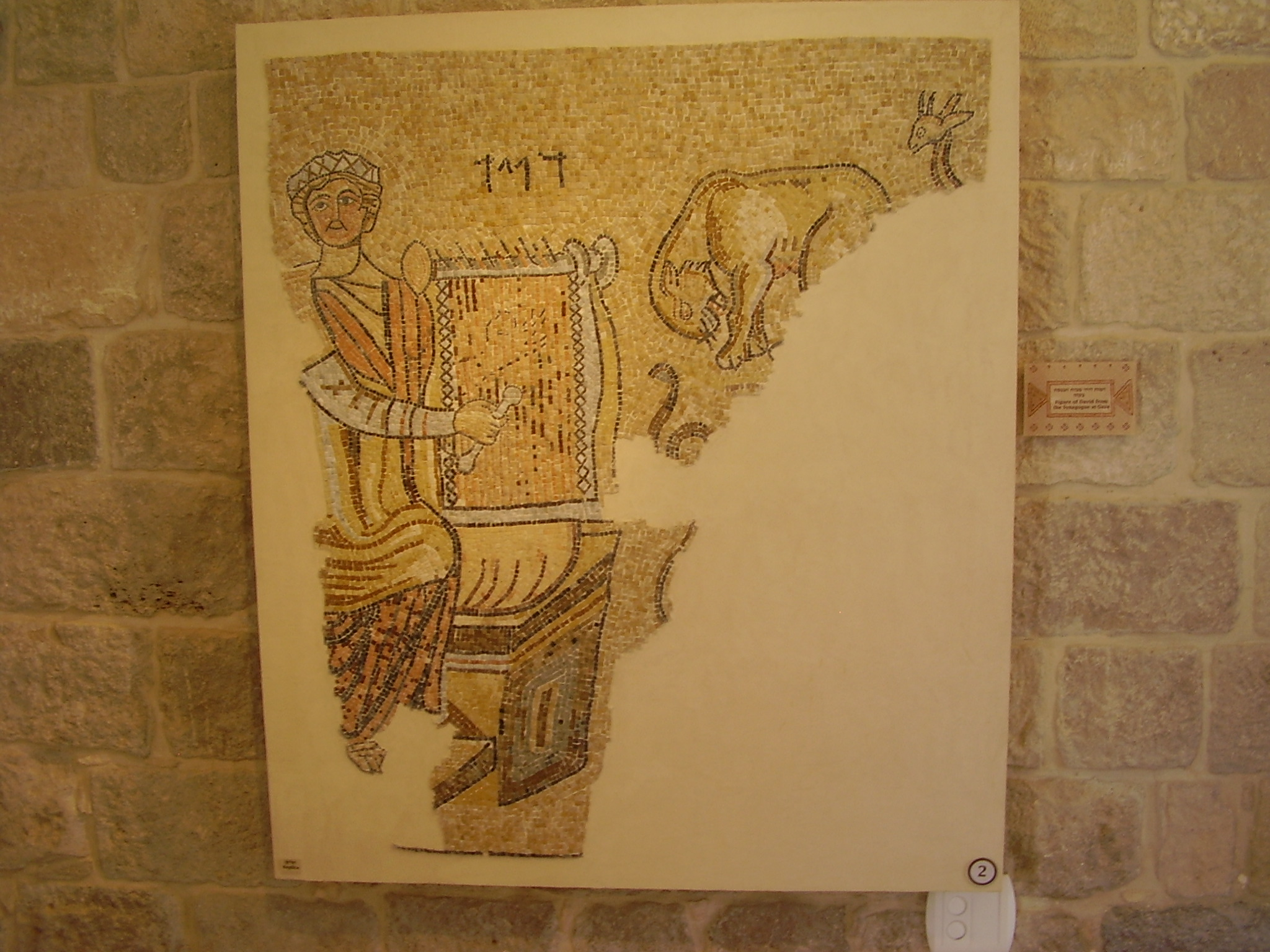
Mosaic of King David playing the harp, Gaza synagogue, Palestine, 7th century.

Schwartz challenged this viewpoint by denying Philo such a significant role in the creation of synagogal art, but without questioning the overall project assigned to him by Goodenough. The synagogue aimed to approach, through its architecture, decor, and liturgy, the mystical union of the divine and the human.

A motif like that of King David depicted as Orpheus creates a connection between Jewish mysticism and Hellenistic Orphic mysticism. The Judeans who appreciated this representation, disregarding the prohibitions set by the rabbis, were not seeking to assimilate into Greek culture but rather to "Judaize Hellenism," according to Goodenough.

The rabbis had a different perspective. They focused on the house of study (bet midrash) and the civil court (bet din) rather than the synagogue (bet knesset). The house of study sometimes took on the role of a synagogue for the rabbis, but it maintained a sense of sobriety both in its exterior and interior. However, the Alexandrian synagogues during Philo's time did not feature figurative images. Such images only appeared in synagogal art around the third century and disappeared by the eighth century, coinciding with the period of convergence and soon fusion between the synagogal movement and the rabbinic movement.

This led Jacob Neusner to propose the hypothesis of a continuous convergence between these two movements since the 1st century. Neusner suggests that by the third century, the convergence was already advanced enough to allow for the emergence of figurative art shared by both tendencies or at least tolerated by the rabbinic trend. This was not only the case in the Roman Empire but also in Babylonia, where the most famous synagogue, Nehardea, was adorned with a statue of a Persian king. The prohibitions stated by the rabbis regarding painting or architecture were always subject to interpretation. Urbach notes that the most tolerant opinions prevailed in the Talmudic academies. By the middle of the 3rd century, the danger of paganism was no longer significant. The rabbis of the Palestinian academies no longer condemned figurative representations. Therefore, ancient Jewish art, instead of resulting from the opposition between the synagogue movement and the rabbinic movement as believed by Goodenough, would rather result from their union.

== Synagogal literature ==
"Synagogal Judaism is documented by sources that were previously considered either Christian (for the pseudepigraphic or apocryphal literature) or rabbinic (for the Targumic or poetic literature)," notes Mimouni. The rabbis primarily preserved texts written in Aramaic, while Christians preserved texts written in Greek. This suggests that Judeans who spoke Aramaic mostly joined the rabbinic movement, while those who spoke Greek aligned with the Christian movement.

=== Literature in the Aramaic language ===
It comes in three main forms:

==== Hekhalot literature ====
Written between the third and eighth centuries, Hekhalot literature discusses the "Palace", which refers to the ideal Temple, the dwelling place of God, and the chariot of God beyond time. The authors of this literature describe their visionary experiences of visiting the Palace in dreams or mystical transports. They explicitly align themselves with the tradition of mystical visionaries from previous centuries, particularly referencing Ezekiel's vision in the Bible. Around twenty texts attributed by tradition to Talmudic sages such as Rabbi Akiva, Shimon bar Yochai, Rabbi Ishmael, Nehunya ben haQana, and others have been preserved. However, the question remains: were these texts truly written by the rabbis themselves, or do they simply indicate the rabbinic culture's appropriation of these texts? This question remains unanswered.

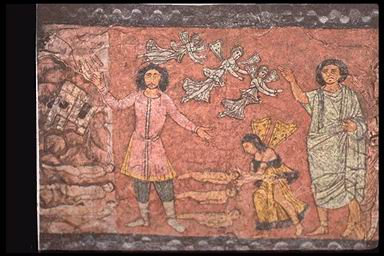
The Vision of Ezekiel, Dura-Europos synagogue, 3rd century.

Gershom Scholem was convinced that the Hekhalot literature belonged to the realm of rabbinic mysticism because its content referred to Talmudic sources, primarily aggadic (non-legal) materials. The "narrative of creation" and the "narrative of the chariot", found in the Talmud, would retain an embryonic form of mysticism that fully unfolds in the Hekhalot literature. This suggests a common mystical foundation shared by the synagogal movement and the rabbinic movement. This analysis is shared by Jacob Neusner and Mimouni. The two movements were likely not as opposed as Goodenough believed, although significant differences did exist between them.

The rabbis were interested in celestial visions to derive theological interpretations from them. However, they generally disapproved of mystical experiences such as transports, trances, and ecstasy that led to such visions. "The ideas, values, ethical notions, and theological concepts are shared by both literatures, although some concepts are more emphasized in one or the other," notes Ron Naiwel. "What sets them apart lies elsewhere: they do not have the same ethical project. Rabbinic literature is centered on the present world, while the Hekhalot literature focuses on immediate access to the celestial realm."

==== Targumic literature ====
Produced over a long period of time, Targumic literature emerged from the liturgical need to translate the Hebrew Bible into Aramaic. Stemming from synagogal culture, it provides a collection of commentaries that have been integrated into rabbinic literature without much difficulty, although Mimouni points out that "the rabbinic movement has not always been favorable to this form of literature and has sometimes censored it."

==== Proto-Kabbalistic literature ====
The main work in this category is the Sefer Yetzirah (the "Book of Creation"), a short treatise that presents itself as a compendium of discoveries regarding the creation of the world. According to rabbinic tradition, it was written by Abraham, while other sources from the same tradition attribute it to Akiva.

Appearing at an uncertain date between the first and eighth centuries, the Sefer Yetzirah is still connected to the Hekhalot literature in its poetic and visionary form, but it distinguishes itself by its primarily cosmological and speculative nature. It succinctly and suggestively presents the major concepts on which Kabbalah is based, particularly the ten sefirot: the "ten abyssal numbers" (esser sefirot belimah), which are assimilated to the ten extensions or "infinite measures" of a central, unique, and unknown principle. It also describes the ten dimensions of the universe in which God has spread: the high, the low, the south, the north, the east, the west, the beginning, the end, the good, and the evil. The Sefer Yetzirah is the first work classified within the Kabbalistic corpus, bridging the culture of the Synagogue and that of Kabbalah.

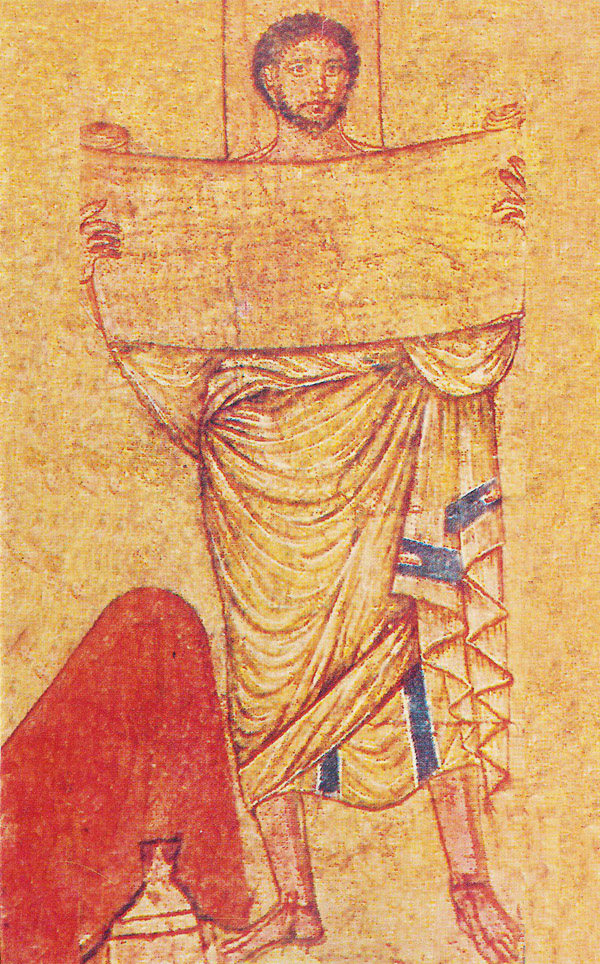
Ezra or Jeremiah, Dura-Europos synagogue, 3rd century

=== Literature in Greek language ===
It comes into four main forms:

==== Translations and extensions of the Bible into Greek ====
This includes the Septuagint, the most famous translation of the Hebrew Bible into Greek, written around the second century BCE, even before the canon of the Hebrew Bible was fixed. It was followed by the translations of Aquila of Sinope, Theodotion, and Symmachus. Additionally, there is the Deuterocanonical literature, which refers to the books classified in the Old Testament according to the Christian canon but not accepted by the Rabbinic canon. These include the two books of Maccabees, the Book of Judith, the Book of Tobit, the Greek passages of the Book of Esther, the Book of Wisdom, Sirach, the Greek passages of the Book of Baruch, and the Greek passages of the Book of Daniel.

==== Apocalyptic and intertestamental literature ====
This category encompasses a collection of mystical texts that were rejected by both the Christian and Rabbinic canons but still enjoyed prestige, leading to their unofficial preservation by members of either movement. These texts are known as Biblical Apocrypha. Simon Claude Mimouni emphasizes that originally, they held the same theological legitimacy as the canonical texts of either tradition. Notably, during their composition in the late 1st century and throughout the 2nd century, both types of texts likely held similar theological status. Remarkable texts in this literature include the Book of Jubilees, the Greek version of the Book of Enoch, the Letter of Aristeas, and the Sibylline Oracles.

The Greek texts from the Dead Sea Scrolls also fall into this category.

==== Historical literature ====
This primarily refers to the works of Flavius Josephus, such as The Jewish War, Antiquities of the Jews, and Against Apion. Josephus provided the perspective of the first historian of Judaism on the various Judean tendencies in the first century.

==== Philosophical literature ====
This mainly pertains to the works of Philo of Alexandria. While preserved by Christian authorities, Philo's works were distanced, if not outright marginalized, by rabbinic authorities. However, Philo's works experienced a resurgence within Judaism in the 12th century, not only within the Kabbalistic schools that revived the ancient Jewish mysticism but also within the Maimonidean schools that extended the Talmudic tradition.

== See also ==
- Boethusians
- Beth Alpha
- Hammat Tiberias
- Hellenistic Judaism
- Jewish Christianity
- Sadducees
- Beth knesset/Synagogue
- Therapeutae
- Tzippori Synagogue
