= Merzbach (surname) =

Merzbach is a surname. It is the surname of:

- Paul Merzbach (1888–1943), Austrian screenwriter and film director
- Uta Merzbach (1933–2017), German-American historian of mathematics
- Yonah Merzbach (1900–1980), Rabbi of Darmstadt and later rosh yeshiva at Kol Torah
- Ely Merzbach (1950–), Israeli mathematician
