= Roger Winsbacher =

French rabbi (1928-2012)

Roger Winsbacher (19 June 1928 – 13 February 2012) was a French rabbi and educator known for his oratorical and pedagogical skills.

== Biography ==
Roger (David) Winsbacher, was born in Strasbourg on 19 June 1928 to an Alsatian Jewish family. At age eleven, during the onset of the Second World War, he sought refuge in Limoges with his family, enrolling in an ORT school in the city.

Future Chief Rabbi Abraham Deutsch, originally from Strasbourg, joined the family in Limoges and became a large influence on Winsbacher's life. It was Rabbi Deutsch who pushed Winsbacher to choose a Rabbinical career.

Roger Winsbacher spent the rest of the war in Switzerland where he continued his studies under Rabbi Haim Gittler. After the war, Winsbacher studied at the Séminaire israélite de France in Paris. Following military service in French Algeria, he became Rabbi of Saint-Louis (Haut-Rhin), and later of Obernai (Bas-Rhin). He was close to Rabbi Sneiders of Basel and looked up to Chief Rabbi Avraham David Horowitz or Strasbourg, becoming one of his most devoted followers. When Rabbi Horowitz made Aliyah to Israel, Winsbacher took his place at Adath Israel, the Polish rite synagogue in Strasbourg.

Rabbi Winsbacher taught at the Yeshiva Ketana de Strasbourg where he influenced generations of students. He was known for his pedagogical skills and the clarity of his teaching. He was married to Danielle Weil, a local teacher in Strasbourg and a sister of Liliane Ackermann. The Winsbachers had three sons.

When Winsbacher retired as rabbi of Adath Israel, he was succeeded by Michaël Szmerla, the dayan of Strasbourg. Winsbacher died in Strasbourg on 13 February 2012 and was buried the next day in the cimetière "Etz Haïm" de Cronenbourg. The funeral was conducted by Chief Rabbi Samuel Yaffe-Schlessinger and in a rare occasion, the coffin was transported to Adath Israel, where Rabbi Szmerla delivered the eulogy and Chief Rabbi of Strasbourg René Gutman recited the Tehillim.

== See also ==
- Synagogue Adath Israël (Strasbourg)
