= Ernest Gugenheim =

French Rabbi

Personal life
- Born: January 22, 1916 Westhoffen, France
- Died: March 27, 1977 (aged 61) Paris
- Spouse: Claude-Annie Gugenheim (m. 1949)
- Children: Michel Gugenheim
- Parents: Max Gugenheim (father); Martha Gugenheim (mother)
- Education: Mir yeshiva (Poland)

Religious life
- Religion: Judaism

Ernest Simha Gugenheim (January 22, 1916 – March 22, 1977) was a French rabbi. He was a teacher, and later director, at the Israelite Seminary of France, and was one of the prominent figures of French Jewry.

== Biography ==
Gugenheim was born in Westhoffen in Alsace, France on January 22, 1916 to Rabbi Max Gugenheim, who was the rabbi of the town and came from a family of rabbis. His mother, Martha née Mayer, died when he was about 4 years old. He was the youngest of four children.

His father, a graduate of the Hildesheimer Rabbinical Seminary in Berlin, was his first teacher and educated him in the way of Torah im derech eretz advocated by Rabbi Samson Raphael Hirsch. In 1933, Ernest entered the Israelite Seminary of France in Paris, under the direction of Maurice Liber. In January 1938, at the age of 22, he left for Lithuania to study at the yeshiva of Mir. He describes extensively in his letters to his teacher his daily experiences in a world since erased by the Holocaust.

Eight months later he was called back to France by his father, who sensed that a new conflict between France and Germany was about to break out. In the end, the confrontation was postponed, following the Munich Agreement. He was drafted into the French army shortly after his arrival, and was captured by the Germans at the beginning of World War II, in 1940. Until the end of the war, Jewish soldiers, most of whom were also Alsatians, were not allowed in a POW camp. He served as a spiritual leader to the other prisoners in the camp, until his release in 1945, after the surrender of Germany.

After his release, he was appointed a teacher of Talmud and rabbinic law at the Israelite Seminary of France. There he met his future wife, Claude-Anne (Hannah) d'Alsace, who was accepted to the school of liturgy and pedagogy that was open at that time. He served in these positions in the Seminary until his death, and also headed it as temporary director from 1949 to 1951, until the appointment of Rabbi Henri Shili. In 1977 he was appointed as the permanent director of the Seminary, and died a few days later.

During these years he lived in an apartment in the Seminary building, forming a close relationship with the apprentice rabbis and being an available address for them. Under his influence, the Seminary moved to a more conservative and pious line than before, a process that was finally completed with the immigration of North African Jews to France.

Gugenheim was also the editorial director of the Chantiers du Rabbinat, taught at the Yabné School, and was a member of the rabbinical court, dealing with points of matrimonial and civil law, before being responsible for conversions to Judaism. In 1966, he was named Chevalier of the Legion of Honor.

Simultaneously with his teaching in the rabbinical beit midrash of France, he taught in the Jewish high school École Yabné, and was a member of the rabbinical court of the Consistory. He was appointed vice president of the court in 1952, where he mainly dealt with areas related to Jewish identity and marriage, and soon became responsible for the issue of conversions. As part of his position, he was also in charge of agunot and divorce refusals. Together with legal officials from the community, he created a system that allows women who were civilly divorced but did not receive a divorce from their husbands to sue them in court and demand compensation.

Along with these activities, he served as an available address for questions, and worked to make the values of Judaism and its laws clearly accessible in French. His halachic authority, along with his accessibility to applicants from the Jewish community and beyond, made him perceived as an authoritative figure regarding the view of Orthodox Judaism in France. Thus he was invited to the committees of the National Assembly of France, to present the Jewish view on the issues of contraception and termination of pregnancy before legislation on these issues. In 1966 he was awarded as a Knight of the Legion of Honour, and in 1973 as a Grand Rabbin. (Note: Literally: "Great Rabbi". An official title given in France to important rabbis, such as district rabbis, by the Consistory.)

== Personal life ==
Gugenheim had six children. His wife was an educator and teacher of Judaism, the director of the Ariel Jewish School in France, the editor-in-chief of the quarterly The Teacher for teachers in Jewish schools, author and editor of books. His son Rabbi Michel Gugenheim was the director of the Israelite Seminary of France, and was later appointed Chief Rabbi of Paris.

He died on March 22, 1977 in Paris after a long illness caused by a brain tumor, and was buried in the cemetery of his native town, Westhoffen.

== Works ==
His works mainly deal with halacha, but also include French translations of Jewish classics and contributions to the Encyclopedia Universalis and the Pléiade encyclopedia. His halachic research and answers were collected in his books Le Judaïsme dans la vie quotidienne (Judaism in Everyday Life) and Les portes de la loi (The Gates of the Halacha). His letters were compiled by his wife and children into a book published in 2006, Lettres de Mir (Letters from Mir), and later translated into English.
