= René-Samuel Sirat =

French rabbi (1930–2023)

- רנה-שמואל סירא
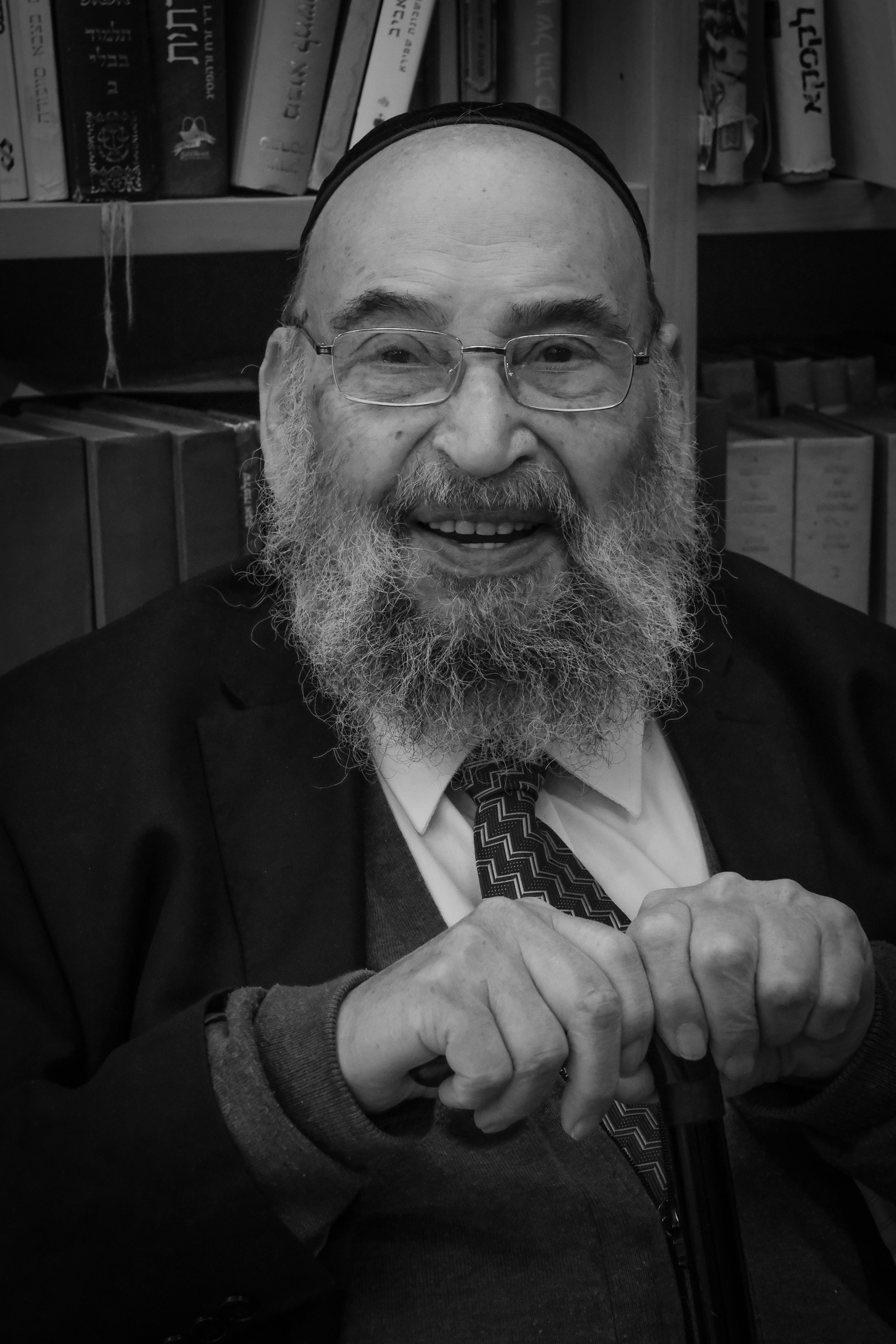
- Sirat in 2019

Chief Rabbi of France
- In office 1981–1988
- Preceded by: Jacob Kaplan
- Succeeded by: Joseph Sitruk

Personal details
- Born: 13 November 1930 Bône, French Algeria
- Died: 10 February 2023 (aged 92) Jerusalem, Israel
- Spouse: Colette Sirat (divorced)
- Occupation: Rabbi

René-Samuel Sirat (Hebrew: רנה-שמואל סירא; 13 November 1930 – 10 February 2023) was a French rabbi who served as Chief Rabbi of France from 1981 to 1988. He was also a director of the Hebrew studies department at the Institut national des langues et civilisations orientales.

== Biography ==
Sirat was born in Bône, French Algeria, on 13 November 1930. His first language was Arabic, and he later learned French. Sirat was allowed to attend schools during the Vichy government despite being a Jew because his father fought at Verdun in World War I. In 1946, Sirat moved to mainland France to study at the yeshiva in Aix-les-Bains. He later attended the Jewish Seminary of France in Paris, becoming its youngest graduate at age 21.

In 1952, Sirat became a rabbi in Clermont-Ferrand, then at Toulouse. Sirat returned to Paris four years later, where he became a rabbi and teacher of Hebrew. In 1962, one of his brothers was killed in a terrorist attack in Algeria during the civil war. Sirat would later serve as a translator for President Charles de Gaulle, and co-founded the University Center for Jewish Studies. Sirat was also key in convincing the French minister of education to establish a chair of Hebrew studies at INALCO.

In 1980, Sirat was elected Chief Rabbi of France, taking office the following year. During his seven-year term, Sirat oversaw the banning of microphones and organs during the Shabbat, and was described as a "fervent Zionist". He participated in the first Incontro interreligioso di Assisi in 1986 alongside Pope John Paul II. In 1997, he called for the abolition of the party-list proportional representation system in Israel. In 1999, he co-founded the Fondation pour la recherche et le dialogue interreligieux et inter-culturels in Geneva alongside Joseph Ratzinger and the Ecumenical Patriarchate of Constantinople. In 2000, Sirat gained the attention of President of the United States Bill Clinton for the foundation of the Faculty of Book Religion at the University of France of Morocco. He was the founding director of the UNESCO committee "Knowledge of the Religion of the Book and Education for Peace".

Sirat moved to Jerusalem in 2013, and continued advocating for the State of Israel. He was founding president of the Institut universitaire européen Rachi de Troyes, and donated his Talmudic library to the institution in 2017. Sirat was also a moderator of the World Conference of Religions for Peace, and met with Pope Francis in 2018. He was a supporter of UNESCO's Project Aladdin, was a member of the Israelite Central Consistory of France, and served as president of the Académie Hillel.

Sirat died in Jerusalem on 10 February 2023, at age 92.

== Decorations ==
- Officer of the Legion of Honour (1998)
- Grand Officer of the Ordre national du Mérite (2010)
