= Mayer Lambert =

French Jewish Oriental scholar and Hebraist

Mayer Lambert (December 23, 1863 – October 30, 1930) was a French Jewish Oriental scholar and Hebraist.

== Life ==
Lambert was born on December 23, 1863, in Metz, France, the son of the religious textbook author Elie Lambert. His grandfather was Chief Rabbi Lion Mayer Lambert of Metz, his great-grandfather was Chief Rabbi Aaron of Worms, and through the latter he was a descendant of Gershon Ulif Ashkenazi and the sixteenth-century Worms rabbi and hazzan Elijah Blin.

Lambert initially studied in Metz. He then went to the rabbinical seminary in Paris, receiving his rabbinical degree from there in 1886. He later studied at the Sorbonne. In 1887, he became professor of Arabic and Syriac at the seminary. In 1894, he also joined the seminary's faculty of Hebrew. During that time, he also taught Hebrew at the École Normale Orientale, which was run by the Alliance Israélite Universelle. In 1903, he became professor of Arabic and Syriac at the École des Hautes Études. He was associated with Joseph Derenbourg for many years in Derenbourg's research into Hebrew and oriental literature.

Lambert contributed a number of articles to periodicals like the Revue des Etudes Juives and the Journal Asiatique. He also contributed to the publication of the Corpus Inscriptionum Semiticarum and was involved with a French translation of the Bible that was issued by the French rabbinate. He published, among other articles, Eléments de Grammaire Hébraique in 1890, Commentaire sur le Séfer Yesira, ou livre de la Création par Saadiah in 1891, Saadiah's version of and commentary on Proverbs, text and French translation with Derenbourg Oeuvres complètes de Saadia. Traduction des Proverbes in 1894, and Glossaire hébreu-français du xiiime siècle with L. Brandin in 1905. Three parts of his work Traité de Grammaire Hébraïque were published between 1931 and 1938.

Lambert died on October 30, 1930.
