= Jacob Kaplan =

Rabbi Jacob Kaplan
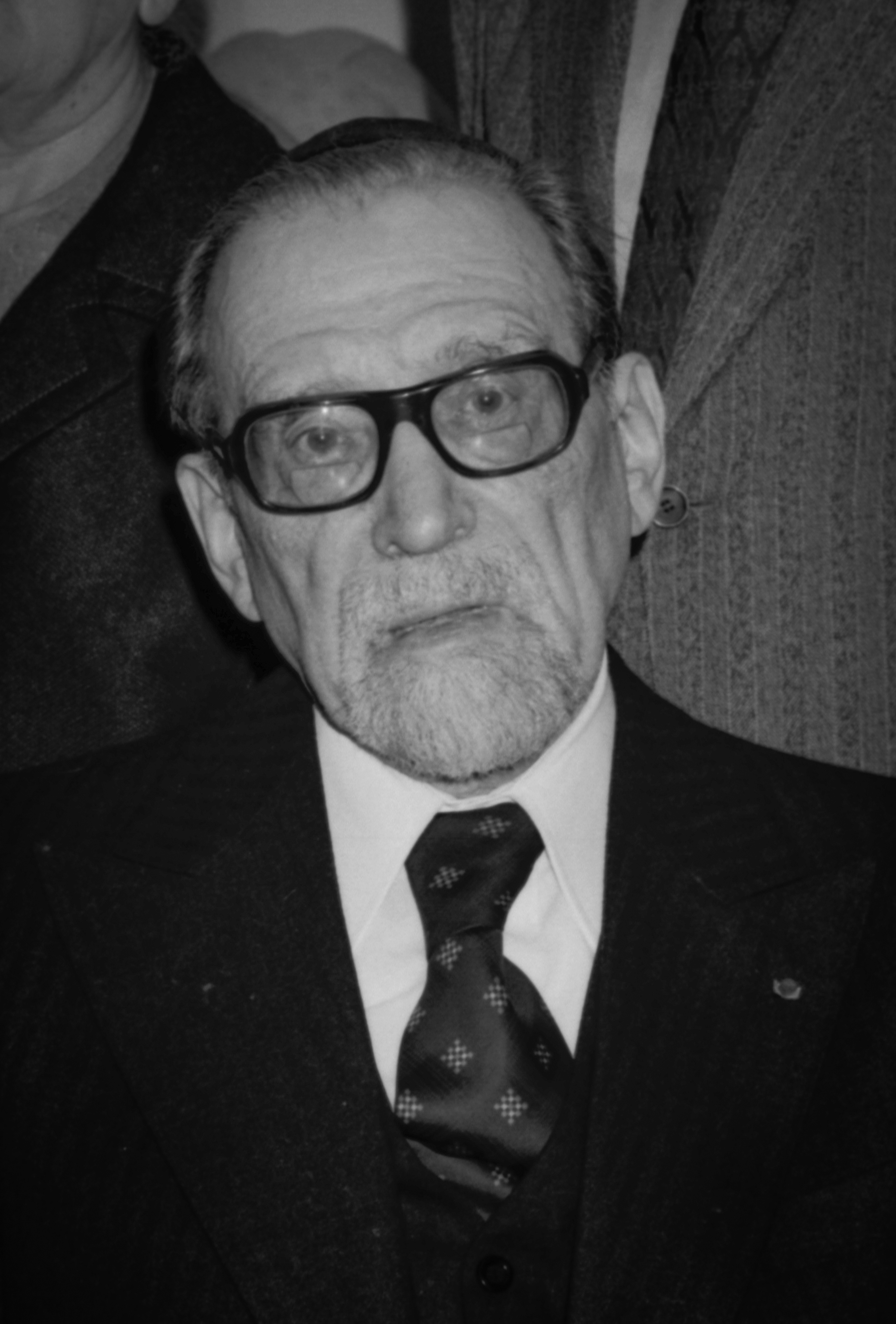

Chief Rabbi of Paris
- In office 1950–1980

Chief Rabbi of France
- In office 1955–1980
- Preceded by: Rabbi Isaïe Schwartz
- Succeeded by: Rabbi René-Samuel Sirat

Personal details
- Born: Jacob Kaplan; November 28, 1895 Paris, France
- Died: December 5, 1994 (aged 99) Paris, France

Rabbi Jacob Kaplan (November 28, 1895 – December 5, 1994) was a French rabbi who served as the Chief Rabbi of Paris from 1950 to 1980 and as the Chief Rabbi of France from 1955 to 1980.

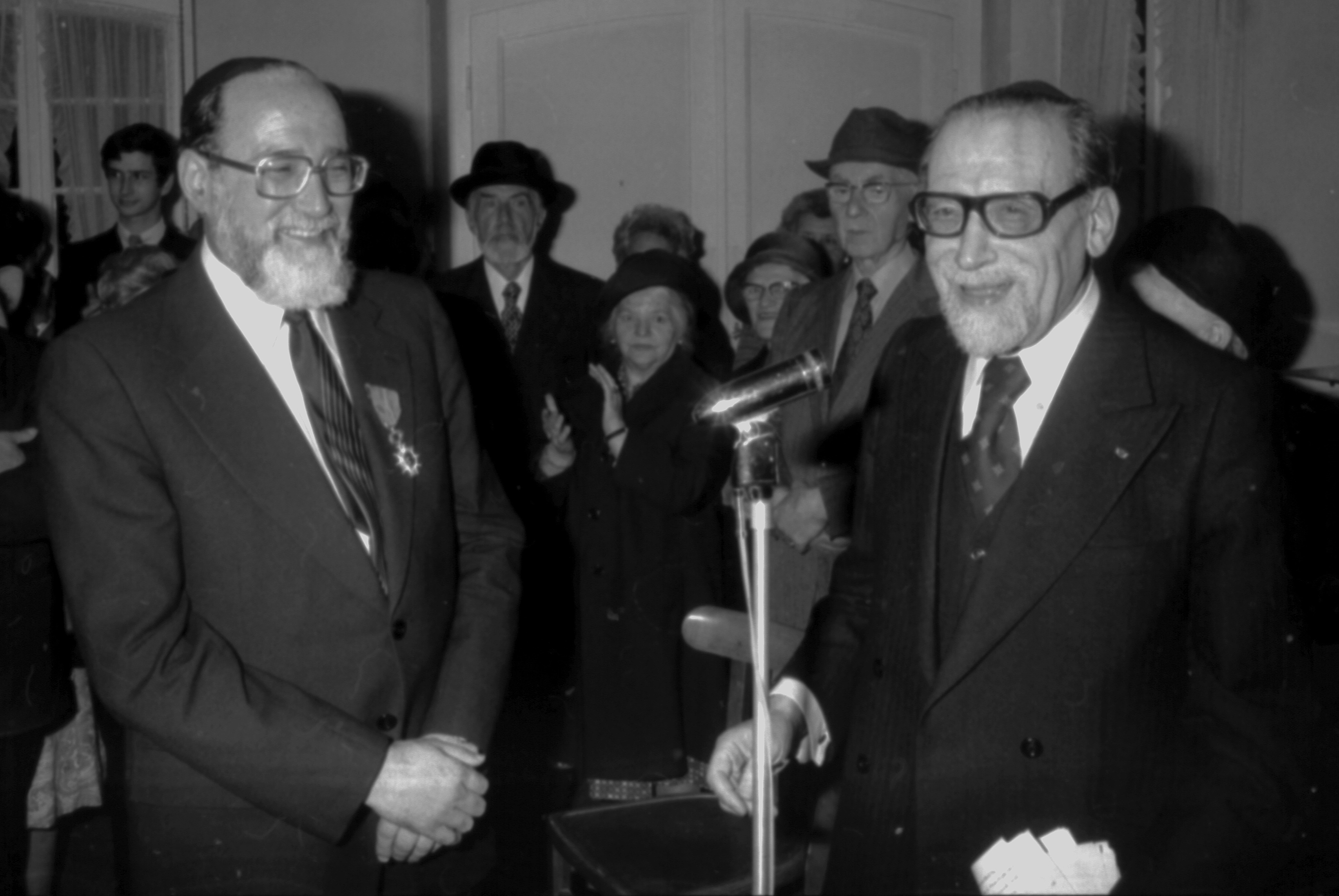
Max Warschawski and Jacob Kaplan by Claude Truong-Ngoc, 1978

== Biography ==
Jacob Kaplan was born in Paris, France, to a Jewish family. He served in World War One and was later ordained as a rabbi.

In 1950, Jacob Kaplan was elected Chief Rabbi of Paris. Kaplan engaged in interfaith dialogue in France with leaders of other religious communities. For this, he received the Légion d'honneur, France's highest civilian decoration.

Kaplan retired in 1981 and died in 1994, at the age of 99.
