= Sardis Synagogue =

Ancient former synagogue in Manisa Province, Turkey

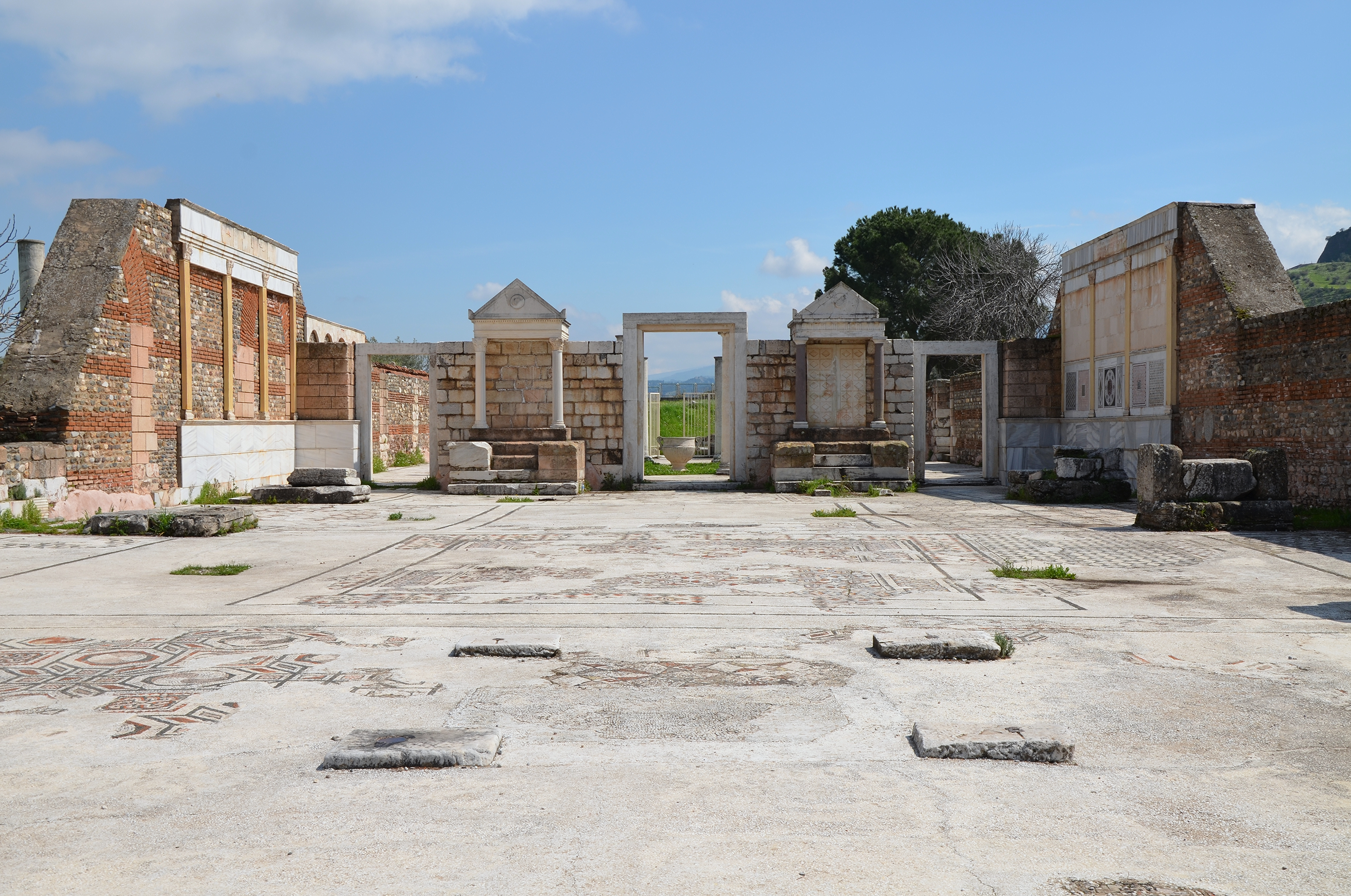
- The former synagogue ruins, in 2015

- Location of the former synagogue ruins in modern-day Aegean Region of Turkey

Religion
- Affiliation: Judaism (former)
- Rite: Romaniote
- Ecclesiastical or organizational status: Synagogue (ruins); Jewish museum
- Status: Archaeological site

Location
- Location: Sardis, Manisa Province, Aegean Region
- Country: Turkey
- Interactive map of Sardis Synagogue
- Coordinates: 38°29′18″N 28°02′25″E

Architecture
- Type: Synagogue architecture
- Style: Roman architecture
- Completed: Late 3rd century CE
- Materials: Stone

The Sardis Synagogue is a former ancient Jewish synagogue, that was discovered in the modern-day town of Sardis, in the Manisa Province, in the Aegean Region of western Turkey. The former synagogue building is now an archaeological site and Jewish museum. The archaeological site is the largest Jewish site known from antiquity.

== History ==
Sardis was under numerous foreign rulers until its incorporation into the Roman Republic in 133 BCE. The city served then as the administrative center of the Roman province of Lydia. Sardis was reconstructed after the catastrophic 17 CE earthquake, and it enjoyed a long period of prosperity under Roman rule.

Sardis is believed to have gained its Jewish community in the 3rd century BCE, as that was when the Seleucid king Antiochus III (223–187 BCE) encouraged Jews from various countries, including Babylonia, to move to Sardis. The historian Josephus wrote of a decree from Lucius Antonius, a Roman proquaestor of 50–49 BCE: "Lucius Antonius...to [the Sardian people], sends greetings. Those Jews, who are fellow citizens of Rome, came to me, and showed that they had an assembly of their own, according to their ancestral laws. [They had this assembly] from the beginning, as also a place of their own, wherein they determined their suits and controversies with one another. Therefore, upon their petition to me, so that these might be lawful for them, I ordered that their privileges be preserved, and they be permitted to do accordingly."1 (Ant., XIV:10, 17). "A place of their own" is generally taken as a reference to the synagogue at Sardis. Josephus noted that Caius Norbanus Flaccus, a Roman proconsul at the end of the 1st century BCE, upheld the rights of the Jews of Sardis to practice their religion, including the right to donate to the Temple in Jerusalem. (Ant., XVI:6,6).

== Archaeological expeditions ==
The first extensive scientific expeditions in the area took place between 1910 and 1914. Director of the Ottoman Imperial Museum (currently known as Istanbul Archeology Museums) Osman Hamdi Bey invited Prof. Howard Crosby Butler of Princeton University to carry out the expedition. They executed the last season in 1922, and Prof. Butler unveiled Temple of Artemis and Necropolis of Sardis. After these discoveries Prof. Butler died unexpectedly and excavations stopped for that period.

Later on, in 1958, Archeology Professor George M. A. Hanfmann of Harvard University and Dean of the Architecture School at Cornell University, Prof. Henry Detweiler started a new series of expeditions. In collaboration with the General Directorate of Cultural Heritage and Museums affiliated to Ministry of Culture and Tourism of the Turkish Republic, the annual archeological expeditions to Sardis continue to this day. This series of expeditions that has been going over six decades is called "the Archeological Exploration of Sardis". Every year a group of 50 to 80 including scholars, professionals and students competent in archeology, art history, archeology, anthropology and many other disciplines from all around the world travel to Sardis to participate in the explorations.

In 1962, these excavations unearthed perhaps the most impressive synagogue in the western diaspora yet discovered from antiquity, yielding over eighty Greek and seven Hebrew inscriptions as well as numerous mosaic floors. (For evidence in the east, see Dura Europos in Syria.) The discovery of the Sardis synagogue has reversed previous assumptions about Judaism in the later Roman empire. Along with the discovery of the godfearers/theosebeis inscription from Aphrodisias, it provides indisputable evidence for the continued vitality of Jewish communities in Asia Minor, their integration into general Roman imperial civic life, and their size and importance at a time when many scholars previously assumed that Christianity had eclipsed Judaism.

== Architectural structure ==
The synagogue's plan resembles early Christian basilicas. However, thanks to the abundant Hebrew and Greek inscriptions and menorah representations that were found, it was successfully identified as a synagogue.

The entryway was through a colonnaded forecourt in the east. It was roofed on the sides with an open center. In its original state, the forecourt was covered with painted plaster and decorated with marble. These decorations were added afterward, possibly during the 5th century CE. At the center of the forecourt, there was a fountain for congregants to wash their hands before the prayer.

Following the forecourt there was an assembly hall, large enough to hold nearly one thousand people. This hall is also decorated with marble. However, these decorations seem to have been placed on the walls earlier than the ones in the forecourt, during the early 4th century CE. Additionally, they have inscriptions in Greek including the donors' names on them. During the excavations, two shrines lying lateral to the center were discovered.

== Manisa (Magnesia), Jewish community ==
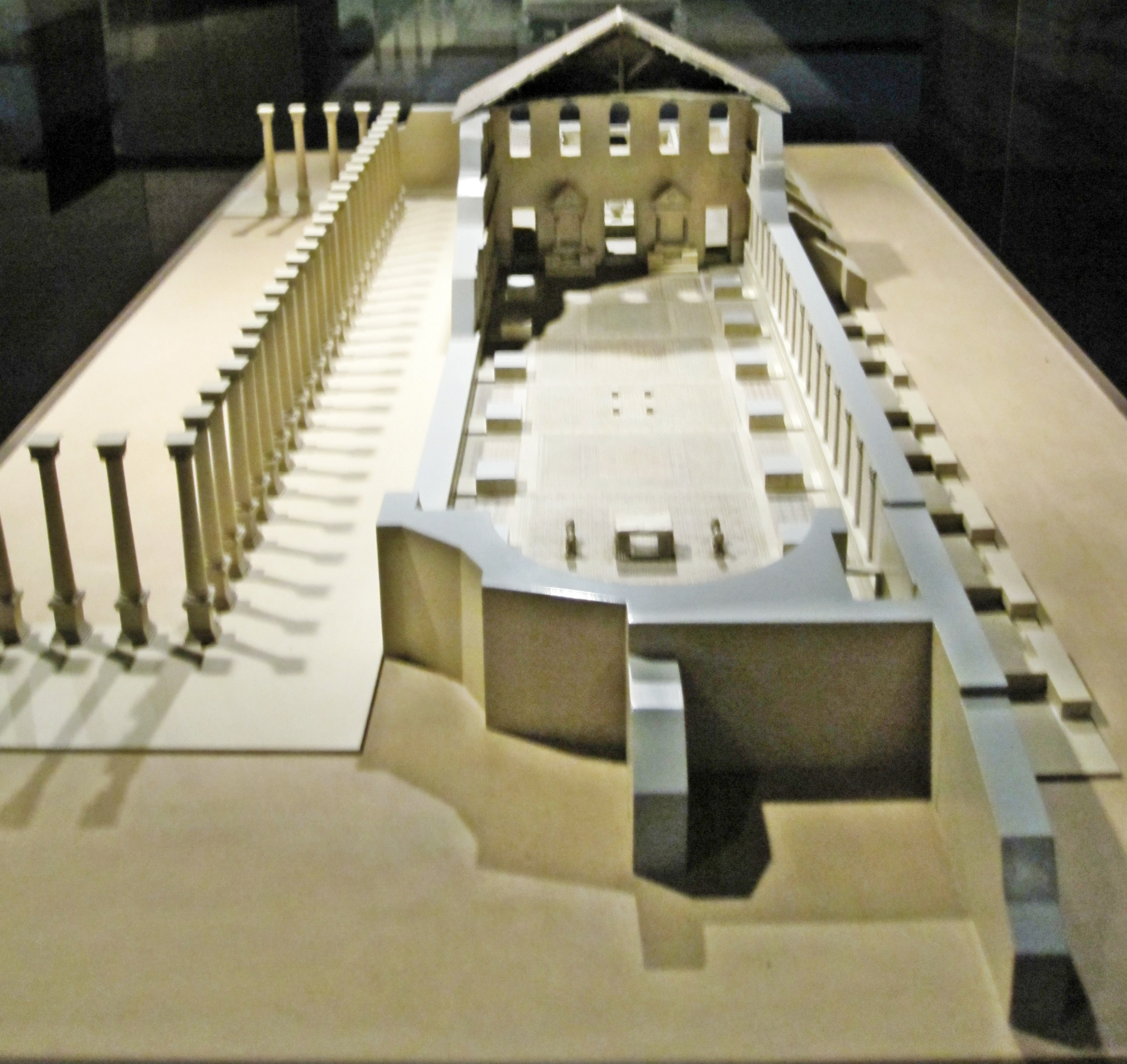
A model of the Sardis synagogue

A Romaniote Jewish community had existed there since the Byzantine Empire, praying in the Etz Ha-Hayim Synagogue. After 1492, Jews expelled from Spain settled there, joining approximately one hundred Romaniote families. These newcomers founded two synagogues: Lorca and Toledo. At the end of the 19th century, the Alliance Israélite Universelle inaugurated two schools, one for boys in 1891 and one for girls in 1896. At the beginning of the 20th century, the Jewish community numbered about 2,000 out of a total population of some 40,000. Greece conquered Manisa in 1919, and when they retreated in 1922, a large conflagration destroyed much of the town including many Jewish institutions. Most of the Jews left their community and emigrated to France, South America, the United States, and Mandatory Palestine. Today, there are no Jews in Manisa. There were three Jewish cemeteries in Manisa.

The most ancient was damaged after the 1878 Turko-Russian war. In 1900 a wall was built around the second cemetery that was until then an open field. The third was acquired in the 1930s. The two ancient cemeteries have since been destroyed. At the time of writing his book, Abraham ben Mordecai Galante (d. before 1589) could still read some of the oldest tombstones. The tombstone data of the new cemetery has been collected and computerized by Prof. Minna Rozen (Diaspora Studies Institute of Tel Aviv University) but has not yet been published.

== See also ==
- Historic synagogues
- History of the Jews in Turkey
- Jewish Christianity
- List of synagogues in Turkey
- Magnesia on the Maeander
- Synagogal Judaism
