= Colette Sirat =

French writer (born 1934)

- Born: Colette Salomon; 2 November 1934; Paris
- Occupation: Philosopher, Judaic scholar, medievalist
- Employer: Ben-Gurion University of the Negev (1970–1975)
- Awards: Ordre des Palmes académiques (1998)
- Website: www.colettesirat.com
- Position held: director of studies (2003–)

Colette Sirat (born in Paris on November 2, 1934) is a French philosopher and paleographer and Director of Studies in medieval Hebrew paleography at the École pratique des hautes études.

== Life ==
She is the daughter of Abraham (Boumi) Salamon and Laura Salamon. Boumi Salamon, originally from Czechoslovakia, arrived in Paris in 1924, where he worked as an upholsterer. In 1927, he returned to Czechoslovakia to do his military service, before returning to France for the definitive time. Laura Salamon is originally from Transylvania. She arrived in Paris at the age of 18, in September 1929.

At the age of 17, in December 1951, Colette Salamon married Rabbi René-Samuel Sirat.

René-Samuel Sirat and Colette Sirat had three children. She divorced her husband in 1973, when the youngest daughter was 16.

=== Teaching ===
From 1969, she was Directeur d'études at the École pratique des hautes études. She taught as a professor at the Ben-Gurion University of the Negev (1970–1975).

== Awards ==
- Legion of Honour.
- Ordre des Palmes académiques in (1998).

== Works ==
- Sirat, Colette (1976). Ecriture et civilisations. Paris. ISBN 2-222-01944-3.
- ————— (1985). Les papyrus en caractères hébraïques trouvés en Égypte. Paris. ISBN 2-222-03457-4.
- ————— (1995). A history of jewish philosophy in the middle ages. Cambridge. ISBN 0-521-39727-8.
- ————— (2002a). Du scribe au livre. Les manuscrits hébreux au Moyen Age. Paris. ISBN 2-271-05156-8.
- ————— (2002b). Hebrew Manuscripts of the Middle Ages. Cambridge University Press. ISBN 9780521770798.
- ————— (2006). Writing as handwork : a history of handwriting in Mediterranean and Western culture. Turnhout: Brepols. ISBN 2503521169.

== Sources ==
- Hamesse, Jacqueline; Weijers, Olga, eds. (2005). Écriture et réécriture des textes philosophiques médiévaux. Volume d'hommage offert à Colette Sirat. Turnhout. ISBN 2-503-52424-9.
- De Lange, Nicholas; Olszowy-Schlanger, Judith, eds. (2014). Manuscrits hébreux et arabes. Mélanges en l'honneur de Colette Sirat. Turnhout. ISBN 978-2-503-55152-4.
- Salamon, Laura (1999). Souvenirs. Paris, Cahors: France Quercy.
