= Liliane Ackermann =

French community leader, writer, lecturer

- Born: September 3, 1938; Strasbourg, France
- Died: February 3, 2007 (aged 68); Strasbourg, France
- Occupations: Microbiologist, community leader, writer, and lecturer
- Spouse: Henri Ackermann
- Children: Théo, Jacqui, Anne, Raoul, Eric, Charles, Marc
- Parent(s): Lucien Weil and Béatrice Haas

Liliane Aimée Ackermann (née Weil) (September 3, 1938 – February 3, 2007) was a French microbiologist, Jewish Community pioneer, leader, writer, and lecturer.

== Early life and education ==
Liliane Ackermann was born on September 3, 1938, in Strasbourg, France, the daughter of Lucien Weil and Béatrice Haas. During World War II, her family took refuge in Voiron, Isère. They would remain there until 1956, when they moved back to Strasbourg.

After her Baccalauréat in 1956, she studied at the Faculty of Sciences at the Université Louis Pasteur of Strasbourg, where she obtained her first Ph.D. (in microbiology), in 1974. She later received a second Ph.D., at the Université de Strasbourg (Humanities), in 1999.

She married Henri Ackermann, a dentist and a community activist, in 1959. They had seven children (Théo, Jacqui, Anne, Raoul, Eric, Charles, and Marc). Henri and Liliane Ackermann formed a team, for nearly half a century.

From 1956 to 2007, she taught in Strasbourg at the elementary and secondary levels but also to adults in Jewish education. She taught also to Russian immigrants in Germany. In parallel, from 1976 to 1996, she gave lectures at the Louis Pasteur University in biochemistry and microbiology.

== Career ==
Liliane and Henri Ackermann took charge in 1972 of the Youth Movement "Yeshurun" [in French written "Yechouroun"], a national religious group active all year round, and with winter and summer camps. A great number of Jewish leaders were formed there. Among them, René Gutman, Chief Rabbi of the Bas-Rhin, Gilles Bernheim, Chief Rabbi of the Synagogue de la Rue de la Victoire in Paris, Chief Rabbi of France from January 1, 2009, to April 11, 2013, and many others.

On February 1, 2009, at his Inauguration as Chief Rabbi of France, Gilles Bernheim recalled in his speech Liliane Ackermann: "I want to express what I owe to the leaders of the youth movement Yechouroun from which I come. Théo and Edith Klein of blessed memory, Liliane Ackermann of blessed memory and the friend so close to me, Henri Ackermann."

Liliane Ackermann got involved in reaching out to handicapped, women in distress, the elderly. In Strasbourg, her home was the locale to find counseling, advice, encouragement, but also serious learning at all levels.

She was a scientist by formation but also an accomplished artist: she played the violin and piano, and loved to draw.

A rarity for a woman, anywhere, but particularly in France, she learned on her own the Babylonian Talmud, and went on to study, thereafter, the Jerusalem Talmud.

On an official occasion, at the Palais de l'Elysée, in Paris, meeting the President of France, Valéry Giscard d'Estaing, she introduced herself, listing her credentials, and concluded: "and I also educate my 7 children."

At the age of 68, she died in Strasbourg, on February 3, 2007.

== Bibliography ==
- "Judaism and Science"
- "Judaism and Women"
- "Judaism and Conversion".
