= René Gutman =

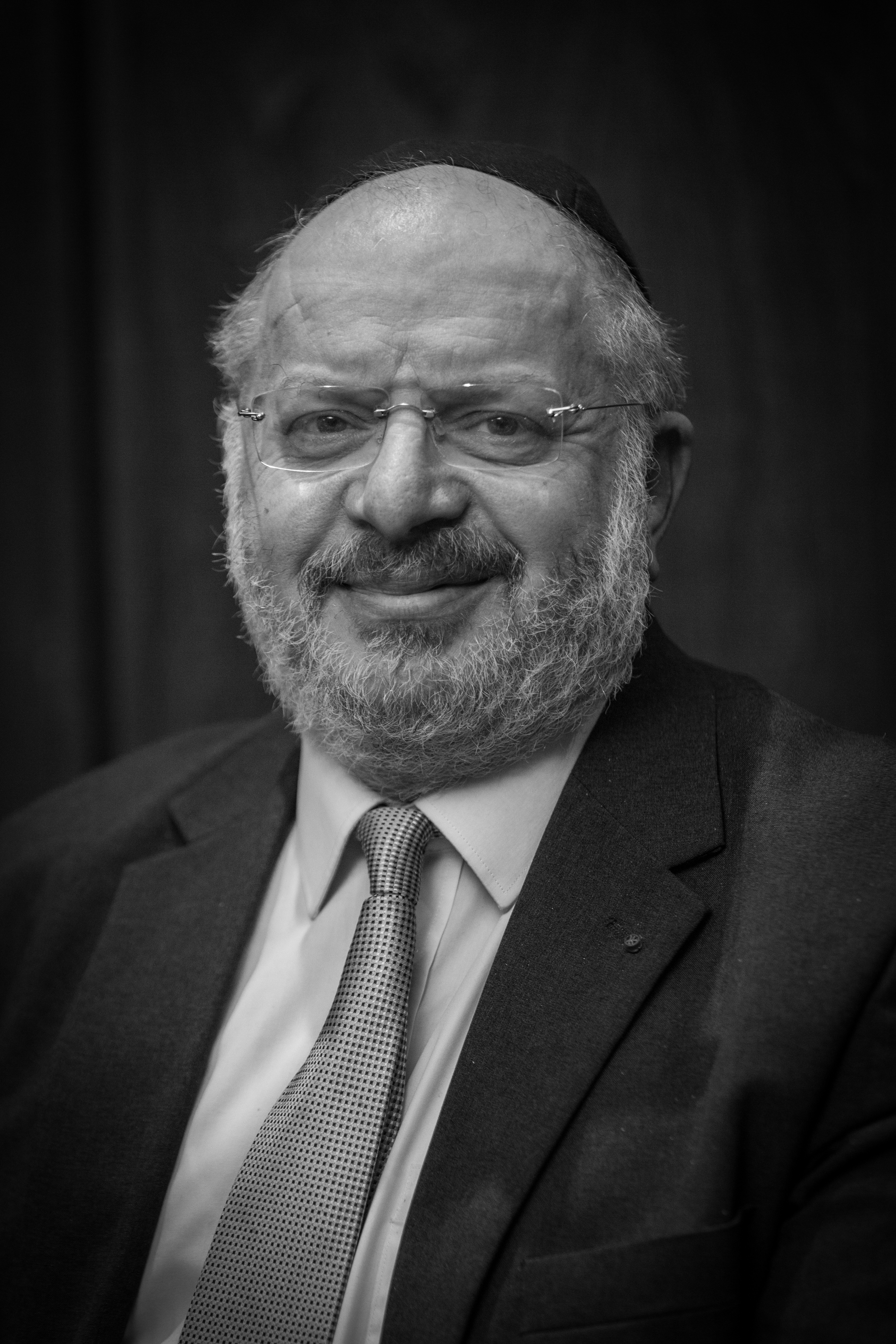
René Gutman, 2015.

René Gutman (born in Rouen in 1950) was Chief Rabbi of Strasbourg from 1987 to 2017.

== Biography ==
René Gutman grew up in Rouen, where his father Alexandre Gutman was the local rabbi. He spent several years in Israel, dedicating himself to religious studies, at the Yeshiva of Tifra'h ישיבת תושיה, in the Negev, and after then in 'Hebron' (Slabodka yeshiva) in Jerusalem.

He took rabbinic studies at the French Jewish Seminar in Paris, and meanwhile started academic studies in the university. He graduated Rabbi in 1977, by winning the Grand Rabbin Lieber grant (1974) and the André Weil grant, three consecutive years. During this period he joined the religious youth movement Yeshouroun under the direction of Henri and Liliane Ackermann, among several future leaders of the French rabbinate. He has been successively rabbi of the city of Reims, Besançon, then Chief Rabbi of Brussels and finally in the Jewish community of Strasbourg and Lower Rhine, as successor to Rabbi Max Warschawski.

Gutman holds a Ph.D. in religious studies at the Ecole Pratique des Hautes Etudes (Sorbonne University) where he attended the seminar of Rabbi Charles Touati on Talmudic and Rabbinic Judaism. Former member of the National Ethics Council on AIDS, Permanent Representative of the Conference of European Rabbis at the Council of Europe, he also participates in inter-religious dialogue. He also acts for dialogue beyond the Monotheistic Religions and met with religious representatives from the Far East (Religions for Peace, "Hommes de Parole", 2007 Kyoto Conference ).

The French Government appointed him Knight in the Légion d'Honneur in 1999 then Officer in 2008, in 2005 he has been appointed officer of the Ordre national du Mérite.

After his retirement, Gutman moved to Israel.
