= Joseph Sitruk =

Rabbi Joseph Haïm Sitruk
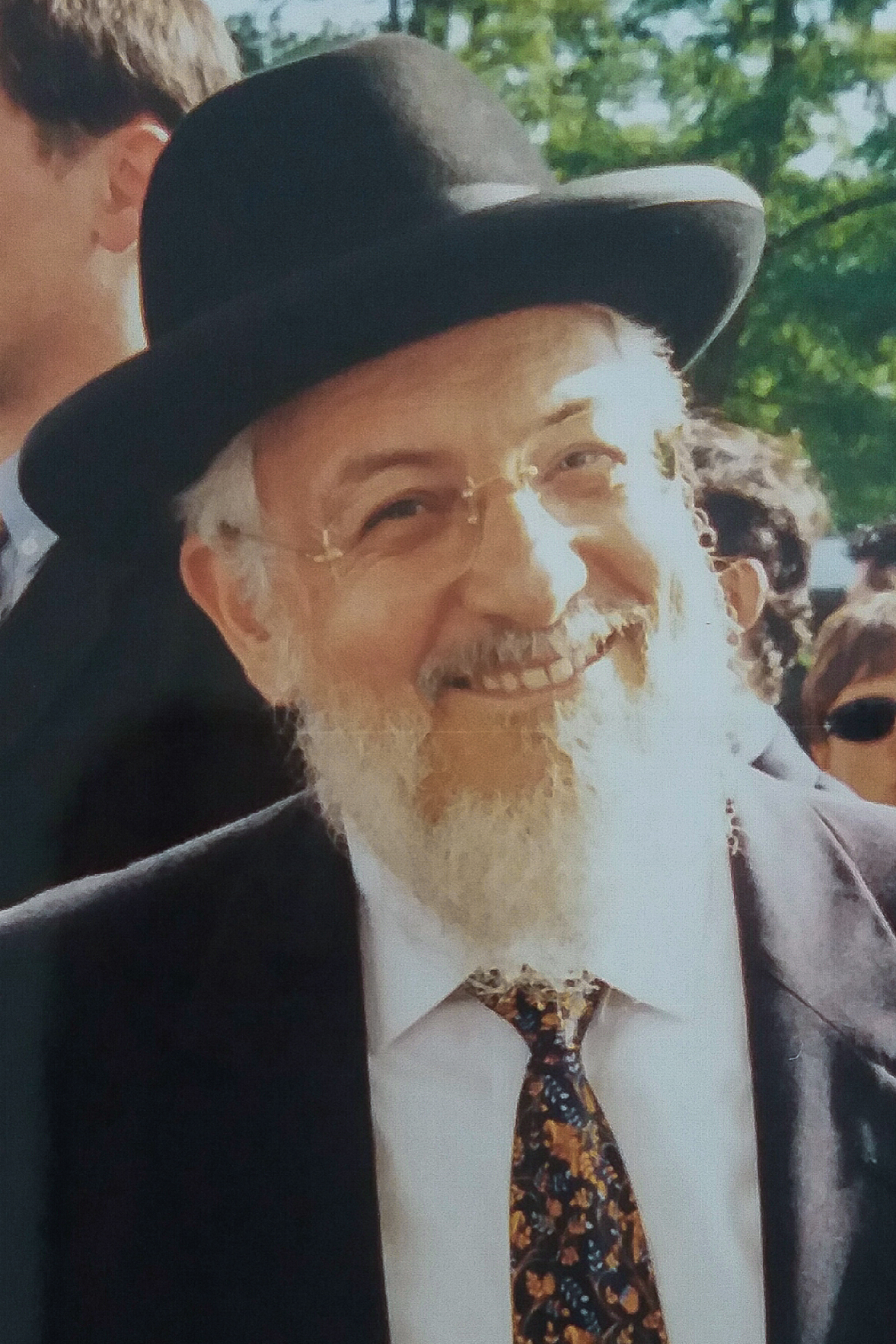
- Joseph Sitruk in 1999.
- Title: Chief Rabbi of France

Personal life
- Born: 17 October 1944 Tunis, French Tunisia
- Died: 25 September 2016 (aged 71) Paris, France

Religious life
- Religion: Judaism
- Denomination: Orthodox

Jewish leader
- Predecessor: René-Samuel Sirat
- Successor: Gilles Bernheim
- Position: Chief Rabbi
- Organization: Rabbinate of France
- Began: June 1987
- Ended: 22 June 2008
- Other: Rabbi of Strasbourg, Chief Rabbi of Marseille, President of the Conference of European Rabbis
- Residence: Paris

Joseph Haïm Sitruk (Hebrew: יוסף סיטרוק; 16 October 1944 – 25 September 2016) was a former Chief Rabbi of France, a position he held from June 1987 to 22 June 2008. Born Joseph Sitruk in Tunis, after suffering a stroke in 2001 and recovering he added the name "Haim" to his name in line with Jewish tradition.

Sitruk graduated as a rabbi in 1970 following his studies in a rabbinical school, and was named Rabbi of Strasbourg before becoming the assistant of the Chief Rabbi Max Warchawski.

In 1975, Sitruk became Chief Rabbi of Marseille. In 1987 he was elected to occupy the post of Chief Rabbi of France. He was then re-elected for two more seven-year terms.

On 16 March 2007, Sitruk was selected as a Commander of the Legion of Honor.

Sitruk lost his bid for re-election as Chief Rabbi of France on 22 June 2008, against Rabbi Gilles Bernheim, who had previously run against him on the 1994 Chief Rabbinate elections and failed.

Sitruk was Orthodox. Though he may not have held religious and moral authority over all Jews in France, his charisma earned him a certain reverence, especially among Sephardi Jews. He was married and the father of nine children. He was also the president of the Conference of European Rabbis.

Sitruk died on 25 September 2016 at the age of 71.
