= Seth Schwartz =

American historian

Seth Schwartz is an American historian and the Lucius N. Littauer Professor of Classical Jewish Civilization at Columbia University. Schwartz earned a B.A. from Yeshiva University in 1979, and a Ph.D. from Columbia University in 1985.

== Biography ==
Seth Schwartz received his B.A. in Classics from Yeshiva University in 1979, and his Ph.D. in ancient history from Columbia in 1985. He taught at Dropsie College in its final year and subsequently was a Golda Meir Fellow at Hebrew University, and a junior fellow at the Harvard Society of Fellows, assistant professor of History at University of Rhode Island, and, from 1992, a senior research fellow at King’s College, Cambridge. He resigned his fellowship in 1995 to return to New York and taught at JTS before moving to Columbia in 2009. He held a Guggenheim Fellowship in 1999-2000, and was a member of the Institute for Advanced Studies in Jerusalem in 2002/3, and of the Institute for Advanced Study in Princeton, and an NEH fellow, in 2006/7.

== Books ==
- The Ancient Jews from Alexander to Muhammad, Cambridge: Cambridge University Press, 2014
- Were the Jews A Mediterranean Society: Reciprocity and Solidarity in Ancient Judaism, Princeton: Princeton University Press, 2010.
- Imperialism and Jewish Society, 200 BCE to 640 CE, Princeton: Princeton University Press, 2001.
- Josephus and Judaean Politics, Leiden: Brill, 1990.
- With R. Bagnall, A. Cameron and K. Worp, Consuls of the Later Roman Empire, Atlanta: Scholars Press, 1987.

== Awards ==
2001: National Jewish Book Award in Scholarship for Imperialism and Jewish Society: 200 B.C.E. to 640 C.E.
