= Michel Gugenheim =

Michel Gugenheim is the Chief Rabbi of Paris. He also assumed the position of interim Chief Rabbi of France in 2013 after the resignation of Gilles Bernheim, the previous Chief Rabbi of France and remained in that position until the election of Rabbi Haim Korsia.

L'Express publicized a secret video recording alleging Gugenheim's participation extorting $120,000 from a woman in exchange for a get document. Gugenheim denies the allegations.

On 13 July 2014 Gugenheim was in Synagogue Don Isaac Abravanel when it came under attack from pro-Palestinian and was rescued alongside other worshippers.
