= Ely Merzbach =

Israeli mathematician

- עלי מרצבך
- Merzbach in 2010
- Born: February 11, 1950 (age 76); Paris, France
- Education: Hebrew University of Jerusalem; Ben-Gurion University of the Negev
- Scientific career
- Fields: Probability theory, stochastic processes
- Workplaces: Bar-Ilan University
- Thesis: Multi-parameter stochastic processes and martingales (1979)
- Doctoral advisor: Giacomo Della Riccia

Ely Yissachar Merzbach (Hebrew: עלי יששכר מרצבך; born 11 February 1950) is an Israeli mathematician and emeritus professor at Bar-Ilan University's Department of Mathematics and the Gonda Brain Research Center.

== Biography ==
Ely Merzbach was born in 1950 in Paris, where he attended École Yabné. He immigrated to Israel at the age of 17, studying for a year at Yeshivat Be'er Ya'akov and then enlisting in the Nahal Brigade of the Israel Defense Forces. He obtained a B.Sc. in mathematics and statistics and an M.Sc. in mathematics from the Hebrew University of Jerusalem, and completed his doctoral studies in 1979 at Ben-Gurion University of the Negev.

== Academic career ==
After working as a postdoctoral fellow at Paris 6 and the École Polytechnique, Merzbach joined the faculty at Bar-Ilan University in 1980, becoming full professor in 1993.

His research focuses on point processes theory, measure theory, stochastic geometry, and applications thereof.

He served as head of the Bar-Ilan's Department of Mathematics and Computer Science from 1991, academic head of Ariel University from 1996 to 1997, and was elected dean of the Faculty of Exact Sciences at Bar-Ilan in 1997. Since April 2021 he has served as president of Michlalah-Jerusalem College.
