= Haïm Korsia =

French rabbi

Grand rabbin Haïm Korsia
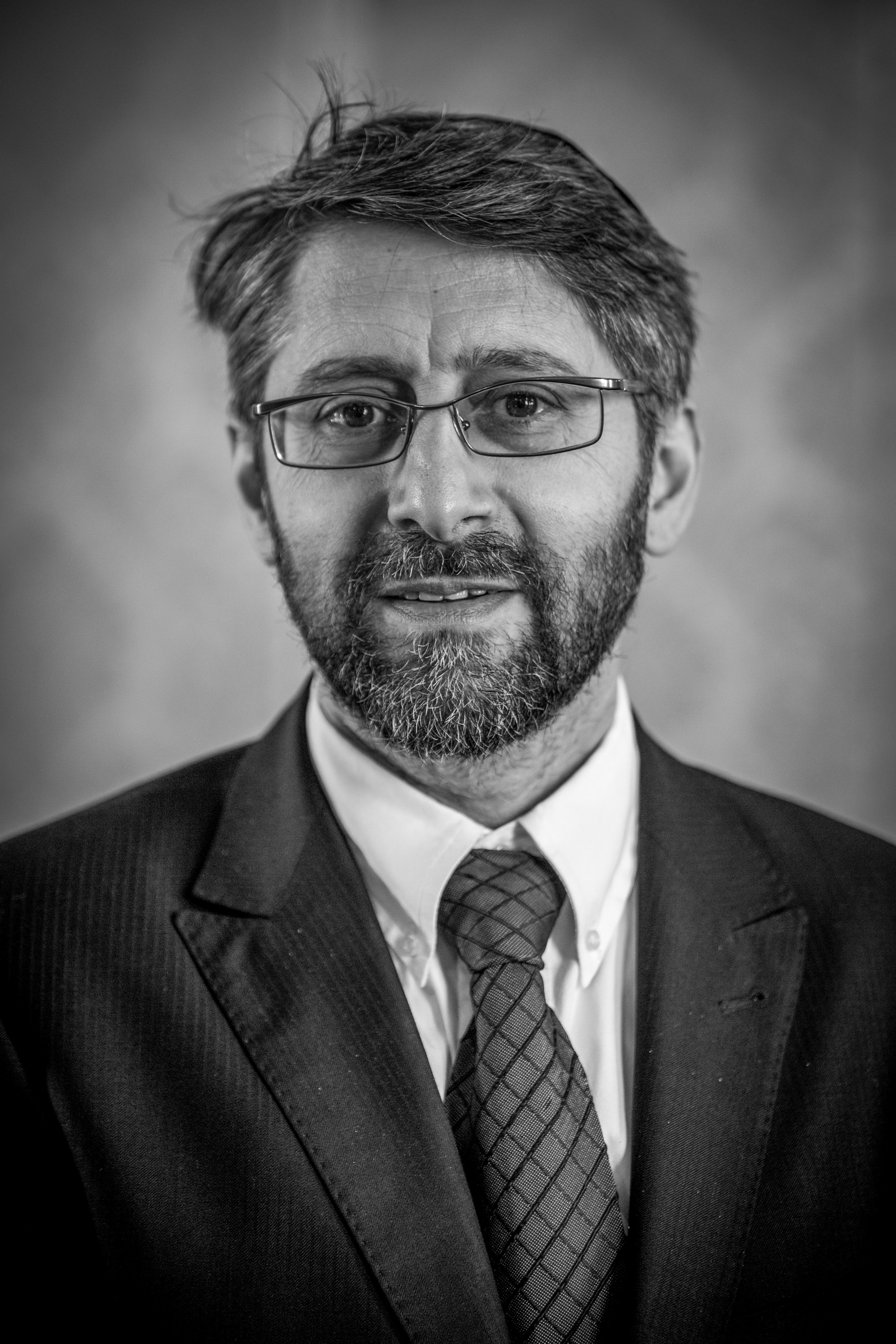
- Haïm Korsia in 2014.
- Title: Chief Rabbi of France

Personal life
- Born: 27 September 1963 (age 63) Lyon, France
- Education: Master of Business Administration (Reims Management School); Master of Advanced Studies (École pratique des hautes études) (French Institute of Advanced Studies of Homeland Security) (Centre for Advanced Studies on Africa and modern Asia); PhD in contemporary history (University of Poitiers)

Religious life
- Religion: Judaism

Jewish leader
- Predecessor: Gilles Bernheim
- Yeshiva: Séminaire israélite de France
- Organisation: Central Consistory of France
- Began: 22 June 2014

Haïm Korsia (born 27 September 1963) is the Chief Rabbi of France. He was elected by the Central Consistory.

Already serving as Jewish chaplain of the French army, Korsia was also head of a rabbinical school. He was elected in June 2014 and began a seven-year term as the leader of France's Jewish community.

== Early life and education ==
Haïm Korsia was born in Lyon, France, to Sephardi Jewish parents who had immigrated from Algeria. His father was a prominent rabbi in the city. He attended Jewish schools. Korsia has earned several advanced degrees: Master of Business Administration at Reims Management School; Master of Advanced Studies, École pratique des hautes études; and a PhD in contemporary history from University of Poitiers. He has also studied at the French Institute of Advanced Studies of Homeland Security; and the Centre for Advanced Studies on Africa and modern Asia.

== Career ==
Korsia served as a rabbi in France for more than two decades. He became head of a rabbinical school in Paris. In addition, he was appointed to serve as Jewish chaplain of the French army.

He was elected as a member of the Central Consistory, representing Jewish congregations across the country.

In 2021, he, alongside a significant cohort of other rabbis and Jewish community leaders, accused far-right presidential candidate Éric Zemmour of being an antisemite, despite Zemmour himself being Jewish.

== Role of Chief Rabbi ==
In April 2014 Rabbi Gilles Bernheim resigned from the position as Chief Rabbi of France. He was implicated in a scandal involving accusations of plagiarism. "Bernheim admitted that he had plagiarized in two books and an essay as well as claimed unearned academic titles."

Rabbi Olivier Kaufmann and Rabbi Haïm Korsia each served for a period as interim chief rabbi. In June 2014, members of a committee of the Central Consistory elected Korsia as Chief Rabbi of France in a 131–97 vote. The Chief Rabbi serves for a seven-year term.

Martine Cohen, an expert on Judaism at the National Center for Scientific Research in Paris, noted that Korsia's election as the chief rabbi represented a shift to a more "Modern Orthodoxy" compared to the previous conservative leanings of the Jewish Orthodox establishment.

Korsia began his new position at a time of difficulty for the French Jewish community, which is the largest Jewish community in Europe, and third after those of Israel and the United States. Since the turn of the 21st century, there has been a rise in anti-Semitic activity in France, some associated with international issues, such as the Second Intifada and other tensions in Israel/Palestine territories; economic problems for some in the community; increased emigration to Israel; and corruption among some Jewish leaders.

Korsia has embraced a more liberal position in relation to Jews born to non-Jewish mothers and Jewish fathers, calling them "seed of Israel". According to Orthodox standards, they are not considered legally Jews and would have to go through a formal conversion process to be accepted by Orthodox rabbis.

He also appears to be concerned about women's issues. He announced directives supportive of women who have been refused a "get" or Jewish divorce by their husbands. Shortly after assuming his new role, Korsia appointed Dolly Touitou to a new position to address complaints filed against the French Jewish religious services organization. Observers consider that an egalitarian action that was supportive of women's rights, and considered "bold" by the majority Sephardic Jewish community. Prior to 1990, women were not allowed to vote in Consistoire elections. They were also prohibited from standing for office until 2006, following a ruling by the French courts that struck down the prohibition.

In the wake of a series of terrorist attacks in France by Muslim extremists in January 2015, in which some victims were Jewish, Rabbi Korsia called on the Jewish community to help invigorate French society's concept of fraternité (brotherhood). He rejected the idea that the solution to such attacks is emigration or capitulation. He likened current difficulties to those faced by Moses and his followers at the Red Sea: "Sometimes the only way is to enter the Red Sea – to go in and rebuild a new solidarity, rebuild links between Christians, Protestant, Catholics, Muslims, and Jews, and rebuild hope", said Korsia.

British-based news website Middle East Eye and Israeli site YNet reported that Korsia in an August 2024 BFM TV interview had urged Israel to "finish the job", and had said that violence in Gaza was "an act of war that no country in the world would conduct like Israel is doing, and I have absolutely nothing to be ashamed of in how Israel is conducting the fighting."[sic]

== Honors and awards ==
- Commander of the Order of Legion of Honour

== Works ==
- Être Juif et Français : Jacob Kaplan, le rabbin de la République, Broché, Editeur : Editions Privé, 2006, ISBN 978-2-35076-023-0
- À corps et à Toi, Broché, Editeur : Actes Sud, Collection : Le souffle de l'esprit, 2006, ISBN 978-2-7427-6497-6
- La Kabbale pour débutants, Broché, Editeur : Trajectoire, 2007, ISBN 978-2-84197-423-8
