= Charles Mopsik =

French author

Charles Mopsik (2 September 1956 – 13 June 2003) was a French thinker, researcher and writer who renewed the study of the Kabbalah and of Jewish mysticism.

== Biography ==
He was one of the important figures in the revival of Jewish studies in France at the end of the 1970s, a revival characterized by its philosophical consequences. In 1979, he founded the book collection "Les dix paroles" (The ten words) published by Editions Verdier, with Maimonides's Guide des égarés (The Guide for the Perplexed) as the first emblematic volume, followed by a translation from the Aramaic of the Book of Genesis in the Zohar.

A student of Jean Zacklad (1929–1990), he was himself initiated into Kabbalah by Rav Levi Saadia Nahmani. He specialized in the study of Jewish mystagogical and theurgic traditions which developed in Spain and Provence from the 12th century and 13th century. He defended his doctorate in philosophy at the University of Paris I in 1987, with his thesis Recherches autour de la Lettre sur la sainteté: Sources, texte, influences (Research into the Letter on Holiness: Sources, Text, Influences), under the direction of Pierre Thillet, a specialist in the Peripatetic tradition.

As a translator, an historian and a researcher, Charles Mopsik was a major figure in the study of the Kabbalah.

He died at the age of 46 following a serious illness. The Charles Mopsik Association was created after his death with the aim of preserving his memory and promoting his work.

== Selected works ==
- (with Claude Birman & Jean Zacklad), Caïn et Abel: Aux origines de la violence. Paris: Grasset, 1980.
- La Cabale, lire au-delà de la lettre. Paris: Jacques Grancher, 1988.
- Les grands textes de la cabale: les rites qui font Dieu. Lagrasse: Verdier, 1993.
- Cabale et cabalistes. Paris: Bayard, 1997.
- Le Sexe des âmes: Aléas de la différence sexuelle dans la cabale. Paris-Tel Aviv: L’Éclat, 2003.
  - English translation: Sex of the soul: the vicissitudes of sexual difference in the Kabbalah. Los Angeles, Cal.: Cherub Press, 2005.
- Chemins de la cabale: Vingt-cinq études sur la mystique juive. Paris-Tel Aviv: L’Éclat, 2004.
- Les Deux visages de l'Un: Le couple divin dans la Cabale. Paris: Albin Michel, 2024.
