= Gilles Bernheim =

French rabbi

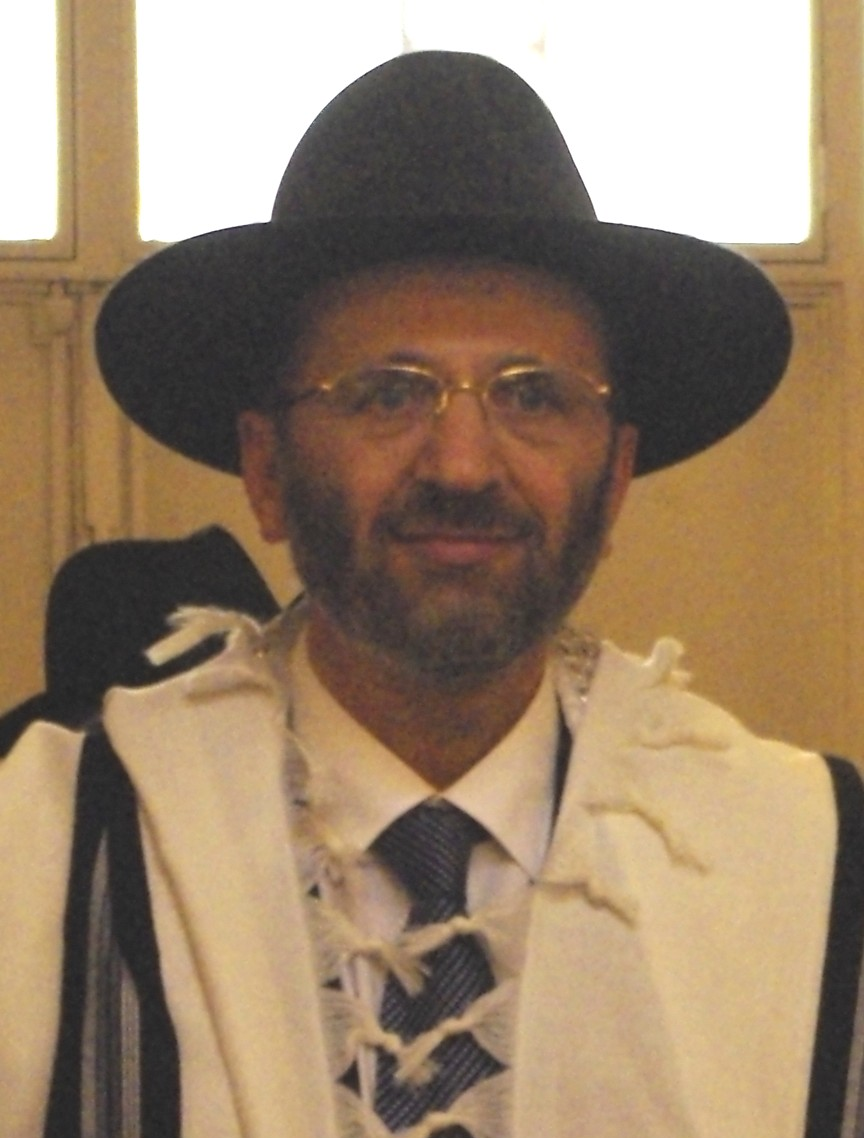
- Bernheim in 2009
- Born: Gilles Uriel Bernheim; 30 May 1952 (age 74); Aix-les-Bains, France
- Occupation: Chief Rabbi of France
- Predecessor: Joseph Sitruk
- Successor: Haïm Korsia

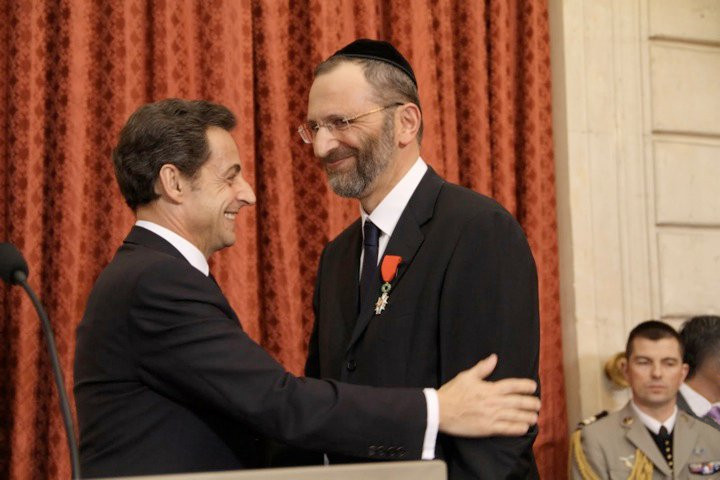
Bernheim receives the Légion d'honneur in 2009

Gilles Uriel Bernheim (French pronunciation: [ʒil y.ʁjɛl bɛʁ.nɛm]; born 30 May 1952) is a French-Israeli rabbi who was formerly the Chief Rabbi of France. Born in Aix-les-Bains, Savoie, in 1952, he was elected by the general assembly of the Central Consistory chief rabbi of France on 22 June 2008, for a seven-year mandate starting from 1 January 2009. Until then, he had been rabbi of synagogue de la Victoire, the main synagogue in Paris, since 1 May 1997. The Chief Rabbi of France was respected as a scholar not only in the Jewish community but in the wider academic world. However, he resigned as chief rabbi in April 2013 before his term had ended, amid revelations of plagiarism and deception about his academic credentials.

He succeeded chief rabbi Joseph Sitruk. He was very critical of the lifting of the excommunication of bishop Richard Williamson.

The French Government appointed him Knight [Chevalier] in the Légion d'honneur, on 10 April 2009.

== Career as chief rabbi ==
In October 2012, he took a clear position against gay marriage in a plagiarized essay entitled "Mariage homosexuel, homoparentalité et adoption : ce que l’on oublie souvent de dire" (approximately equivalent to "Gay marriage, gay parenting and adoption: What we frequently forget to mention" in English)

« The problem in the proposed legislation, the harm it would cause to our entire society for the sole benefit of a tiny minority, once they have irreversibly blurred three things:

- the genealogical substituents of parenthood in paternity and maternity,
- the status of the child, shifts to being subject to that of an object to which anyone is entitled,
- identities where naturally given sexual differentiation would be forced to give way to the orientation expressed by each in the name of countering inequality, twisted into the eradication of differences. »

This essay found a strong echo in Roman Catholic circles, culminating in Pope Benedict XVI quoting him at length in his annual address to the Roman Curia, 21 December 2012

"The Chief Rabbi of France, Gilles Bernheim, has shown in a very detailed and profoundly moving study that the attack we are currently experiencing on the true structure of the family, made up of father, mother, and child, goes much deeper."

== Personal ==
Bernheim's father was a wood seller and died when Bernheim was 14. His mother, Berthe (Blime), née Klein, is a former pupil of Antoinette Feuerwerker and was a teacher of mathematics. His wife is a psychoanalyst, and he is the father of four children.

Gilles Bernheim was a student of Séminaire israélite de France in Paris.

In December 2020, Bernheim emigrated to Israel to join his children and grandchildren living there.

== Plagiarism and qualification scandal ==
The affair started in early March when the Strass de la Philosophie blog revealed that a passage on hasidic exegesis from Bernheim’s work was almost identical to an interview of the philosopher Jean-Francois Lyotard that appears in the 1996 book "Questioning Judaism" by Elisabeth Weber.

Bernheim acknowledged that his 2011 book "40 Jewish Meditations" contained one passage that his ghostwriter plagiarized without Bernheim’s knowledge. "I have been fooled," he wrote. "However, I am responsible. I apologize to the authors whose texts have been copied, to the people who have read these 'meditations' and to my publisher who was not informed of the existence of an outsider." It was also revealed that he did not actually qualify for the prestigious title of "agrégé of philosophy" that had often been attributed to him. The agrégé title required passing a rigorous examination that was necessary for becoming a professor of philosophy. While he may not have directly claimed to hold that qualification, he had allowed others to refer to him using the title without clarifying his actual status.

Le Figaro reported that "there was heavy pressure" on the part of unnamed officials from the Jewish community for Bernheim to resign. On 11 April 2013 he resigned as chief rabbi.

== Publications ==
- Un Rabbin dans la Cité, Calmann-Levy, 1997
- Le Souci des Autres au fondement de la loi juive, Calmann-Levy, 2002
- Réponses juives aux défis d'aujourd'hui, Textuel, 2003
- Le rabbin et le cardinal, Stock, 2008. Avec le cardinal Philippe Barbarin, prix Spiritualités d'Aujourd'hui 2008
- N'oublions pas de penser la France, Stock, 2012
