= Abraham Vita de Cologna =

French rabbi

Grand rabbin Abraham Vita de Cologna
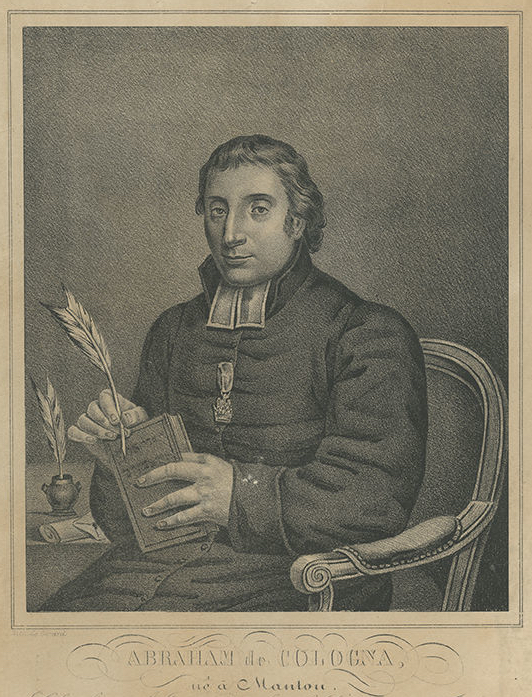
- Title: Chief Rabbi of France

Personal life
- Born: 25 September 1755 Mantua, Duchy of Mantua, Habsburg Empire
- Died: 24 March 1832 Trieste, Holy Roman Empire

Religious life
- Religion: Judaism

Jewish leader
- Predecessor: David Sintzheim
- Successor: Emmanuel Deutz
- Organisation: Central Consistory of France
- Began: 1812
- Ended: 1826

Abraham (Vita) de Cologna (25 September 1755 – 24 March 1832) was an Italian-born orator, politician, and religious leader. He is considered to have been one of the first Chief Rabbis of France, following David Sintzheim and preceding Emmanuel Deutz.

== Biography ==
As the rabbi of Mantua, Abraham Vita de Cologna was elected as a deputy to the parliament of the Kingdom of Italy, which was ruled in personal union with France under Napoleon I, and in 1806 he served as a member of the Assembly of Jewish Notables in Paris. He was later named vice-president of the Grand Sanhedrin when it was established in 1807. In 1808 he became a member of the Central Consistory of France, and subsequently served as its president from 1812 to 1826. Having presided over the French Central Consistory, he is considered to have been the second Chief Rabbi of France, David Sintzheim having been the first. He later served as a member of the Consistory of Turin as well.

His legacy includes a collection of sermons and essays authored by him.

== See also ==
- Napoleon and the Jews
