= Louis-Mathieu Molé =

French statesman (1781–1855)

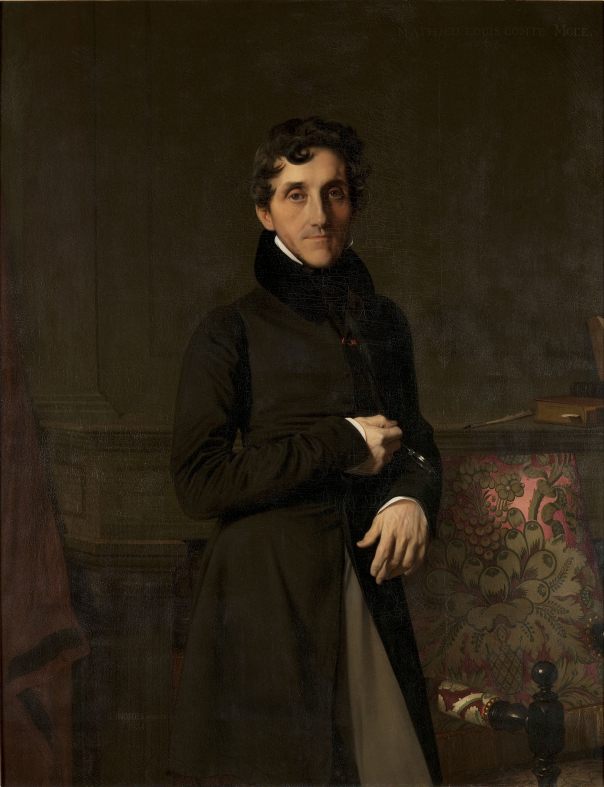
- Portrait of Louis-Mathieu Molé by Jean-Auguste-Dominique Ingres, 1834

Prime Minister of France
- In office 6 September 1836 – 31 March 1839
- Monarch: Louis Philippe I
- Preceded by: Adolphe Thiers
- Succeeded by: Jean-de-Dieu Soult

Minister of Foreign Affairs
- In office 11 August 1830 – 2 November 1830
- Monarch: Louis Philippe I
- Preceded by: Jean-Baptiste Jourdan
- Succeeded by: Nicolas Joseph Maison

Minister of the Navy and Colonies
- In office 12 September 1817 – 29 December 1818
- Monarch: Louis XVIII
- Prime Minister: The Duke of Richelieu
- Preceded by: Laurent de Gouvion Saint-Cyr
- Succeeded by: Pierre-Barthélémy d'Albarèdes

Minister of Justice
- In office 20 November 1813 – 1 April 1814
- Monarch: Napoleon I
- Preceded by: Claude Ambroise Régnier
- Succeeded by: Pierre Henrion de Pansey

Personal details
- Born: 24 January 1781 Paris, France
- Died: 23 November 1855 (aged 74) Épinay-Champlâtreux, Val-d'Oise, French Empire
- Party: Nonpartisan (1806–15; 1830–48); Doctrinaire (1815–1830)
- Spouse: Caroline-Joséphine de La Live (m. 1798; died 1845)
- Children: Clotilde and Élisabeth
- Profession: Writer, diplomat

Louis-Mathieu, comte Molé (French: [lwi matjø kɔ̃t mɔle]; 24 January 1781 – 23 November 1855) was a French statesman and a close friend and associate of Louis Philippe I, King of the French during the July Monarchy (1830–1848).

== Biography ==
Molé was born in Paris. His father, a president of the parlement of Paris, who came of the family of the famous president noted below, was guillotined during the Terror. Count Molé's early days were spent in Switzerland and in England with his mother, a relative of Lamoignon-Malesherbes.

On his return to France, he studied at the Ecole Centrale des Travaux Publics, and his social education was accomplished in the salon of Pauline de Beaumont, the friend of Châteaubriand and Joubert. A volume of Essais de morale et de politique introduced him to the notice of Napoleon, who attached him to the staff of the council of state. He became master of requests in 1806, and next year prefect of the Côte-d'Or, Councillor of State and Director-General of Bridges and Roads in 1809, and Count of the Empire in the autumn of the same year.

He served as Napoleon's advisor on Jewish affairs and was heavily involved with Napoleon's gathering of a Jewish Grand Sanhedrin in 1807. Mole initially did not support Jewish emancipation, though he seems to have moderated his position over the course of his involvement with the Sanhedrin and particularly Abraham Furtado.

In November 1813, he became Minister of Justice. Although he resumed his functions as Director-General during the Hundred Days, he excused himself from taking his seat in the Council of State and was apparently not seriously compromised, for Louis XVIII confirmed his appointment as Director-General and made him a peer of France. Molé supported the policy of the duc de Richelieu, who in 1817 entrusted to him the direction of the Ministry of Marine, which he held until December 1818.

From that time, he belonged to the moderate opposition, and he accepted the result of the revolution of 1830 without enthusiasm. He was Minister of Foreign Affairs in the first cabinet of Louis-Philippe I's reign, and was confronted with the task of reconciling the European powers to the change of government. The real direction of foreign affairs, however, lay less in his hands than in those of Talleyrand, who had gone to London as the ambassador of the new king.

After a few months in office, Molé retired, and it was not until 1836 that the fall of Thiers led to his becoming Prime Minister of a new government, in which he held the portfolio of foreign affairs. One of his first actions was the release of the ex-ministers of Charles X, and he had to deal with the disputes with Switzerland and with the Strasburg coup of Louis-Napoléon. He withdrew the French garrison from Ancona, but pursued an active policy in Mexico and in Algeria.

Personal and political differences rapidly arose between Molé and his chief colleague, Guizot, and led to an open rupture in March 1837 in face of the general opposition to a grant to the duc de Nemours. After some attempts to secure a new combination, Molé reconstructed his ministry in April, Guizot being excluded. The general election in the autumn gave him no fresh support in the Chamber of Deputies, while he had now to face a formidable coalition between Guizot, the Left Centre under Thiers, and politicians of the Dynastic Left and the Republican Left. Molé, supported by Louis Philippe, held his ground against the general hostility until the beginning of 1839, when, after acrid discussions on the address, the chamber was dissolved. The new house showed little change in the strength of parties, but Molé resigned on 31 March 1839.

A year later he was elected to the Académie française, and though he continued to speak frequently, he took no important share in party politics. Louis Philippe sought his help in his vain efforts to form a ministry in February 1848. After the revolution, he was deputy for the Gironde to the Constituent Assembly, and in 1849 to the Legislative Assembly, where he was one of the leaders of the Right until the coup d'état on 2 December 1851 drove him from public life.

He died in the family home at Château de Champlâtreux in Épinay (Seine-et-Oise) on 23 November 1855 and was buried in the little church of the village.

Political offices
Preceded by Adolphe Thiers	Prime Minister of France; 1836–1839	Succeeded by Jean-de-Dieu Soult
Preceded by François Guizot	Prime Minister of France; 1848	Succeeded by Adolphe Thiers
Preceded by Adolphe Thiers	Minister of Foreign Affairs; 6 September 1836 – 31 March 1839	Succeeded by Louis Napoléon Lannes
Preceded by Laurent de Gouvion Saint-Cyr	Ministers of Marine and the Colonies; 12 September 1817 – 29 December 1818	Succeeded by Pierre-Barthélémy Portal d'Albarèdes
