= Deutz =

Deutz may refer to:

== People ==
- Emmanuel Deutz (1763–1842), German-born French rabbi
- Rupert of Deutz, (c. 1075–c. 1129), Benedictine theologian and writer
- Simon Deutz (1802–1852), German-born French courtier

== Places ==
- Deutz, Cologne, a former town, since 1888 a quarter of Cologne, Germany
- Deutz Abbey, a Benedictine abbey in Cologne, Germany
- Deutz–Gießen railway, a line between Deutz and Gießen
- Deutz Station, after 2004 Köln Messe/Deutz station, a railway junction in Cologne, Germany.
- Deutz Suspension Bridge, former bridge in Cologne destroyed in World War II.

== Companies ==
- Deutz AG, a diesel-engine manufacturer based in Cologne, Germany
  - Deutz-Allis, former subsidiary in North America.
  - Deutz-Fahr, a brand of tractors and other farm equipment established in 1968.
  - Deutz Power Systems, former subsidiary (1985–2007) today part of Caterpillar Energy Solutions.
- Deutz (wine), a champagne bottler based in France, also known as Deutz Geldermann
