= Joseph David Sinzheim =

Chief rabbi of Strasbourg (1745–1812)

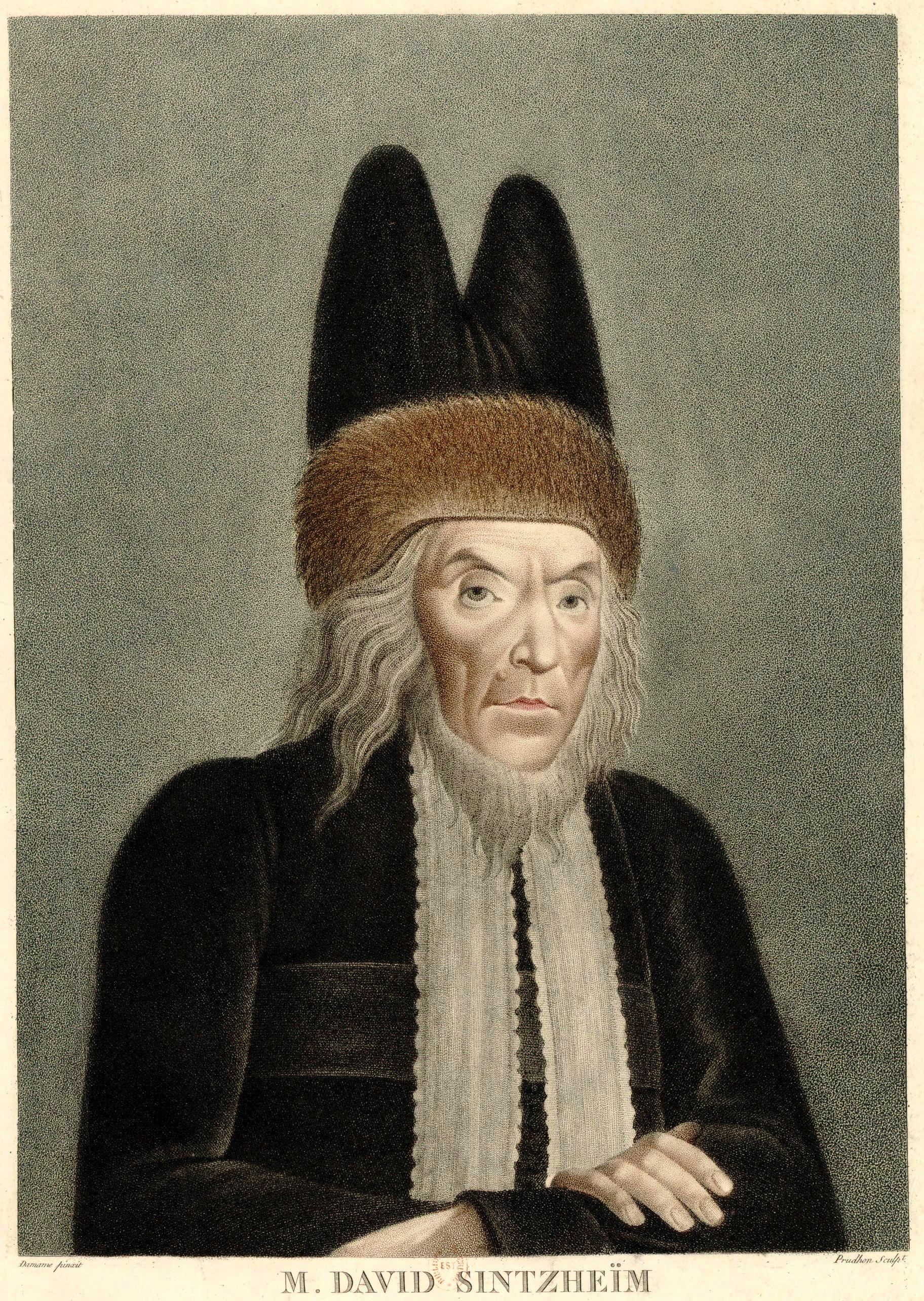
- Title: Chief Rabbi of Strasbourg

Personal life
- Born: 16 November 1745 Trier
- Died: November 11, 1812 (aged 66) Paris
- Parent: Rabbi Isaac Sinzheim of Treves

Religious life
- Religion: Judaism
- Denomination: Orthodox
- Other: President of the Grand Sanhedrin

Joseph David Sinzheim (1745 – November 11, 1812 in Paris) was the chief rabbi of Strasbourg. He was son of Rabbi Isaac Sinzheim of Treves, and brother-in-law of Herz Cerfbeer.

== Biography ==
Sinzheim was the most learned and prominent member of the Assembly of Notables convened by Napoleon on May 30, 1806. The task of answering the questions laid before the assembly by the imperial commissioner was entrusted to Sinzheim, who fulfilled his duties (July 30-August 3, 1806) to the satisfaction of the assembly as well as of the commissioner and even of Napoleon himself. The German sermon which he delivered in the synagogue of Paris in honor of the emperor's birthday, on August 15, also strengthened Napoleon's favorable opinion of the Jews, who received the imperial promise that their rights as French citizens should not be withdrawn.

On February 9, 1807, four days after the Assembly of Notables was dissolved, the Grand Sanhedrin was convened; its chairman ("nasi"), appointed by the minister of the interior, was Sinzheim, who had probably suggested the assembly, having been frequently consulted by the imperial commissioner. The consistorial constitution, provided by the decree of March 17, 1808, opened a new field of activity for Sinzheim, who was elected chairman of the Central Consistory of France. He was regarded as the foremost French Talmudist of his time, and was the author of the Yad David, which has recently been printed in its entirety by Machon Yerushalayim.
