= Pierre Paul Nicolas Henrion de Pansey =

French jurist and politician

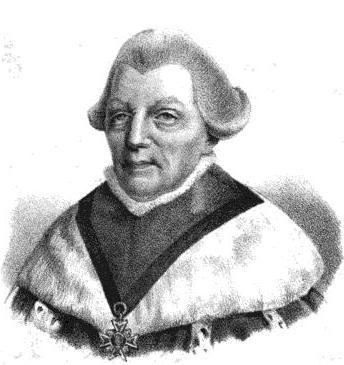
- Born: 28 March 1742; Tréveray, Meuse, France
- Died: 23 April 1829 (aged 87); Paris, France
- Occupations: Jurist, politician
- Known for: Minister of Justice

Pierre Paul Nicolas Henrion, baron de Pansey (28 March 1742 – 23 April 1829) was a French jurist and politician. He was briefly Minister of Justice in the French provisional government of 1814 formed after the defeat of Napoleon. He was one of the presidents of the Court of Cassation, a final court of appeal in France. He wrote several major works on jurisprudence.

== Early years ==
Pierre Paul Nicolas Henrion de Pansey was born on 28 March 1742 in Tréveray, Meuse, near to Ligny in Lorraine. He came from a respectable family. (Note: Another source gives his birthplace as Pansey, near Chaumont, Haute-Marne, and about 15 kilometres (9.3 mi) as the crow flies from Tréveray.) He studied law at Pont-à-Mousson, then moved to Paris in 1762. He was received as an advocate on 10 March 1763, and admitted to the bar in 1767. He continued his studies, becoming expert on feudal laws and jurisprudence. His Traité des fiefs, published in 1773, made his reputation as an expert on jurisprudence.

== Revolution and Empire ==
To avoid the excesses of the French Revolution (1789–1799) Henrion returned to Pansey, where his family held property. He then moved to Joinville, a small neighboring town in the department of Haute-Marne. In 1796 the French Directory named Henrion president of the administration of Haute-Marne, based in Chaumont. Later he was named professor of legislation in the central school of Chaumont.

Under the Consulate, the Senate named Henrion to the Court of Cassation in 1800. In the year XIII (1805) he published De la Compétence des Juges de Paix, discussing the new institution of "Justice of Peace" created by the Constituent Assembly in imitation of the English equivalent. With this work he tried to clarify the role of the justices based on the spirit of the rather obscure applicable laws. In 1809 Henrion was appointed president of the chambre des requêtes of the Court of Cassation. In 1810 he issued De l'Autorité Judiciaire, a broad work on judicial authority that covered history, functions, issues, relationship to other powers and so on.

Napoleon made Henrion a Counselor of State and gave him the title of Baron. Henrion objected that he did not want to leave the Court of Cassation, but Napoleon assured him that he could stay, and he would only be asked to give verbal advice to the emperor.

== Bourbon Restoration ==
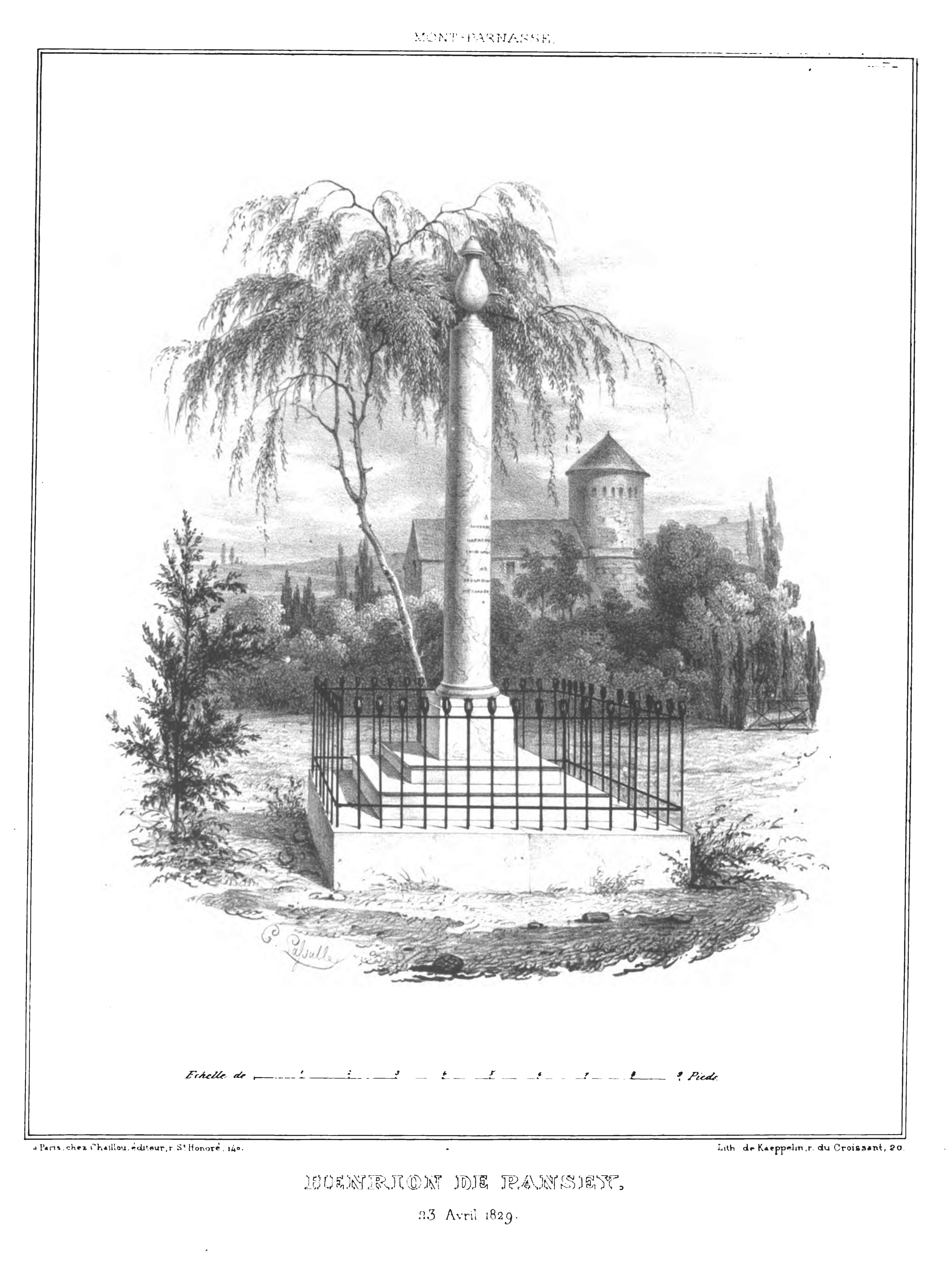
Funerary Monument of Henrion de Pansey at Montparnasse Cemetery in 1839

After the fall of the Empire, the provisional government announced the appointment of commissaires to head the ministries on 3 April 1814. Henrion was given the ministry of Justice. As minister he released citizens who had been arbitrarily detained in prison, and suppressed the provostal courts and customs tribunes. He held office until 13 May 1814, when King Louis XVIII announced the government of the first Bourbon restoration. Louis XVIII named Henrion to his council.

Henrion strongly supported the Charter of 1814, which he thought combined the best features of monarchy, aristocracy and democracy. During the Hundred Days (20 March to 8 July 1815) when Napoleon returned from exile, Henrion remained at the Court of Cassation. As a result, on the second Bourbon Restoration he was dismissed from his position as Councillor of State in extraordinary service.

In 1822 Henrion published du pouvoir municipal et des Biens communaux, exploring the nature of public and private authority. In the years that followed he continued to publish significant works on jurisprudence while presiding over the Court of Cassation. He died in Paris on 23 April 1829, and was buried in the Montparnasse Cemetery.

== Works ==
Henrion's works include:

- Traité des fiefs de Dumoulin, analysé et conféré avec les autres feudistes. 717 p. 1773
- De la compétence des juges de paix 2e edition, XVI-576 p., 1812 Paris T. Barrois père
- De l'autorité judiciaire dans les gouvernements monarchiques 351 p., 1810 Paris T. Barrois père
- De l'autorité judiciaire en France VIII-587 p., 1818 Paris T. Barrois père
- Des Assemblées nationales en France, depuis l'établissement de la monarchie jusqu'en 1614, par M. le président Henrion de Pansey IV-383 p., 1826 Paris T. Barrois père
- Des biens communaux et de la police rurale et forestière 3e, 1 vol. (XVI-32-517 p.), 1833 Paris T. Barrois père et B. Duprat
- Des pairs de France et de l'ancienne constitution françoise 179 p., 1816 Paris T. Barrois père
- Dissertations féodales, par M. Henrion de Pansey... 2 vol. in-4°, 1789 Paris T. Barrois
- Du pouvoir municipal et de la police intérieure des communes 4e edition, précédée d'une introduction et mise au courant de la législation et de la jurisprudence, 1 vol. (LVI-487 p.), 1840 Paris B. Duprat
- Du Pouvoir municipal, de sa nature, de ses attributions et de ses rapports avec l'autorité judiciaire 103 p., 1820 Paris T. Barrois père
- Du Régime des bois communaux selon le nouveau Code forestier, pour servir de supplément au Traité des biens communaux 68 p., 1827 Paris T. Barrois père
- Oeuvres judiciaires du président Henrion de Pansey, annotées par une société de jurisconsultes... Avec une notice biographique par M. Rozet XXXII-768 p., 1843 Paris B. Dussillon
- Un mot sur le contentieux du Conseil d'État, entretien de M. le premier président Henrion de Pansey... publié par M. Cotelle 67 p. 1830 Paris T. Barrois père et B. Duprat
