= David Paul Drach =

French librarian

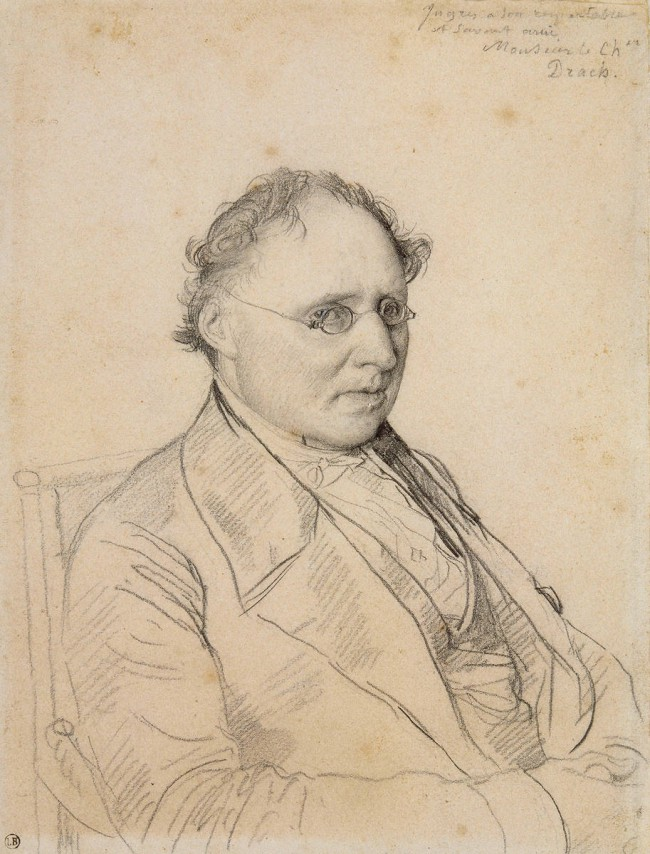
- Portrait of David Paul Drach by Jean-Auguste-Dominique Ingres
- Born: 6 March 1791; Strasbourg, France
- Died: January 1868 (aged 76); Rome, Papal States (now Italy)
- Occupation: Librarian

David Paul Drach (6 March 1791 in Strasbourg – January 1868 in Rome) was a Catholic convert from Judaism, and librarian of the College of Propaganda in Rome.

== Life ==
Drach received his first instruction at the hands of his father, a noted Hebraist and Talmudic scholar and rabbi. At the age of twelve, Drach entered the first division of the Talmudic school in Edendorf near Strasbourg. This course of study, lasting ordinarily for three years, he completed in one year, and entered the second division of the Talmudic school in Bischheim the following year. He graduated in eighteen months and then matriculated in Westhofen to qualify as a teacher of the Talmud. When only sixteen years of age he accepted the position of instructor in Rappoltsweiler, remaining there three years; afterwards he followed the same profession in Colmar.

Here the youth devoted himself to the study of secular sciences to which he had already seriously applied himself during his Talmudic studies. Having obtained the rather unwilling permission of his father, in 1812 he went to Paris, where he received a call to a prominent position in the Central Jewish Consistory and at the same time fulfilled the duties of tutor for the children of Baruch Weil. The results of his method of teaching induced the Catholic families of Louis Mertien and Bernard Mertien to entrust their children to his care. This may have had some influence on his subsequent conversion. He writes: "Stirred by the edifying examples of Catholic piety continually set before me to the furtherance of my own salvation, the tendency towards Christianity, born in earlier life, acquired such strength that I resisted no longer."

Drach had already begun the study of Greek and Latin so as to become acquainted with the Christian doctrines in their original sources. He now applied himself studiously to patristic theology and specialized in the study of the Septuagint in order to investigate reports the Alexandrian translators had been unfaithful to the original Hebrew. These studies resulted in his unquestioned belief in the divinity and Messiahship of Jesus Christ. On Maundy Thursday, 1823, he renounced Judaism in the presence of Archbishop Quélen, at Notre-Dame de Paris, was baptized the following (Holy) Saturday, and on Easter morning received his first Holy Communion and the Sacrament of Confirmation. Two daughters and an infant son were also baptized. His two daughters entered the order of Notre Dame de Charité du Bon Pasteur d'Angers and his son became an ecclesiastic, and a distinguished Biblical scholar. In 1817, Drach married Sara Deutz, the daughter of Judith Bermann and Rabbi Emanuel Deutz, Chief Rabbi of Paris. According to Nikolaus Scheidm writing in the Catholic Encyclopedia, Sara Drach, the only member of the family who remained Jewish, is reported to have abducted the children. They were returned, however, after two years from London to France.

After a few years Drach went to Rome, where he was appointed librarian of the Propaganda (1827), which office he held at his death. His conversion apparently inspired others, including the Libermann brothers; Francis Libermann was especially grateful to Drach for his advice and assistance in the establishment of the "Congregation of the Immaculate Heart of Mary" (1842), which soon merged with the older "Holy Ghost Fathers" (1848).

== Published works ==
- Lettres d'un rabbin converti aux Israélites, ses frères (Paris, 1825)
- Bible de Vence, with annotations (Paris, 1827–1833) in 27 volumes octavo.
- He remodelled the Hebrew-Latin Dictionary of Gesenius
- Catholic Hebrew-Chaldaic dictionary of the Old Testament (ed. Migne, Paris, 1848)
- Du divorce dans la synagogue (Rome, 1840);
- Harmonie entre l'église et la synagogue (Paris, 1844). There is a Spanish translation
- La Cabale des Hébreux (Rome, 1864).
