= Infamous Decree =

Decree issued by Napoleon

On March 17, 1808, French Emperor Napoleon I made three decrees in an attempt to promote the equality of Jews and integrate them into French society, building on the Jewish Emancipation of 1790–1791. The Infamous Decree, the third of the three decrees, had some adverse effects. Although its aim was to grant equal citizenship, it restricted Jewish money lending (Catholics were not permitted to commit acts of usury, that is, the charging of interest as profit on loans), annulled all debts owed to Jews by married women, minors, and soldiers, voided any loan that had interest rates exceeding 10 percent, and limited the residency of new Jewish peoples in France by restricting their business activities, while allowing work in agriculture and craftsmanship. The combination of these decrees severely weakened the financial position of once dominant rural French money lending Jews.

The decree applied only to Jews in eastern France; those "established in Bordeaux and in the departments of the Gironde and the Landes, having given rise to no complaints and not involved in illicit traffic", were not affected, nor were those living in Paris.

== Background ==
Napoleon initially won the allegiance of Jews when, in 1797, he emancipated Jews in Ancona, Italy. He officially chose two High Priests of the Jewish Nation and seven councillors to the High Priests. He allegedly encouraged Jews to reclaim Jerusalem in 1799 with the help of his army in a letter to a rabbi in Jerusalem, but the letter is suspected by many to be a forgery. He in no way acted against the Jews until the early 19th century, when he passed a series of three decrees, one of which became known as the Infamous Decree. Some, such as author Franz Kobler, attribute the change in attitude to his new attachment to France and to his newfound desire to protect the interests of the French people. When he was the hero of the Jews, he still was an "ardent patriot" of his home island of Corsica.

In France, quite early in the 19th century, Jewish moneylenders were accused of usury in Alsace as well as of abusing other rights, which were given to them in their emancipation in 1791 under King Louis XVI. Napoleon sided with popular French opinion. Though Napoleon desired equality for the Jews, he called them "the most despicable of men" and proclaimed he did not want their number to increase in an 1808 letter to his brother Jérôme.

Napoleon issued an imperial decree in 1806 that suspended payment of debts owed to Jewish moneylenders for one year to warn against usury to the supposedly-degenerate Jewish population, and he called a conference with Jewish leaders, the Grand Sanhedrin.

Though the first meeting of the Grand Sanhedrin, on February 4, 1807, was ceremonial and solemn, the group was largely ineffective since nothing was done during the month they met to ameliorate the conditions on the Jews that would be imposed by the coming decrees. During the eight sessions, the Grand Sanhedrin was forced to condone intermarriage between Frenchmen and Jews so that the Jewish people might be absorbed into France, since Jews were considered substandard citizens and needed to be either absorbed or expelled. The group also had to support other actions to assimilate the Jews by removing their Jewish ties, such as approving military service to attach young Jewish men to France, rather than their religion and ethnic background. Such measures were a prelude to the passing of the three decrees on March 17, 1808.

== History ==
After Napoleon’s emancipation of the Jews he "wanted to mandate what some proponents of emancipation had hoped would happen, namely the total assimilation, or biological fusion of Jews with the rest of the French people." To mandate the assimilation of Jews into French society, three decrees were issued on March 17, 1808.

The "first two decrees restored order to the informal Jewish communities that had survived the revolution by establishing a hierarchical, centralised organisation, under the aegis of the ministry of religions." The first two decrees set up the consistories that were designed to enforce the decrees. Some of their members were also part of the Grand Sanhedrin, which met in 1807. The consistories consisted of a grand rabbi, possibly another rabbi, and three lay members who were residents of the town. The consistories acted to enforce Sanhedrin rules through the use of education; they also worked as informants to the government to monitor Jewish activity. There was one consistory for every town that contained 2,000 or more Jews.

The Infamous Decree, also known as the "third decree," presumed all Jews guilty of chicanery (the use of trickery to achieve a political, financial, or legal purpose) unless they were proven innocent, and it restricted Jewish commerce and money lending for ten years. The decree was put into place to end Jewish money lending. It annulled all debts owed to Jews by married women, minors, and soldiers and voided any loan that had interest rates exceeding 10 percent. It was an attempt by Napoleon to get rid of alleged usury by Jewish businessmen and to turn former businessmen into craftsman and farmers to promote the supposed equality between the Jews and non-Jews in France. To encourage Jews to move into that niche, they were restricted in changing residency to certain parts of France unless they "acquired rural property and devoted themselves to agriculture without entering into any commercial or business transactions." To watch the businesses that had survived the new restrictions, the decree mandated all business to acquire a patent or license, which had to be renewed yearly. The decree hurt the Jews economically but also changed their military rights.

The final restriction of the Jews was an attempt to strengthen their bond with the government and the country. The decree made it so that the Jewish conscripts could no longer find replacements for themselves when they were drafted although other Frenchmen were allowed to do.

As a consequence of the first three decrees, a final decree was implemented on July 20, 1808. It declared that all Jews were to acquire a fixed family name to help the government and consistories supervise the Jews movements. They were restricted in their choice of names and could not be allowed to pick names from the Hebrew Bible or any town names.

The three decrees were set up to expire after ten years unless they were renewed. In 1818, King Louis XVIII opted to not renew the decree, which thus expired. He was thereafter known as the "liberator of Jews."

== Aftermath ==
After the decrees were not renewed after 10 years, Jews migrated into three main areas: Paris, Alsace, and Lorraine. Indications of cultural and economical change can be seen in those areas. Although the changes were devastating to the economy of the Jews, they greatly increased the population and the distribution of the Jews. Jews migrated to the cities and to communes where there had not previously been a Jewish population. By 1809 there were more than 2,900 Jews in Paris, while the Jewish population of Alsace grew to more than 46,000.

Many Jews continued to live as lower-class citizens. They were peddlers, clothes dealers, cattle merchants, and small-scale commercial agents. However, as time went by, more and more Jews began to go into artistry. In Bordeaux, for example, 34 Jews worked as artisans and professionals. 66 Jews owned houses in the city and 39 were proprietors of rural land. The proportion of artisans in Paris and Nancy increased also. These different economical changes were accompanied by the union of Jewish youth in the public school system.

There were many concerns with Jewish youth and the public school system. There was discrimination and talk of conversions. Only 10 percent of Jewish children attended public school in Alsace. One government Jewish official said, "Our schools are Catholic schools rather than public schools. Prayers according to the Roman religion are recited upon entering and leaving, the catechism of the same religion is taught there and the textbook used are of that same religion."

By 1810, a few Jews went to local schools and moved to Lycée, but many Jewish parents neglected their children's education to prepare them into business. Jews gradually moved into public schools, and some even hired private tutors. Some parents home schooled their daughters to teach them music, dance, and embroidery.
