= Grand Sanhedrin =

Jewish high court convened by Napoleon

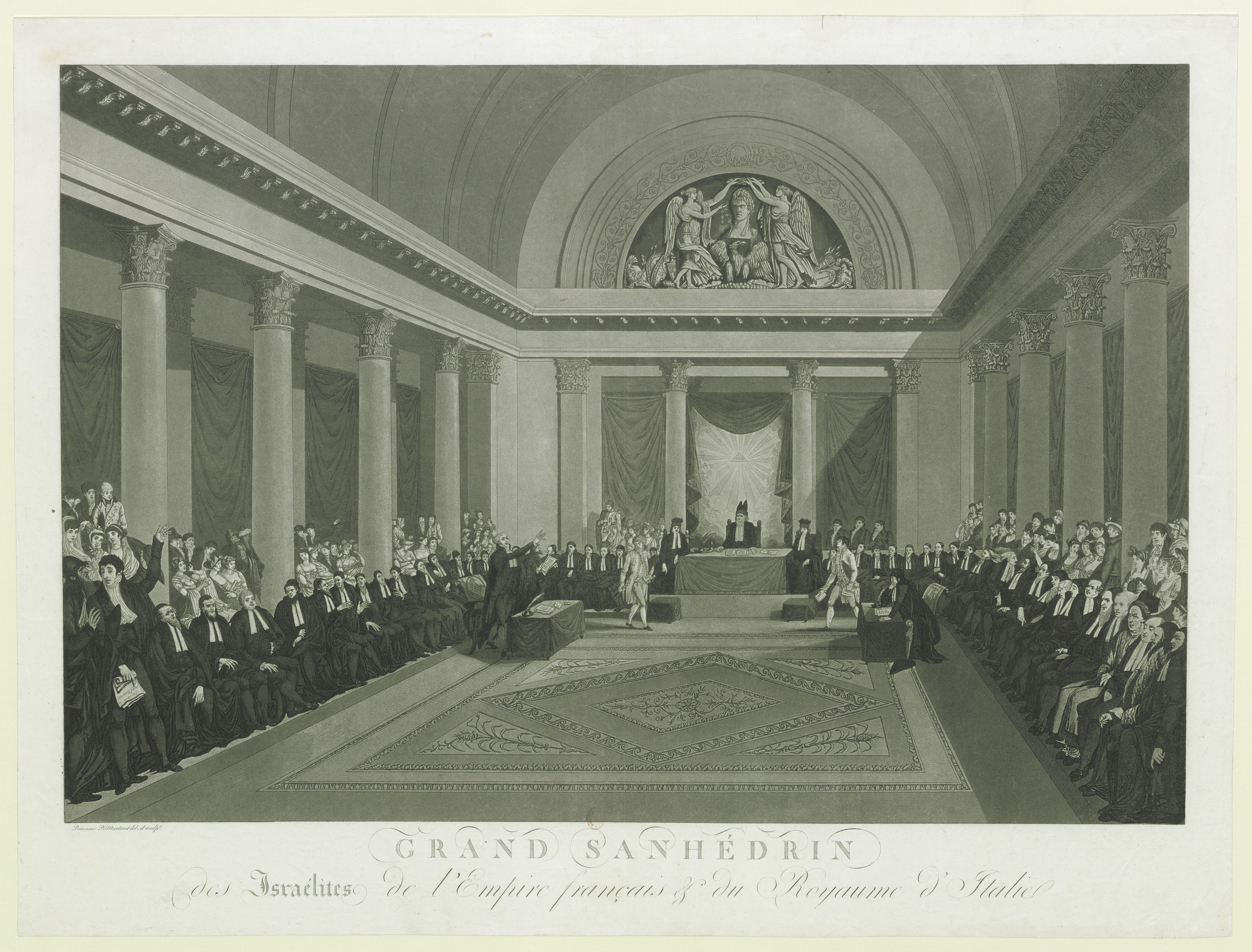
Contemporary illustration of the Grand Sanhedrin by Michel François Damane Demartrais

The Grand Sanhedrin was a Jewish high court convened in Europe by French Emperor Napoleon I to give legal sanction to the principles expressed by an assembly of Jewish notables in answer to the twelve questions submitted to it by the government. The name was chosen to imply that the Grand Sanhedrin had the authority of the original Sanhedrin that had been the main legislative and judicial body of the Jewish people in classical antiquity and late antiquity.

== Assembly of Notables ==
An assembly of Jewish notables (sometimes Assembly of Notables or Council of Notables) was summoned in April 1806 by the emperor to consider a set of 12 questions. The assembly was created in response to Napoleon's concerns about usury. Napoleon convened the assembly to endorse and legitimise his goals of assimilating the Jews into French society. Napoleon instructed the prefects to select prominent rabbis and lay people, including representatives from the old provinces of France, the Left Bank of the Rhine, and Italian Jews. The assembly was led by Rabbi Joseph David Sinzheim of Strasbourg, who later became the chairman (Nasi) of the Grand Sanhedrin.

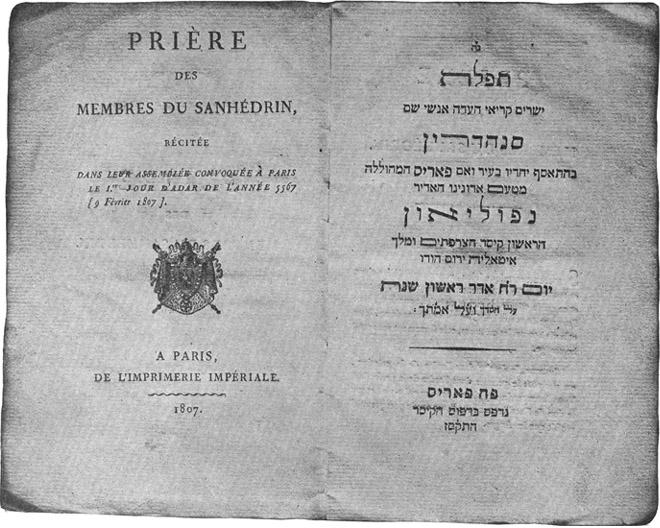
Cover page to a siddur used at the Grand Sanhedrin of Napoleon, 1807

The twelve questions presented were:

1. Is polygamy allowed among the Jews?
2. Is divorce recognised by the Jewish law?
3. "Can Jews intermarry with Christians?" or "Can a Jewess marry a Christian, and Jew a Christian woman? Or does the law allow for Jews to marry only among themselves?"
4. Will the French people be esteemed by the Jews as strangers or as brethren?
5. In what relation, according to the Jewish law, would the Jews stand towards the French?
6. Do Jews born in France consider it their native country? Are they bound to obey the laws and customs of the land?
7. Who elects the rabbis?
8. What are the legal powers of the rabbis?
9. Is the election and authority of the rabbis founded on law or custom?
10. Is there any kind of business in which Jews may not be engaged?
11. Is usury to their brethren forbidden by the law?
12. Is it permitted or forbidden to practice usury with strangers?

== Creation ==
At one of the meetings of the Notables, Commissioner Count Louis-Mathieu Molé expressed the satisfaction of the emperor with their answers, and announced that the emperor, requiring a pledge of strict adherence to these principles, had resolved to call together a "great sanhedrin" which should convert the answers into decisions and make them the basis of the future status of the Jews, create a new organisation, and condemn all false interpretations of their religious laws. In order that this sanhedrin, reviving the old Sanhedrin of Jerusalem, might be vested with the same sacred character as that time-honored institution, it was to be constituted on a similar pattern: it was to be composed of seventy-one members—two-thirds of them rabbis and one-third laymen. The Assembly of Notables, which was to continue its sessions, was to elect the members of the sanhedrin, and notify the several communities of Europe of its meeting, "that they may send deputies worthy of communicating with you and able to give to the government additional information." The Assembly of Notables was to appoint also a committee of nine, whose duty it would be to prepare the work of the sanhedrin and devise a plan for the future organisation of the Jews in France and Italy (see Consistoire).

On October 6, 1806, the Assembly of Notables issued a proclamation to all the Jewish communities of Europe, inviting them to send delegates to the sanhedrin, to convene on October 20. This proclamation, written in Hebrew, French, German, and Italian, speaks in extravagant terms of the importance of this revived institution and of the greatness of its imperial protector. While the action of Napoleon aroused in many German Jews the hope that, influenced by it, their governments also would grant them the rights of citizenship, others looked upon it as a political contrivance. When in the war against Prussia (1806-7) the emperor invaded Poland and the Jews rendered great services to his army, he remarked, laughing, "The sanhedrin is at least useful to me." David Friedländer and his friends in Berlin described it as a spectacle that Napoleon offered to the Parisians."

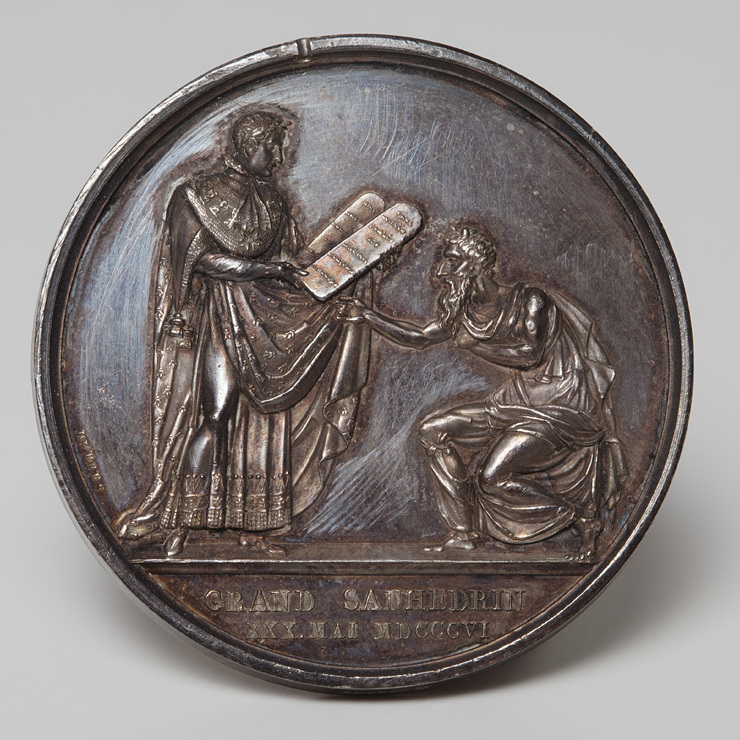
Medallion struck by the Paris mint in commemoration of the Grand Sanhedrin

The opening of the sanhedrin was delayed until Feb. 9, 1807, four days after the adjournment of the Assembly of Notables. Its seventy-one members included the rabbis sitting in the assembly, to whom were added twenty-nine other rabbis and twenty-five laymen. Its presiding officers, appointed by the minister of the interior, were: Joseph David Sinzheim, rabbi of Strasbourg (president); Joshua Benzion Segre, rabbi, and member of the municipal council of Vercelli (first vice-president); Abraham de Cologna, rabbi of Mantua (second vice-president). After a solemn religious service in the synagogue, the members assembled in the Hôtel de Ville, in a hall specially prepared for them. Following the ancient custom, they took their seats in a semicircle, according to age, on both sides of the presiding officers, the laymen behind the rabbis. They were attired in black garments, with silk capes and three-cornered hats. The sittings were public, and many visitors were present. The first meeting was opened with a Hebrew prayer written by Sinzheim; after the address of the president and of Abraham Furtado, chairman of the Assembly of Notables, it was adjourned. At the second sitting on February 12, 1807, deputies Asser, Lemon, and Litwack, of the newly constituted Amsterdam Reform congregation Adat Jeshurun, addressed the sanhedrin, Litwack in Hebrew, the others in French, expressing their entire approval of the assembly and promising their support. But the deputies were greatly disappointed when the president, after having answered them in Hebrew, invited them to be silent listeners instead of taking part in the debates as the proclamation of the Notables had caused them to expect. Addresses from congregations in France, Italy, and the Rhenish Confederation, especially from Neuwied and Dresden, were also presented.

== Sessions ==
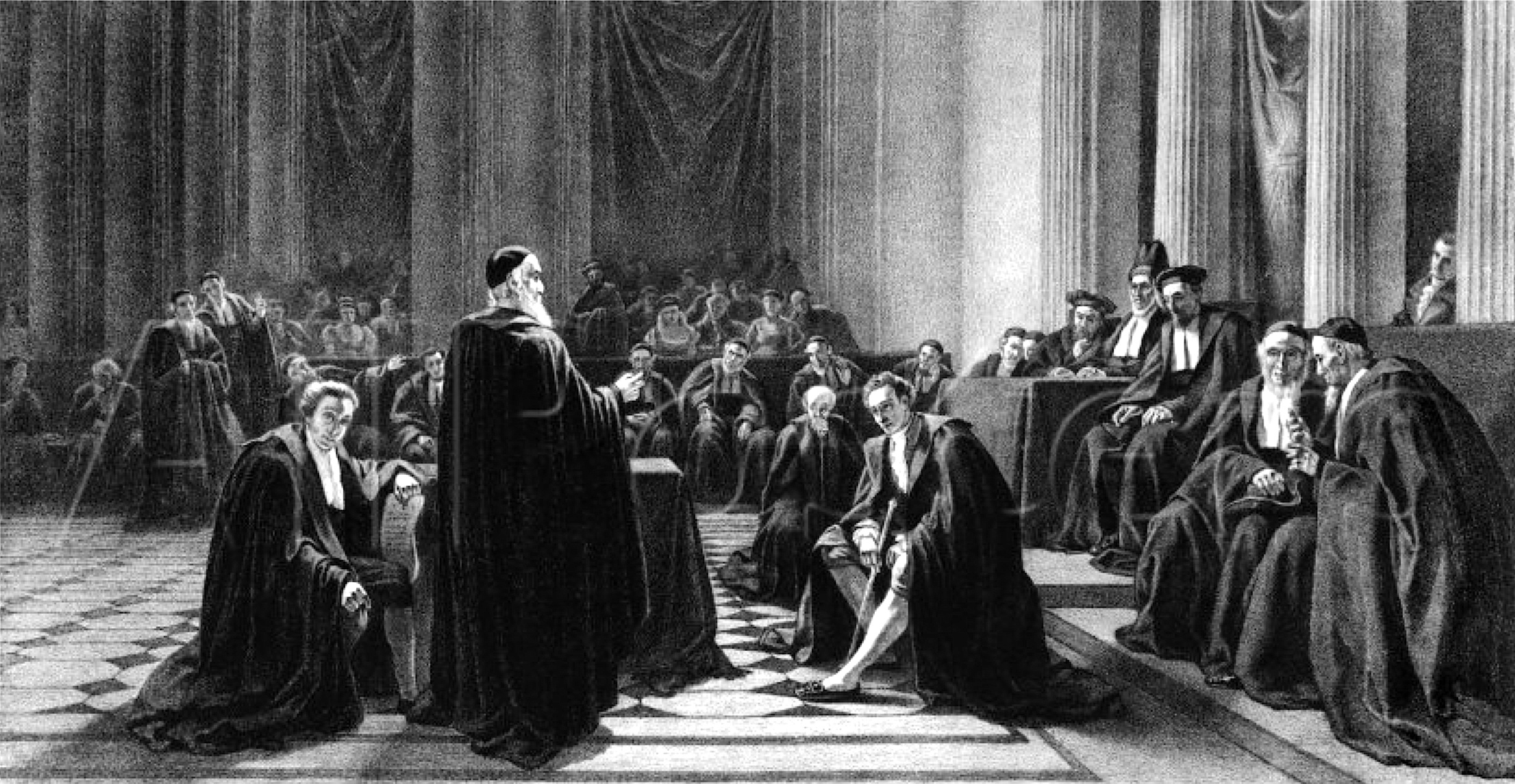
Le grand Sanhedrin (1868) by Edouard Moyse

In the sittings of February 16, 19, 23, 26, and March 2, the sanhedrin voted without discussion on the replies of the Assembly of Notables, and passed them as laws. At the eighth meeting, on March 9, Hildesheimer, deputy from Frankfurt-am-Main, and Asser of Amsterdam delivered addresses, to which the president responded in Hebrew expressing great hopes for the future. After having received the thanks of the members, he closed the sanhedrin. The Notables convened again on March 25, prepared an official report, and presented it on April 6, 1807; then the imperial commissioners declared the dissolution of the Assembly of Notables.

The decisions of the sanhedrin, formulated in nine articles and drawn up in French and Hebrew, were as follows:

1. That, in conformity with the decree of R. Gershom ben Judah, polygamy is forbidden to the Israelites;
2. That divorce by the Jewish law is valid only after previous decision of the civil authorities;
3. That the religious act of marriage must be preceded by a civil contract;
4. That marriages contracted between Israelites and Christians are binding, although they cannot be recognized as such by Mosaic law;
5. That every Israelite is religiously bound to consider his non-Jewish fellow citizens as brothers, and to aid, protect, and love them as though they were coreligionists;
6. That the Israelite is required to consider the land of his birth or adoption as his fatherland, and shall love and defend it when called upon;
7. That Judaism does not forbid any kind of handicraft or occupation;
8. That it is commendable for Israelites to engage in agriculture, manual labour, and the arts, as their ancestors in Israel were wont to do;
9. That, finally, Israelites are forbidden to exact usury from Jew or Christian.

In the introduction to these resolutions, the Grand Sanhedrin declared that, by virtue of the right conferred upon it by ancient custom and law, it constituted, like the ancient Sanhedrin, a legal assembly vested with the power of passing ordinances in order to promote the welfare of Israel and inculcate obedience to the laws of the state. These resolutions formed the basis of all subsequent laws and regulations of the French government in regard to the religious affairs of the Jews, although Napoleon, in accordance with the ninth declaration, issued a decree on March 17, 1808, restricting the Jews' legal right to lend money at an interest. The plan of organisation prepared by the committee of nine, having for its object the creation of consistories, was not submitted to the Sanhedrin, but was promulgated by Napoleon's decree of March 17, 1808.

== See also ==
- Assembly of Notables, a pre-French Revolution institution
- Infamous Decree
- Napoleon and the Jews
- Rabbinical Conference of Brunswick
