= Tréveray =

- Commune
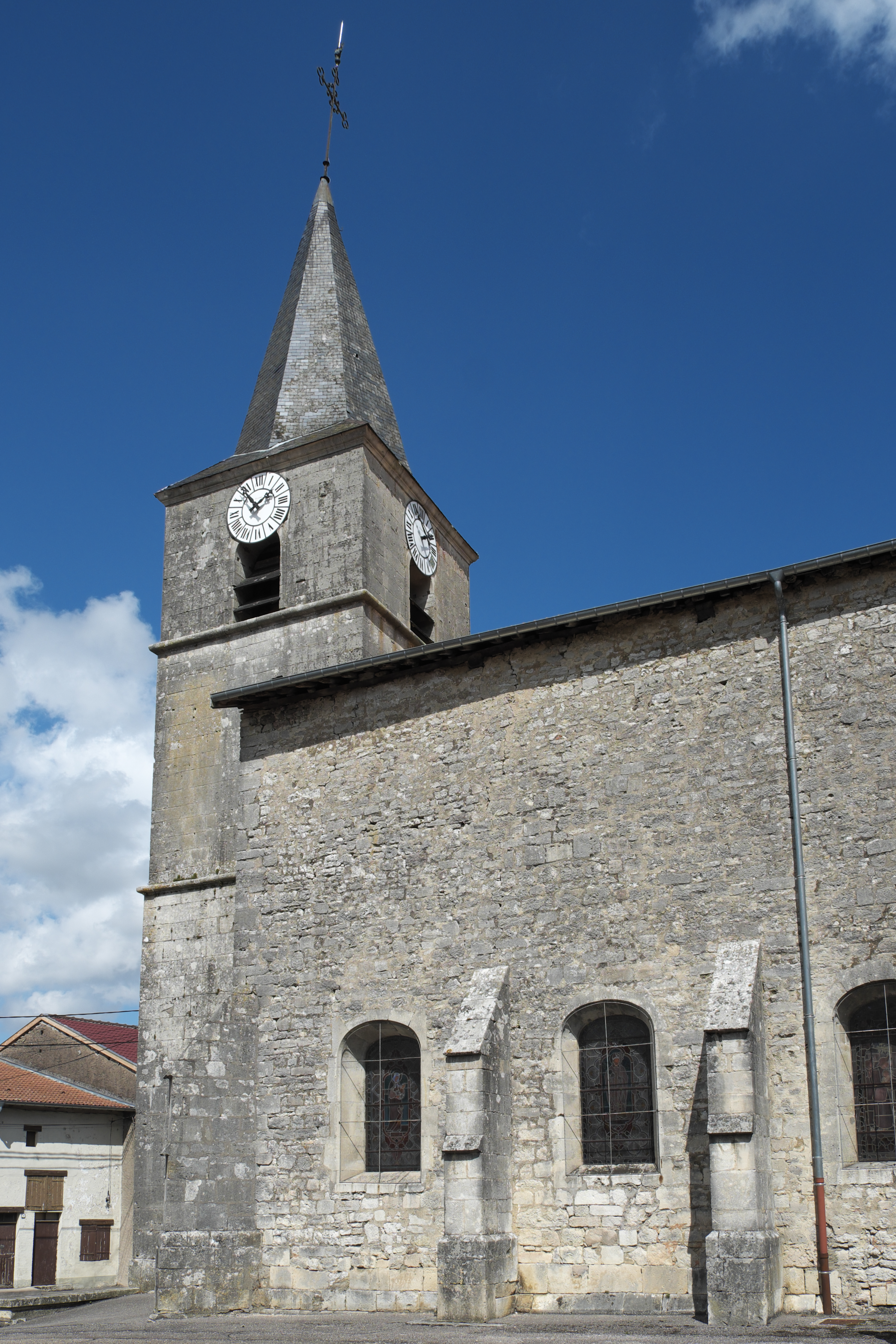
- The church in Tréveray

- Coat of arms
- Location of Tréveray
- Location within France Location within Grand Est
- Coordinates: 48°36′39″N 5°23′55″E
- Country: France
- Region: Grand Est
- Department: Meuse
- Arrondissement: Commercy
- Canton: Ligny-en-Barrois

Government
  - Mayor (2020–2026): Pascal Lallemant
- Area^{1}: 17.18 km^{2} (6.63 sq mi)
- Elevation: 325 m (1,066 ft)
- Highest elevation: 385 m (1,263 ft)
- Lowest elevation: 248 m (814 ft)
- Population (2023): 548
  - Density: 31.9/km^{2} (82.6/sq mi)
- Time zone: UTC+01:00 (CET)
  - Summer (DST): UTC+02:00 (CEST)
- INSEE/Postal code: 55516 /55130
- ^{1} French Land Register data, which excludes lakes, ponds, glaciers > 1 km^{2} (0.386 sq mi or 247 acres) and river estuaries.

Tréveray (French pronunciation: [tʁev(ə)ʁɛ]) is a commune in the Meuse department in Grand Est in north-eastern France.

== See also ==
- Communes of the Meuse department
