= Pansey =

- Commune
- Location of Pansey
- Location within France Location within Grand Est
- Coordinates: 48°28′19″N 5°17′18″E
- Country: France
- Region: Grand Est
- Department: Haute-Marne
- Arrondissement: Saint-Dizier
- Canton: Poissons
- Intercommunality: Bassin de Joinville en Champagne

Government
  - Mayor (2020–2026): Philippe Delbé
- Area^{1}: 8.96 km^{2} (3.46 sq mi)
- Highest elevation: 390 m (1,280 ft)
- Lowest elevation: 292 m (958 ft)
- Population (2023): 86
  - Density: 9.6/km^{2} (25/sq mi)
- Time zone: UTC+01:00 (CET)
  - Summer (DST): UTC+02:00 (CEST)
- INSEE/Postal code: 52376 /52230
- ^{1} French Land Register data, which excludes lakes, ponds, glaciers > 1 km^{2} (0.386 sq mi or 247 acres) and river estuaries.

Pansey (French pronunciation: [pɑ̃sɛ]; before January 2011 Pancey) is a commune in the Haute-Marne department in north-eastern France.

== See also ==
- Communes of the Haute-Marne department
