= Emmanuel Deutz =

French rabbi

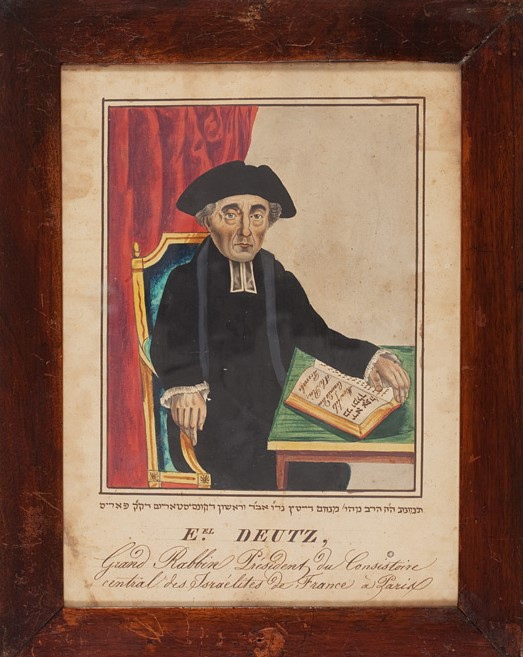
- 19th century portrait of Emmanuel Deutz
- Born: 1763; Bonn, Germany
- Died: 1842 (aged 78–79)
- Occupation: Rabbi
- Children: 5, including Simon Deutz
- Relatives: David Paul Drach (son-in-law)

Emmanuel Deutz (1763-1842) was a German-born French rabbi.

== Biography ==
Emmanuel Deutz was born in 1763 in Bonn, Germany.

Deutz served as a rabbi in Koblenz, Germany. He served as the Chief Rabbi of France from 1810 to 1842. Nevertheless, Deutz was not a fluent French speaker.

Deutz had a wife, Judith, and five children. His daughter Sarah married David Paul Drach. When Drach converted to Roman Catholicism, the couple separated. Meanwhile, one of Deutz's sons, Simon Deutz, also converted to Roman Catholicism.

Deutz died in 1842.
