= Simon Deutz =

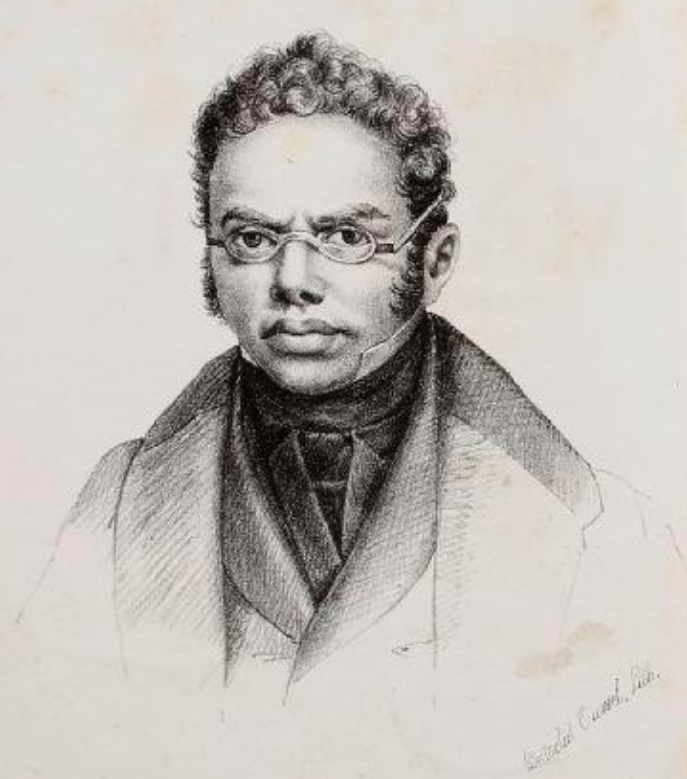
- Born: 1802; Koblenz, Rhin-et-Moselle, French Republic
- Died: 1844 (aged 41–42)
- Occupation: Courtier
- Parent: Emmanuel Deutz

Simon Deutz (1802-1844) was a German-born French courtier.

== Early life ==
Simon Deutz was born in 1802 in Koblenz, Germany. He emigrated to Paris with his family in 1806. His father, Emmanuel Deutz, served as the Chief Rabbi of France, from 1810 to 1842.

== Career ==
Deutz was an advisor to Marie-Caroline de Bourbon-Sicile, duchesse de Berry. When, in 1832, she tried to regain her son's claim to the throne, after the July Revolution, Deutz denounced her to King Louis Philippe I.

== Personal life ==
Deutz converted from Judaism to Roman Catholicism in 1828, and he received the Christian name Charles Gonzaga. However, as early as 1832, he made requests to the Consistory of France to be able to convert back to Judaism. Initially denied, he eventually converted back to Judaism after Adolphe Crémieux interceded in his favour. Meanwhile, he married in London, then moved to the United States, and finally moved back to France.

== Death and legacy ==
Deutz died in 1844. Professor Catherine Nicault of the University of Reims Champagne-Ardenne has argued that Deutz's betrayal of Duchess Berry, along with the support of many other French Jews for mainstream Republicanism in France, contributed enormously to the rise of antisemitism among Royalists, the French nobility, and the traditional political right during the 19th century.
