= Abraham Furtado =

French Jewish leader (1756-1817)

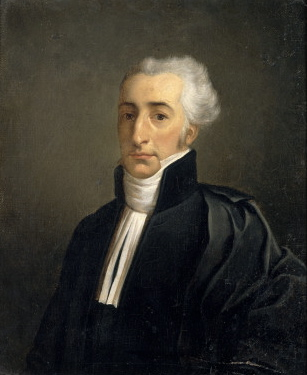
Abraham Furtado

Abraham Furtado (1756-1817) was born to a French Jewish family of Portuguese Marrano descent. He was born in London after his family emigrated there after the 1755 Lisbon earthquake. Soon after, they moved to a small town in southwestern France, Saint-Esprit (today, a district of Bayonne). After a short time, the family moved to Bordeaux, where Furtado was raised and educated. Throughout school he studied history, philosophy, and politics which spearheaded his involvement with politics as a young adult. Furtado was an active Jewish Girondist, a member of the Bordeaux Jewish Delegation, and a member of the Bordeaux Popular Commission. He was elected president of the Assembly of Notables and later served as secretary of Napoleon Bonaparte’s Grand Sanhedrin; a Jewish high court convened in Paris.

During the Reign of Terror (1793-1794), he went into hiding and kept detailed accounts of daily life in his journal. He hid in houses of friends in and around Bordeaux as the Terror swept through the city. In his journal, he recalls using a knife to cut an eyehole in his wall and watched the revolution unfold in the streets. He noted that amid the Terror, the general population wanted for more Jews to be killed. It was in hiding that he wrote a letter to the Terror administration pleading for his life and trying to clear his name and association with the Bordeaux Popular Commission, which the administration had made illegal. He also wrote about his return to reading while he was in hiding and describes reading Montesquieu, Rousseau, Dante, and Don Quixote, which he is fondly reminiscent of.

After the terror when he came out of hiding, he wrote about his distrust of common people and also the mistakes of the Bordeaux Popular Commission. He commented on the contemporary political state of France and dissected how the revolution was carried out. He states that essentially all of the country’s ills were blamed on Louis XIV and that it was a much wider issue between the possessors of titles and those who had money. Overall, he urged people to respect authority, act with order and justice, and fight abuses. He comments on philosophy, morals, and ethical issues too, and ultimately tries to play the role of the moralizer.

Later in life, Furtado served as a secretary on Napoleon’s Grand Sanhedrin with the intention of considering questions regarding French Jews. It is known that he travelled between Bordeaux and Paris during the time he was involved.
