= Israelite Central Consistory of France =

French organization

The Central Jewish Consistory of France (French: Consistoire central israélite de France) is an institution set up by Napoleon I by the Imperial Decree of 17 March 1808 to administer Jewish worship and congregations in France. He also directed the establishment of regional Jewish Consistories, subordinate to the Central Consistory, across France. The consistories were ranked as établissements publics du culte (public-law corporations of worship). Given Napoleon's political emancipation of the Jews, he wanted a representative body that could deal with his government.

Following the separation of religion and state in 1905, the Jewish consistories lost their public-law status. Jewish congregations of France developed Jewish liturgical associations under an umbrella organisation called the Union of Jewish Congregations of France (Union des Communautés juives de France). It retained the name of Central Consistory for its executive body. The 12 members of the Central Consistory elect the Chief Rabbi of France.

In the 21st century, France has the third-largest Jewish congregation after Israel and the United States.

== See also ==
- Consistory (Judaism)
- Napoleon and the Jews
- Union générale des israélites de France
