= Consistory (Judaism) =

A Jewish consistory (or Consistoire in French; see conventional meanings: consistory in Wiktionary) was a body governing the Jewish congregations of a province or of a country; also the district administered by the consistory.

Napoleon Bonaparte established the first central Jewish consistory in France, and ordered regional ones to be set up in turn. The political emancipation of the Jews required the creation of a representative body that could transact official business with a government in the name of the Jews. The Jews in countries under French influence during the Napoleonic period often also established consistories. In addition, in this period, the educated classes desired religious reform and supported the creation of a body vested with authority to render religious decisions.

== France ==
Napoleon I established the first Jewish consistory. In 1806 he convened the Assembly of Jewish Notables, whose resolutions were confirmed by a subsequently convened Grand Sanhedrin. By decree of March 17, 1808, he organized a consistory. According to this decree, every department containing 2,000 Jews might establish a consistory. Departments having fewer than this number might combine with others; but no department had more than one consistory. Above these provincial consistories, there was a central consistory. Every consistory consisted of a grand rabbi, with another rabbi where possible, and three lay members, two of whom were residents of the town where the consistory sat. They were elected by twenty-five "notables," who were nominated by the French authorities.

Thus Israelite French consistories were, like their Protestant namesakes, parastatal entities to represent these religious minorities to the administration, which in return used to control them. Eligible to become members of the consistory were Israelites who had reached the age of thirty years, who had never been bankrupt, nor practised usury. The central consistory consisted of three grand rabbis and two lay members. Every year one grand rabbi retired, and the remaining members elected his successor.

Napoleon demanded that the consistories should ensure that resolutions passed by the Assembly of Notables and confirmed by the Sanhedrin should be enforced by the rabbis. He required the following: proper decorum should be maintained in the synagogue; Jews should take up mechanical trades (to replace usury); and the leaders should ensure that no young men evaded military service. The central consistory watched over the consistories of the various departments, and had the right to appoint the rabbis.

== French dependencies ==
Napoleon's administration introduced the concept of the consistory to the various countries which were under the sway of France during his era and where Jews had been emancipated, such as Belgium (French-annexed from 1794 to 1814), and the client states of Holland and Westphalia. Napoleon's youngest brother, Jérôme Bonaparte, ruled over Westphalia, where he established the Royal Westphalian Consistory of the Israelites by decree of March 31, 1808. It was composed of a president (who could be either a rabbi or a layman), three rabbis, two lay members, and one secretary. Consistorial President Israel Jacobson was largely responsible for establishing this, as he hoped to use it to introduce his own ideas about Reform Judaism, including organs in the synagogue and the covering of coffins with flowers. The consistory ordered the introduction of confirmation for Jewish youths and removed the prohibition against consumption of leguminous plants on Passover.

With the exception of the consistory in Belgium, none of these organizations survived the Napoleonic era. Counter-revolutions in the countries formerly under French influence resulted in governments re-establishing discriminatory laws against the Jews.

During the middle of the nineteenth century, various Jewish communities worked to introduce either a consistory or a synod which should, by an authoritative vote, settle the difficulties which arose when the demands of the time came into conflict with the traditional Halakah law. Some members of the Jewish communities wanted reform, but others resisted change. None of these attempts was successful.

== 19th century ==
Since Napoleon's 1808 decree, the Consistory in France has changed. Members changed the method of electing the delegates, and dropped provisions assigning the rabbis secondary roles as government informers. In the later 19th century, Louis Philippe (May 25, 1844) and Napoleon III (June 15, 1850, and August 29, 1862) made significant changes.

In 1871 the ambits of the three consistories in Colmar, Metz and Strasbourg became part of Alsace-Lorraine outside the supervision of the Central Consistory. They were not under any other common umbrella. However, the three consistories remained concordatory religious bodies and were entitled to nominate together one representative for the upper house of the parliament of Alsace-Lorraine, as did other recognised religious bodies. After French defeat in the Franco-Prussian War, Alsace-Lorraine was ceded to Germany.

The French law of December 12, 1872, introduced the system of universal suffrage in elections of the consistories. In the beginning of the 20th century, there were twelve consistories: Paris, Nancy, Bordeaux, Lyon, Marseilles, Bayonne, Epinal, Lille, Besançon, Algier, Constantine, and Oran. Each has the grand rabbi of the consistorial district and six lay members, with a secretary. Each consistory has a representative in the Central Consistory, which is composed of twelve members and the Grand Rabbi of France; its seat is in Paris.

== 20th century ==
By the 1905 French law on the Separation of Religions and the State, the Israelite consistories in France lost their status as établissements publics du culte (public-law corporations of cult). With the defeat of Germany in World War I, in 1919 the three Israelite consistories in Alsace-Moselle returned to French jurisdiction. Their concordatory status has since been preserved in what is now called the local law in Alsace-Moselle. They retain their status as parastatal entities.

== See also ==
- Conseil Représentatif des Institutions juives de France (CRIF)
